= Abu Abdallah al-Baridi =

Prominent, wealthy Iraqi tax official

Abu Abdallah al-Hasan al-Baridi (Arabic: الحسن البريدي; fl. 927/8–944) was the most prominent of the Baridi family, Iraqi tax officials who used the enormous wealth gained from tax farming to vie for control of the rump Abbasid Caliphate in the 930s and 940s.

In this contest Abu Abdallah and his two brothers manoeuvred between the military commanders Ibn Ra'iq and Bajkam, the Hamdanids of Mosul, the Buyids of Fars, and the ruler of Oman; they twice occupied the Abbasid capital Baghdad, but were never able to hold it for long; and at different times ruled Khuzistan, Wasit and Basra; Abu Abdallah himself was named vizier of the Abbasid caliph four times in the process. Ultimately, the constant warfare against multiple enemies exhausted the family's resources, and by 943 Abu Abdallah resorted to assassinating his youngest brother to shore up his wealth. Abu Abdallah died in June 944, and was succeeded as governor of Basra by his son Abu'l-Qasim, who ruled the city until the Buyids conquered it in 947.

== Origin and early career ==
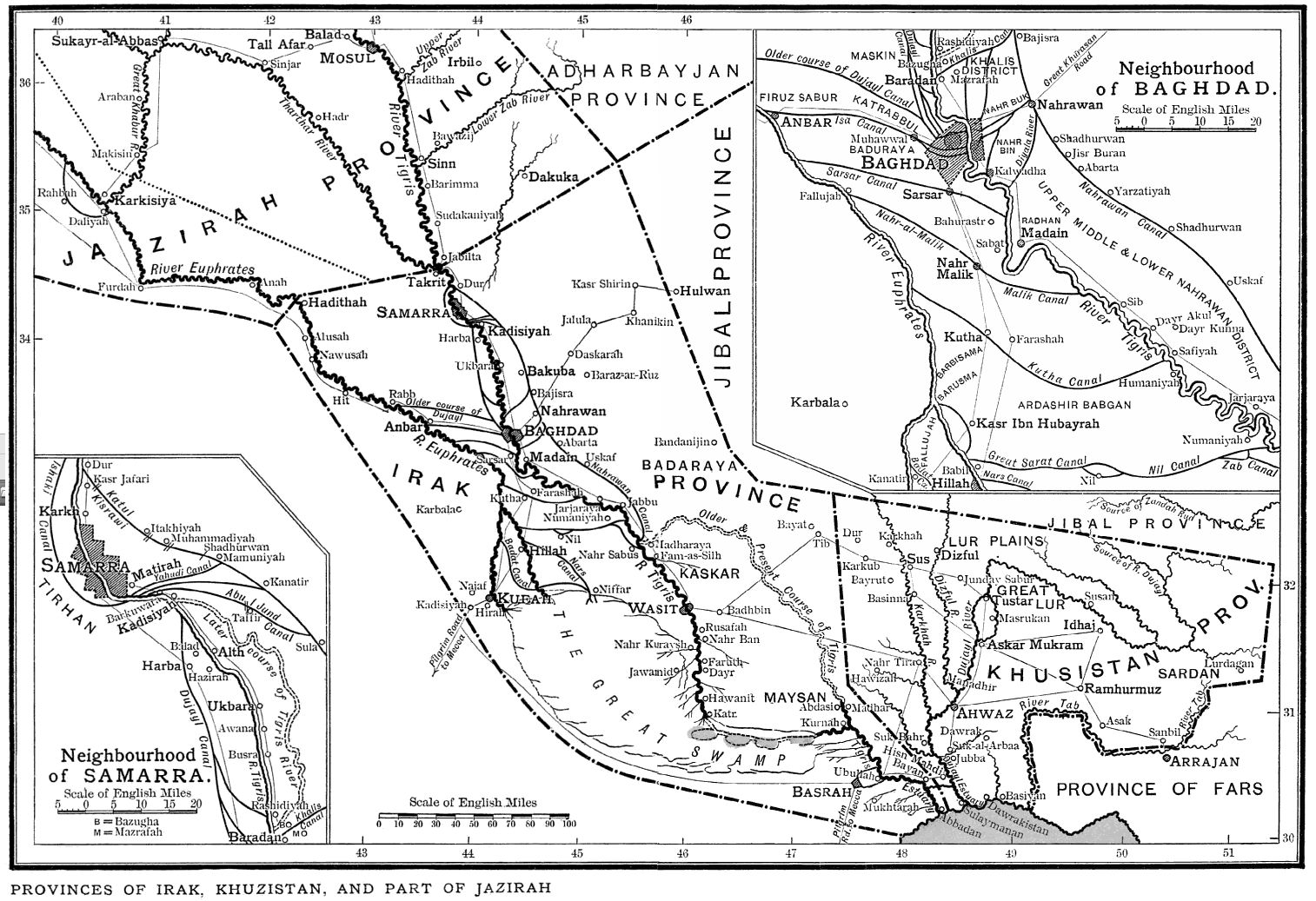
Map of Iraq in the Abbasid era

Abu Abdallah was the oldest of three brothers, members of a Shi'a family from Basra. Their father was post-master in the city, whence the family's nisba of "al-Baridi". Abu Abdallah's two younger brothers, Abu Yusuf Ya'qub and Abu'l-Husayn, also played an important role in their brother's life. He also had five sons, but only one of them, Abu'l-Qasim, is independently mentioned in the sources. Frugal and chaste in his personal life, just like his brothers Abu Abdallah had a pronounced tendency for self-advancement—it is said that his motto was "My drum has a sound that shall be heard one of these days!". His temporary political ally and son-in-law, the Turkish military commander Bajkam, is said to have remarked of him that his "turban covered the head not of a man but of a devil", while the 20th-century historian Harold Bowen remarked that he was distinguished for his "suppleness and subtlety of mind", and called him "an accomplished villain".

The family first appears in 927/8, when all three brothers had posts as tax farmers in the province of Khuzistan, whose capital was Ahwaz. They had already at that time acquired a bad reputation, and were frequently dismissed and even imprisoned as power in Baghdad changed hands. They managed to recover and prosper largely due to the patronage of the vizier Ibn Muqla. It was Abu Abdallah who, against a bribe of 20,000 dirhams to Ibn Muqla, secured the tax-farming contract for Khuzistan, and further lucrative posts for his brothers. When Ibn Muqla fell from power in 930, the brothers, now very wealthy, were arrested and had to pay a hefty fine in exchange for their liberty.

Abu Abdallah rose to wider prominence in 932, when he offered to finance the expedition sent by Caliph al-Qahir (r. 932–934) to subdue the fugitive supporters of his slain predecessor, al-Muqtadir. For this, the revenue of the entire province of Khuzistan was placed under his control, and through ruthless oppression of the local population, he managed to extract a considerable fortune. In late 933 or early 934, shortly before his downfall, Caliph al-Qahir gave him a tax farming contract for the province of Wasit, to the sum of 13 million dirhams.

With the deposition of al-Qahir and the accession of al-Radi (r. 934–940), Ibn Muqla also returned to the vizierate, and the Baridis were restored to their positions in Khuzistan. At Ahwaz, Abu Abdallah managed to become the secretary of the chamberlain Yaqut, whose army had retreated to the city after being defeated by the Buyid warlord Ali ibn Buya and driven from Fars. Soon after, another Iranian warlord, Mardavij, evicted Yaqut from Ahwaz, and Abu Abdallah followed him to Wasit. As the de facto paymaster of Yaqut's army, Abu Abdallah now hatched a plan to suborn the latter's command over his troops. Despite being warned of his intentions, Yaqut refused to believe them until it was too late; marching to confront his colleague, he was ambushed and killed by Abu Abdallah's now much larger army.

== Rivalry with Ibn Ra'iq and Bajkam ==
With this stroke, Abu Abdallah established himself as a de facto independent ruler over Khuzistan. He amassed a huge fortune by deferring the dispatch of tax revenues to Baghdad, where his brother Abu Yusuf Ya'qub looked after their interests, and established independent contacts with the Buyids of Fars.

In 936, Muhammad ibn Ra'iq sidelined the powerless caliph and became dictator of what remained of the Abbasid realm, with the title of amir al-umara. Almost immediately he tried to extend the area under his control by attacking the Baridis. Ibn Ra'iq was defeated and forced to leave Basra as well to the Baridis, but his general Bajkam reversed the situation by scoring two major victories, despite being outnumbered, that allowed him to take possession of Khuzistan.

This resulted in Abu Abdallah resuming his contacts with Ali ibn Buya, who in late 937 sent his younger brother Ahmad to assist the Baridis against Bajkam. The allies were successful, and Bajkam was forced to fall back to Wasit. The Baridis and Buyids soon quarrelled, and Bajkam recovered most of the province, while Abu Abdallah fled to Basra. In the meantime, however, Bajkam had turned against Ibn Ra'iq, and was positioning himself as an independent warlord. Ibn Ra'iq opened up contacts with Abu Abdallah, in exchange for a renewal of the tax-farming contract and the governorship of Khuzistan. Bajkam moved first, attacked and captured the Baridi, only to conclude an alliance with him. After this, Bajkam marched on Baghdad, defeated Ibn Ra'iq, and on 10/11 September 938, was himself named amir al-umara.

"O Sky, to fall, O Earth, to quake, prepare:
Ibn al-Baridi has become Vizier."

— Satirical poem by Abu al-Faraj al-Isfahani on the conferment of the vizierate to Abu Abdallah al-Baridi.

In exchange for his support, Abu Abdallah was confirmed as governor of Basra and Wasit, and was given the post of vizier, which he may have also briefly been awarded during his short-lived accommodation with Ibn Ra'iq. Abu Abdallah did not visit Basra to take up his appointment, now an empty and purely honorific title, but remained ensconced in Wasit. The deal was further secured by a marriage between Bajkam and Abu Abdallah's daughter, Sarah.

Although no side really trusted the other, this allowed a fragile calm to survive for about a year between Basra and Baghdad. Bajkam engaged in a campaign against the Buyids in the mountains of Jibal, which was beaten back by the third Buyid brother, Hasan. According to the medieval sources, this was actually part of Abu Abdallah's plan: he attacked some Buyid forts near Susa, provoking Ali ibn Buya to retaliate by attacking Wasit. Bajkam left Baghdad on a campaign to defend Wasit, and was victorious. It was then that Abu Abdallah suggested extending the campaign into Jibal, while he would launch a concurrent offensive from the south; in reality, he would use Bajkam's absence to capture Baghdad. The plan was betrayed while Bajkam was on campaign, forcing him to turn back. In late August 940, Bajkam removed al-Baridi from the vizierate and launched an attack on Wasit, which the Baridis abandoned without resistance. In December 940, Caliph al-Radi died, and Bajkam was forced to divert his attention from the Baridis to arrange the succession of al-Muttaqi (r. 940–944).

In spring 941, Bajkam again attacked the Baridis. The latter at first defeated his general, Tuzun, whereupon Bajkam himself left Wasit to take the field. On his way to join his army, however, he was informed that his generals had achieved a major victory over the Baridis, and decided to return to Wasit. On 21 April 941, he was killed by Kurdish brigands during a hunt.

== Fight for control of Baghdad ==
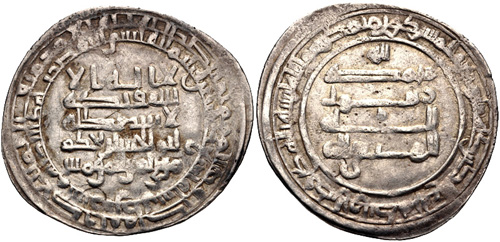
Silver dirham of al-Muttaqi, including the names of both the caliph and Bajkam as amir al-umara

Bajkam's death utterly transformed the situation for Abu Abdallah: where before he and his brothers had been contemplating abandoning Basra, now they were suddenly left as one of the two main contenders for power in Iraq alongside the caliph. The Baridis were further strengthened when Bajkam's Daylamites, some 1,500 in number, defected to them after clashing with the Turks, who in turn placed themselves in the caliph's service. Al-Muttaqi secured not only the Turks, but also Bajkam's enormous treasure; but the Baridis with their army, some 7,000 strong, moved to Wasit, from where Abu Abdallah demanded money from the caliph to pay his men; if no money was forthcoming, he would continue his advance on Baghdad. The capital was thrown into panic at this news, and al-Muttaqi mobilized the Turks to halt the Baridi advance at the Diyala canal. In the end, it was the caliph's indecisiveness that was his undoing: when he agreed to give some money to the Baridis, it only emboldened them, and led the Turks to also demand money in return for service. In the end, the Turks either defected to the Baridi banner or fled north to Mosul.

=== First capture of Baghdad and return of Ibn Ra'iq ===
Accompanied by his brother Abu'l-Husayn and his son Abu'l-Qasim, Abu Abdallah entered Baghdad on 31 May 941, and was received with the honours due to an amir al-umara, and met by the dignitaries of the court and capital. He immediately assumed the vizierate, with al-Muttaqi's appointee, Ahmad ibn Maymun resigning on 4 June, after only 33 days in office. To be safe, Abu Abdallah had Ahmad ibn Maymun arrested four days later, and later sent him to Wasit as inspector. The fears of the populace, arising from the Baridi's dreadful reputation, proved unfounded, but Abu Abdallah's stay in the capital was to prove short, due to his own avarice. As a device to extract even greater sums from the caliph, whom he did not visit even once, the Baridis had the soldiers clamour for money and threaten mutiny. But when the caliph indeed handed over half a million gold dinars, the soldiers started demanding that money from the Baridis. Under the leadership of Kurankij ibn Faradi, on 28 June they rioted and burned Abu'l-Husayn's residence. The uprising spread as the populace of East Baghdad also became involved against the Baridis, and Abu Abdallah, who was encamped on the western side, cut the bridge over the Tigris. As his men clashed with the caliph's soldiers on the river, the Baridis left the capital and returned to Wasit.

Kurankij now became amir al-umara, but his rule was also brief, as a resurgent Ibn Ra'iq entered Baghdad with his army in late August 941. Kurankij was imprisoned, and the Daylamites who had been his mainstay massacred. Ibn Ra'iq was re-appointed as amir al-umara on 23 September. When Abu Abdallah learned of Kurankij's downfall, he sent his brothers to capture Wasit, and acclaimed Ibn Ra'iq in the khutba. As the Baridis continued to withhold revenues, on 6 October, Ibn Ra'iq left Baghdad for Wasit. The Baridis fled to Basra, but on 28 November Ibn Ra'iq was faced with a mutiny of his troops under Tuzun and Nushtakin, who defected to Abu Abdallah. As a result, following the mediation of Ibn Ra'iq's secretary, Abu Abdallah Ahmad ibn Ali al-Kufi, Abu Abdallah agreed to a resumption of the tax farming contract, for 170,000 dinars in the current year, and 600,000 dinars for subsequent years.

=== Second capture of Baghdad and the Hamdanid intervention ===
Abu Abdallah once again received the vizierate, his fourth, around 9 December 941. He sent Abu Ja'far ibn Shirzad as his deputy to the capital, although the administration continued to be headed by Ibn Ra'iq's secretary, al-Kufi. When Abu Abdallah announced his intention of coming to Baghdad in person, Ibn Ra'iq removed him from office and replaced him with Abu Ishaq Muhammad ibn Ahmad al-Qarariti. The Baridis were publicly cursed in the mosques, and the people urged to take up arms against them. In response, Abu Abdallah sent his two brothers to attack Baghdad. A battle was fought near the Diyala on land and on the river on 7 March 942, although the clashes on the water lasted until 12 March. Ibn Ra'iq's troops were supported by the populace of Baghdad, but the Baridis prevailed, and entered the capital on 11 March. While the Baridi's Daylamite troops plundered the caliphal palaces, Ibn Ra'iq and his army, along with the caliph and his son, abandoned the city for Mosul, to place themselves under the protection of the local rulers, the Hamdanids.

Abu'l-Husayn al-Baridi now took position as governor of Baghdad, and instituted a regime of particular harshness. Taxes were collected with particular severity, and furthermore early in the year—what the chronicler Miskawayh describes as "the iniquity usual with [the Baridi] family—when the burden was felt the most; heavy duties were imposed on all goods sold by measure, and people were arrested and held hostage for money. Many farmers fled as a result and the prices of foodstuffs skyrocketed. Lawlessness was rife, as the various ethnic contingents of the Baridi army clashed with one another, and the mansions of the wealthy were looted. It is reported that 10,000 men lost their lives to famine, disease, or violence in the 110 days that his rule lasted. So unpopular did he become that Tuzun and other officers started plotting to overthrow him. When this was betrayed, they fled north for Mosul, where al-Muttaqi was now ensconced under the protection (and control) of the Hamdanids. In the meantime, Ibn Ra'iq had been murdered by the Hamdanid prince, Nasir al-Dawla, who now became amir al-umara.

At the encouragement of Tuzun and others, the Hamdanids now moved on Baghdad. Abu'l-Husayn abandoned the city and fled to Abu Abdallah in Wasit. After gathering the family's forces, Abu'l-Husayn led the Baridi army against the capital, while the Hamdanid forces set out to confront them under the command of Nasir al-Dawla's brother, Ali Sayf al-Dawla. A series of clashes followed on 16–19 August south of Mada'in, in which the Baridis were defeated with heavy losses. On the other hand, so depleted and exhausted were the Hamdanids that they were unable to pursue, allowing the Baridis to retreat to Basra unmolested.

The Hamdanid advance stalled quickly as Sayf al-Dawla ran out of funds, and as the Turkish commanders became increasingly insubordinate, on 7 May 943 Sayf al-Dawla abandoned the army and fled secretly to Baghdad. The situation so alarmed the Hamdanids that in June 943 they abandoned Baghdad and returned to Mosul. In the meantime, in late 942 the Buyid Ali ibn Buya attacked Basra, on the pretense that the caliph had written to him for this purpose. He scored some success, but when some of his officers defected to the Baridis, he abandoned the enterprise.

=== Final years and death ===
The Turk Tuzun, leader of the mutinous army, now assumed the title of amir al-umara and occupied Baghdad on 2 June. Barely three days later, Abu Abdallah exploited Tuzun's absence and took back Wasit, but soon he had to withdraw in the face of a new and unexpected threat: in August 943, Yusuf ibn Wajih, the ruler of Oman, sailed up the Shatt al-Arab, captured the city of al-Ubulla, and laid siege to Basra. The Baridis were saved when an enterprising sailor managed to set fire to the Omani fleet, forcing Ibn Wajih to depart.

Tuzun now pursued a peace with the Baridis of Basra, sealed with a marriage alliance with a daughter of Abu Abdallah. Their resources exhausted in the long contests for Baghdad, the Baridis began to turn on one another. In November 943, Abu Abdallah had his youngest brother, Abu Yusuf, assassinated, to acquire his wealth. Abu Abdallah died in June 944 after a week-long fever, leaving his son Abu'l-Qasim as ruler of Basra. The latter managed to prevail against his uncle, Abu'l-Husayn, and ruled Basra in "exemplary way" until 947, when the Buyids, fresh from their conquest of Baghdad, expelled him from the city, ending the Baridi family's power.

== Sources ==
- Amedroz, Henry F.; Margoliouth, David S., eds. (1921). The Eclipse of the 'Abbasid Caliphate. Original Chronicles of the Fourth Islamic Century, Vol. V: The concluding portion of The Experiences of Nations by Miskawaihi, Vol. II: Reigns of Muttaqi, Mustakfi, Muzi and Ta'i. Oxford: Basil Blackwell. OCLC 557740738.
- Bowen, Harold (1928). The Life and Times of ʿAlí Ibn ʿÍsà, ‘The Good Vizier’. Cambridge: Cambridge University Press. OCLC 386849.
- Canard, Marius (1960). "Badjkam". In Gibb, H. A. R.; Kramers, J. H.; Lévi-Provençal, E.; Schacht, J.; Lewis, B. & Pellat, Ch. (eds.). The Encyclopaedia of Islam, Second Edition. Volume I: A–B. Leiden: E. J. Brill. pp. 866–867. doi:10.1163/1573-3912_islam_SIM_1013. OCLC 495469456.
- Kennedy, Hugh (2004). The Prophet and the Age of the Caliphates: The Islamic Near East from the 6th to the 11th Century (Second ed.). Harlow: Longman. ISBN 978-0-582-40525-7.
- Sourdel, Dominique (1960). "al-Barīdī". In Gibb, H. A. R.; Kramers, J. H.; Lévi-Provençal, E.; Schacht, J.; Lewis, B. & Pellat, Ch. (eds.). The Encyclopaedia of Islam, Second Edition. Volume I: A–B. Leiden: E. J. Brill. pp. 1046–1047. OCLC 495469456.
