= Ibn Shirzad =

Amir al-umara of Abbasid caliph (945)

amir al-umara of the Abbasid Caliphate
- In office August 945 – 21 December 945
- Monarch: al-Mustakfi
- Preceded by: Tuzun (31 May 943 – August 945)
- Succeeded by: Mu'izz al-Dawla (945–967)

Katib of the Abbasid caliph
- In office January 946 – 16 March 946
- Monarch: al-Muti

Personal details
- Died: 946/48

Abu Ja'far Muhammad ibn Yahya ibn Zakariyya ibn Shirzad (died after 946), commonly known as Ibn Shirzad (Arabic: ابن شيرزاد), was an official of the Abbasid Caliphate, serving various warlords during the Caliphate's dissolution in the 940s, and himself briefly ascending to the supreme office of amir al-umara in 945.

== Life ==
=== Early career ===
Ibn Shirzad's early life and career is virtually unknown. He entered service as a scribe at a young age through his father, who was in charge of the fiscal bureau overseeing the former estates of Gharib al-Khal. Ibn Shirzad's brother, Abu'l-Husayn Zakariyya, was employed by their father as his deputy, but Ibn Shirzad preferred to make his own mark, and joined the bureau administering the private estates of the caliph (diwan al-diya' al-khassa), where he was taught the scribal trade.

He is first mentioned by the 10th-century historian Miskawayh in 927, as secretary and supervisor of affairs for Gharib's son, Harun, a companion of the Abbasid caliph al-Muqtadir (r. 908–932). At that time, Ibn Shirzad's brother, Abu'l-Hasan Zakariyya, was a secretary to an aunt of the caliph. Harun lodged a complaint against Ibn Shirzad, aiming to have him thrown in prison and his wealth confiscated; but the examination of the case by the vizier, Ali ibn Isa ibn al-Jarrah, brought about not only Ibn Shirzad's acquittal, but also his entry into government service as Ibn al-Jarrah's secretary.

In this role, he quickly gathered an enormous fortune. As a result, the vizier Muhammad ibn al-Qasim imprisoned him in order to extort his wealth. After promising to pay 20,000 gold dinars to the treasury, Ibn Shirzad was released with the aid of Abu Ya'qub Ishaq ibn Isma'il.

In 933/4 Ibn Shirzad was in charge of the fiscal department responsible for paying the Turkish troops of Baghdad. When Caliph al-Radi (r. 934–940) came to the throne, Harun ibn Gharib eyed the post of amir al-umara (commander-in-chief) of the Abbasid army. Al-Radi sent Ibn Shirzad to Harun many times, hoping to dissuade him from this course, until Harun was killed. In 935, Ibn Shirzad became head of the bureau of alms (zakat) after the death of the previous incumbent. When Ibn Ra'iq became amir al-umara and de facto ruler of Baghdad in 936, he sent Ibn Shirzad as envoy to the Baridis, a clan that ruled Basra and Ahwaz. Similar missions followed in 938 and in 939.

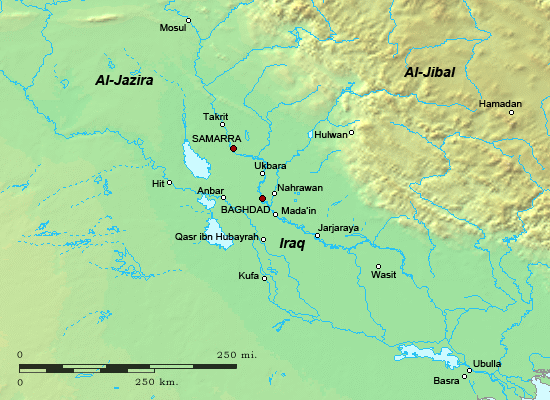
Map of Iraq in the 9th–10th centuries

In June 937, Ibn Shirzad was imprisoned at the orders of Abu Abdallah al-Kufi, the secretary of the commander Bajkam, and not let free before he paid a ransom of 90,000 gold dinars. In 939, Ibn Shirzad mediated the appointment of the head of the Baridi clan, Abu Abdallah al-Baridi, as vizier under Bajkam as amir al-umara. Later in the same year, he served as a peace envoy between the deposed amir al-umara, Ibn Ra'iq, and Bajkam. Bajkam appointed Ibn Shirzad as his own secretary, but he remained in office for about a year before he was arrested. Medieval historians report that his downfall was caused by his persistent attempts to secure a political marriage between Bajkam and a daughter of Abu Abdallah al-Baridi, but it is also likely that his considerable fortune played a role: before he was released, he was forced to pay no less than 150,000 dinars to Bajkam.

In October/November 940, Abu Abdallah al-Kufi confiscated Ibn Shirzad's properties in the name of Bajkam. However, it appears that there was some understanding, or even friendship, between the two men, for Abu Abdallah al-Kufi restored the deeds to these lands to Ibn Shirzad after Bajkam's death. When Bajkam sent men to kill Ibn Shirzad, the latter disguised himself as a woman and sought sanctuary in the household of caliph al-Muqtadir's aunt, where he remained until Bajkam's assassination in April 941. He then entered the service of the Baridis, but fled to Wasit when Yusuf ibn Wajih, the ruler of Oman laid siege to Basra in 943.

=== Service with Tuzun and rule as amir al-umara ===
At Wasit, in June 943, Ibn Shirzad joined with the warlord Tuzun, who then held the position of amir al-umara, and became his katib (chief secretary). In Baghdad, this appointment aroused suspicion: the governor of Baghdad, Muhammad al-Tarjuman, and the vizier, Abu'l-Hasan ibn Muqla, portrayed it as part of a plot with the Baridis, directed against Caliph al-Muttaqi. Ibn Shirzad's own behaviour did little to dispel these fears: sent ahead of Tuzun's army to take over Baghdad in his name, he governed with scant regard for the caliph. This led al-Muttaqi to seek the assistance of the Hamdanid emir of Mosul, Nasir al-Dawla: troops under Nasir al-Dawla's cousin arrived in Bagdad and escorted the caliph north, while Ibn Shirzad once again went into hiding. Following the departure of the Hamdanid troops, he re-emerged and began a regime that was portrayed by medieval chroniclers as one of despotism, corruption, famine and financial mismanagement, so that a gold dinar was worth as much as a silver dirham used to. In the meantime, al-Muttaqi went to Raqqa, seeking the protection, first of the Hamdanids of Mosul, and then of the ruler of Egypt, al-Ikhshid. Al-Ikhshid entreated the caliph to follow him to Egypt, but the latter refused, swayed by the solemn oaths sworn by Tuzun and Ibn Shirzad that he would not be harmed. In the event, when al-Muttaqi was blinded and replaced by al-Mustakfi.

Ibn Shirzad held his position until Tuzun's death in August 945, when he succeeded him as amir al-umara. Ibn Shirzad accepted the post only reluctantly; as a bureaucrat, he lacked Tuzun's authority with both the Turkish troops, as well as the caliph. He at first tried to have the Hamdanid, Nasir al-Dawla, who had previously held the office, reappointed, but failed as the troops insisted that Ibn Shirzad become amir al-umara. In addition, his financial policies were unsuccessful; while forcing the tax farmers to write off debts, he presided over a rise in prices and devaluation of money. His position deteriorated quickly: the governor he appointed over Jibal was ousted by the Samanids, his governor of Tikrit defected to Nasir al-Dawla, and finally the governor of Wasit defected to the advancing Buyid warlord, Mu'izz al-Dawla. Consequently Baghdad fell with little opposition: the Turks abandoned the city and went north to join Nasir al-Dawla, while Ibn Shirzad and the caliph went into hiding. Re-emerging from hiding, al-Mustakfi appointed Mu'izz al-Dawla as amir al-umara on 21 December 945.

=== Under the Buyids and Hamdanids ===
Ibn Shirzad immediately entered into Buyid service as katib of the new amir al-umara, now elevated de facto to a position similar to vizier. Following the deposition of al-Mustakfi, and the accession of Caliph al-Muti, Ibn Shirzad appears to have functioned in tandem as katib of the caliph as well.

He remained in office until 16 March 946, when he defected to the Buyid's rival, the Hamdanid warlord Nasir al-Dawla. During the subsequent Hamdanid occupation of Baghdad, he was appointed governor of the city, but fell under suspicion of conspiring with the Turkish troops and blinded by Nasir al-Dawla soon after.

== Sources ==
- Asef Fekrat, Mohammad (2015). "Abū Jaʿfar b. Shīrzād". In Madelung, Wilferd; Daftary, Farhad (eds.). Encyclopaedia Islamica Online. Translated by Ali Khazaee-far. Brill Online. doi:10.1163/1875-9831_isla_SIM_0160. ISSN 1875-9831.
- Bowen, Harold (1928). The Life and Times of ʿAlí Ibn ʿÍsà, ‘The Good Vizier’. Cambridge: Cambridge University Press.
- Busse, Heribert (2004) [1969]. Chalif und Grosskönig - Die Buyiden im Irak (945-1055) [Caliph and Great King - The Buyids in Iraq (945-1055)] (in German). Würzburg: Ergon Verlag. ISBN 3-89913-005-7.
- van Berkel, Maaike (2013). "The Bureaucracy". Crisis and Continuity at the Abbasid Court: Formal and Informal Politics in the Caliphate of al-Muqtadir (295-320/908-32). Leiden: BRILL. pp. 87–109. ISBN 978-90-04-25271-4.

Preceded by Tuzun	amir al-umara of the Abbasid Caliphate; August – 21 December 945	Succeeded by Mu'izz al-Dawla
