= Bajkam =

Turkish military commander (d. 941)

Abū al-Husayn Bajkam al-Mākānī
- أبو الحسين بجكم المكاني
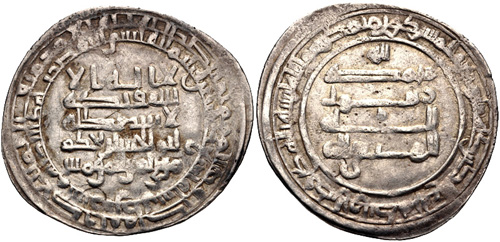
- Silver dirham of Al-Muttaqi AH 329 (940/941 CE), with the names of Caliph al-Muttaqi and Bajkam

amir al-umara of the Abbasid Caliphate
- In office September 938 – 21 April 941
- Monarchs: al-Radi, al-Muttaqi
- Preceded by: Muhammad ibn Ra'iq
- Succeeded by: Kurankij

Personal details
- Died: 21 April 941

Abū al-Husayn Bajkam al-Mākānī (Arabic: أبو الحسين بجكم المكاني), referred to as Bajkam, Badjkam or Bachkam (from Bäčkäm, a Persian and Turkish word meaning a horse- or yak-tail), was a Turkish military commander and official of the Abbasid Caliphate. A former ghulam of the Ziyarid dynasty, Bajkam entered Abbasid service following the assassination of the Ziyarid ruler Mardavij in 935. During his five-year tenure at the Caliphate's court at Baghdad, he was granted the title of amir al-umara, consolidating his dominance over the caliphs al-Radi and al-Muttaqi and giving him absolute power over their domains. Bajkam was challenged throughout his rule by various opponents, including his predecessor as amir al-umara, Muhammad ibn Ra'iq, the Basra-based Baridis, and the Buyid dynasty of Iran, but he succeeded in retaining control until his death. He was murdered by a party of Kurds during a hunting excursion in 941, shortly after the accession of al-Muttaqi as Caliph. Bajkam was known both for his firm rule and for his patronage of Baghdad intellectuals, who respected and in some cases befriended him. His death led to a void in central power, resulting in a brief period of instability and fighting in Baghdad.

== Early military career and service under Ibn Ra'iq ==
Details of Bajkam's early life are unknown. He was a Turk, and began his career as one of the ghilman (military slaves, usually of Turkish origin) of a vizier to the Daylamite warlord Makan ibn Kaki in northern Iran. His master then made a gift of his ghilman, including Bajkam, to Makan. The latter took care of the young Bajkam's training and education, something for which the latter showed his gratitude by adopting his patron's name as his nisba (surname).

After Makan was defeated by Mardavij, founder of the Ziyarid dynasty, who came to control Daylam, Jibal and Tabaristan, he entered Mardavij's service, along with many others among Makan's ghilman. Mardavij mistreated his ghilman, who consequently murdered him at Isfahan in January 935, an act in which Bajkam may have been complicit. After Mardavij's death, most of the ghilman in Ziyarid service dispersed. Bajkam and his fellow officer Tuzun assumed the leadership of a large group and, after first offering their services to the new governor of Jibal, Hasan ibn Harun, proceeded to the Abbasid court at Baghdad. At first, their offers were rejected by the court, where the Caliph's Hujariyya bodyguards jealously guarded their prerogatives, but the ghilman were eventually taken into the service of Muhammad ibn Ra'iq, governor of Basra and Wasit in southern Iraq. Now known as Bajkam Ra'iqi, Bajkam created a large military force under his command consisting of his own followers as well as additional Turks and Daylamites summoned from Jibal.

In early November 936, the Caliph al-Radi (r. 934–940) bestowed the newly created title of amir al-umara ("commander of commanders") on Ibn Ra'iq, who was effectively granted absolute control over the Caliphate. This provoked the reaction of various provincial governors as well as that of powerful interest groups in Baghdad itself, such as the caliphal bodyguards. Against them, Ibn Ra'iq employed Bajkam and his Turkish supporters. With their aid, he managed to neutralize the Hujariyya and Saji guard units, after which, in February 937, Bajkam was rewarded with the posts of sahib al-shurta (chief of police) and governor of the eastern provinces.

Far more difficult and protracted was the war against the ambitious governor of Ahwaz, Abu Abdallah al-Baridi, who aimed to supplant Ibn Ra'iq. Al-Baridi's family was of Basran origin, and had served the Abbasids in various roles as officials before managing to assert a weak hold over Khuzistan. Ibn Ra'iq himself was defeated and forced to leave Basra to the Baridis, but Bajkam saved the situation by scoring two major victories, despite being outnumbered, that allowed him to take possession of Khuzistan. The hard-pressed al-Baridi now turned to his powerful neighbour, the Buyid ruler of Fars, Ali ibn Buya, for help. Ali's brother Ahmad soon took over Khuzistan, and Ibn Ra'iq was forced to offer possession of the province as an independent domain if Bajkam would recover it. Bajkam however was repulsed by the Buyid forces, and fell back to Wasit.

Ignoring Ibn Ra'iq's orders to retake Khuzistan, Bajkam remained at Wasit, and began plotting to depose Ibn Ra'iq himself. To this end, Bajkam began seeking allies: he offered the governorship of Wasit to the Baridis, and through the former vizier Ibn Muqla, who wished to avenge himself on Ibn Ra'iq for his own downfall and confiscation of his property, gained the covert support of Caliph al-Radi himself. In September 938, Bajkam led his troops from Wasit to Baghdad. Ibn Ra'iq tried without success to impede his advance by destroying the great dams of the Nahrawan Canal and flooding the plain, but Bajkam's army entered the Abbasid capital without opposition, and al-Radi immediately transferred Ibn Ra'iq's title of amir al-umara to Bajkam.

== Amir al-umara ==
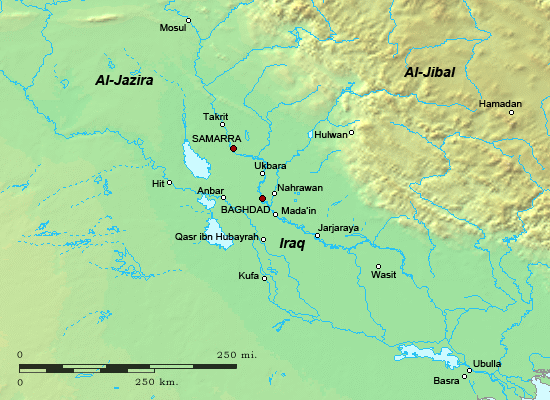
Map of Iraq in the 9th–10th centuries

Despite the continued relegation of al-Radi to a ceremonial role, the relationship between the Caliph and Bajkam was strong, with al-Radi praising Bajkam for his harsh discipline and referring to the latter as his "protégé". Al-Radi was appreciative of Bajkam's respect for his position as Caliph, and promised his support for the amir al-umara.

In October–November 938, Bajkam and the Caliph campaigned against the influential Hamdanid emir of Mosul, Hasan ibn Abdallah, who had taken advantage of the turmoil in Iraq to cease forwarding his province's revenue to Baghdad. Although Bajkam's army captured Mosul, Hasan fled before him to the remotest corners of his domain, where Bajkam's forces pursued him in vain. In the meantime, the local population resented the presence of the caliphal troops and launched guerilla warfare against them, while Ibn Ra'iq used Bajkam's absence to take control of Baghdad at the head of a Carmathian force. These developments forced Bajkam to negotiate with his rivals: the Hamdanids were restored in their province in exchange for the payment of the tax arrears, and Ibn Ra'iq was bought off with the governorship of the provinces of Tariq al-Furat, Diyar Mudar, Qinnasrin and al-'Awasim, which were also claimed by the Ikhshidids of Egypt. This arrangement allowed Bajkam and the Caliph to return to Baghdad in February 939.

Bajkam, having consolidated his control over Baghdad, now turned to face the threat posed by the Buyids. To this end, he strengthened his ties with the Baridis of Basra, by handing over Wasit, as previously agreed, appointing Abu Abdallah al-Baridi as vizier of the Abbasid court (although the latter remained at Wasit and did not visit Baghdad), and, finally, by marrying himself to one of al-Baridi's daughters. Neither side really trusted the other—Bajkam is said to have remarked of his father-in-law, an inveterate intriguer, that his "turban covered the head not of a man but of a devil"—but the deal allowed a fragile peace to prevail in Iraq.

Bajkam's success against the Buyids was mixed: Wasit was saved from Buyid attack, and the Baridis led a successful campaign in Susiana, but an expedition into Jibal was crushed by the third Buyid brother, Hasan. The alliance with the Baridis quickly soured, however, as al-Baridi still maintained his ambition of replacing Bajkam, and Bajkam was aware of this. In late August 940, Bajkam removed al-Baridi from the vizierate and launched an attack on Wasit, which the Baridis abandoned without resistance. In the meantime, the Baghdad was in turmoil as religious violence had become commonplace, with fanatical members of the Hanbali school imposing their tenets on the general populace.

In December 940, al-Radi died. Bajkam remained at Wasit, but sent his secretary to Baghdad to convene a council of Abbasid aristocrats, who selected al-Muttaqi (r. 940–944), al-Radi's brother, as Caliph. Bajkam also sent a slave named Takinak to the deceased Caliph's palace, the Dar al-Sultan, to procure various items, including the valuable al-Yatimah pearl. He also obtained three female slaves from al-Radi's palace, whose singing he remembered from his earlier visits to the Caliph.

Among al-Muttaqi's first actions as Caliph was the confirmation of Bajkam as amir al-umara. Despite al-Muttaqi's gesture of support, Bajkam still faced opposition among the semi-autonomous provincial governors, including al-Baridi.

== Death and ensuing anarchy ==
Bajkam opened a campaign against al-Baridi in early spring 941. His lieutenants were at first defeated by the Baridis, whereupon Bajkam himself left Wasit to take the field. On his way to join his army, however, he was informed that his generals had achieved a major victory over the Baridis, and decided to return to Wasit. On 21 April 941, while travelling, he took part in a hunting excursion, during which he and his party encountered a band of Kurdish brigands. During a brief skirmish, Bajkam was slain when one of the Kurds stabbed him in the back with his lance.

Bajkam's unexpected death created a power vacuum in Baghdad, with disagreements between Daylamite and Turkish forces prompting the former to join the defeated al-Baridi. With their assistance, he marched on Wasit and Baghdad, capturing them, but was soon forced to flee due to the disorder that followed his usurpation of power. A Daylamite chief named Kurankij replaced him as de facto ruler of Baghdad, but he imposed tyrannical rule, and al-Muttaqi appealed to the former amir al-umara Ibn Ra'iq for assistance.

Ibn Ra'iq soon retook control of Baghdad, but political turmoil did not cease with his re-installation as amir al-umara. Once again, al-Baridi captured the city, and Ibn Ra'iq fled with the Caliph to Mosul, from where the Hamdanid rulers launched a successful attempt to restore them. The Hamdanid emir Hasan, after ordering the assassination of Ibn Ra'iq, was made amir al-umara and given the laqab of Nasir al-Dawla ("Defender of the Dynasty"). In 943, the Hamdanids were forced to retreat to Mosul when Tuzun, one of Bajkam's officers, seized power with military support; the following year, Tuzun captured, blinded, and deposed al-Muttaqi, assuming the role of amir al-umara. The Caliph's brother, al-Mustakfi (r. 944–946), was appointed as his successor. The competition for control of the Caliph ended in 945, when the Buyid Ahmad took over the position of amir al-umara with the title of Mu'izz al-Dawla. This began the period of undisputed Buyid control over Baghdad and Iraq, which lasted until the Seljuk conquest in the 1050s.

== Character ==
Despite his slave origin, Bajkam was educated in Arabic (although he reportedly did not speak it for fear of making mistakes), respected by intellectuals and was known to seek the company of such men as al-Suli and the physician Sinan ibn Thabit. It is in their writings that glimpses of his character survive. According to the researcher Marius Canard, Bajkam was "covetous of power and money, he did not hesitate to resort to dissimulation and ruse, corruption and torture to attain his ends; he was at times cruel, though his bravery was legendary, and was more upright in character than Ibn Ra'iq". Bajkam was also solicitous for the welfare of his subjects, and especially the inhabitants of Wasit cherished his memory.

== See also ==
- Ahmad ibn Tulun
- Al-Mustakfi
- Ashinas
- Azjur al-Turki
- Bugha al-Kabir
- Bugha al-Sharabi
- Itakh
- Muhammad ibn Ra'iq
- Muzahim ibn Khaqan
- Salih ibn Wasif
- Tuzun (amir al-umara)
- Utamish
- Wasif al-Turki

== Sources ==
- Bowen, Harold (1928). The Life and Times of ʿAlí Ibn ʿÍsà, ‘The Good Vizier’. Cambridge: Cambridge University Press.
- Busse, Heribert (1975). "Iran under the Būyids". In Frye, Richard N. (ed.). The Cambridge History of Iran: From the Arab Invasion to the Saljuqs. Vol. 4. Cambridge: Cambridge University Press. pp. 250–304. ISBN 0-521-20093-8.
- Canard, Marius (1960). "Badjkam". In Gibb, H. A. R.; Kramers, J. H.; Lévi-Provençal, E.; Schacht, J.; Lewis, B. & Pellat, Ch. (eds.). The Encyclopaedia of Islam, Second Edition. Volume I: A–B. Leiden: E. J. Brill. pp. 866–867. doi:10.1163/1573-3912_islam_SIM_101. OCLC 495469456.
- Mottahedeh, Roy P. (2001). Loyalty and leadership in an early Islamic society (Revised ed.). London: Tauris. ISBN 1860641814.
- Nagel, Tilman (1990). "Buyids". In Yarshater, Ehsan (ed.). Encyclopædia Iranica. Vol. IV/6: Burial II–Calendars II. London and New York: Routledge & Kegan Paul. pp. 578–586. ISBN 978-0-71009-129-1.
- Qaddūmī, Ghādah Hijjāwī (1996). Book of Gifts and Rarities: Kitāb al-hadāyā wa al-tuạf. Forewords by Oleg Grabar and Annemarie Schimmel. Cambridge, Mass.: Harvard University Press. ISBN 0932885136.
- Shalem, Avinoam (1997). "Jewels and Journeys: The Case of the Medieval Gemstone Called al-Yatima". Muqarnas. XIV.

Preceded by Muhammad ibn Ra'iq	amir al-umara of the Abbasid Caliphate; September 938 – 21 April 941	Succeeded by Kurankij
