= Tuzun (amir al-umara) =

Amir al-umara of Abbasid caliph (943–945)

Abu'l-Wafa Tuzun
- توزون

amir al-umara of the Abbasid Caliphate
- In office 31 May 943 – August 945
- Monarchs: al-Muttaqi, al-Mustakfi
- Preceded by: Nasir al-Dawla (18 Feb 942 – 11 May 943)
- Succeeded by: Ibn Shirzad (Aug 945 – 21 Dec 945)

Personal details
- Died: August 945 Baghdad

Abu'l-Wafa Tuzun, commonly known as Tuzun (Arabic: توزون), was a Turkish soldier who served first the Iranian ruler Mardavij ibn Ziyar and subsequently the Abbasid Caliphate. Rising to a position of leadership in the Abbasid army, he evicted the Hamdanid Nasir al-Dawla from Baghdad and assumed the position of amir al-umara in 943, becoming the Caliphate's de facto ruler. He held this position until his death in August 945, a few months before Baghdad, and the Abbasid Caliphate with it, came under the control of the Buyids.

== Early career ==
Tuzun was a Turkish slave-soldier (ghulam or mamluk), who initially served the autonomous Iranian ruler Mardavij ibn Ziyar. After the assassination of Mardavij in 935, many of his soldiers left to enter service under the powerful Abbasid governor of Wasit, Ibn Ra'iq. With their support, in 936 Ibn Ra'iq managed to secure the Caliph al-Radi's invitation to take over the effective administration of what remained of the Caliphate, under the title of amir al-umara. Among Ibn Ra'iq's first actions were the disbandment of the old caliphal army, leaving his Turkish troops as one of the main power factors in the struggle for control of the Caliph and his court, a struggle that soon drew in ambitious neighbouring potentates like the Hamdanids of the Jazira and the Baridis of Basra. In this complicated struggle, Ibn Ra'iq was deposed in 938 by Bajkam, who like Tuzun had once served Mardavij and had come west with him. Ibn Ra'iq recovered his position in 941, after Bajkam's death, only to be assassinated and replaced the following year by the Hamdanid emir Nasir al-Dawla.

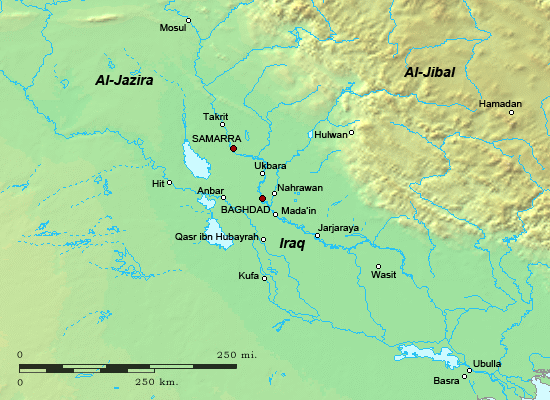
Map of Iraq in the 9th–10th centuries

During this period, Tuzun played an active role. He is first mentioned in early 941, when the Baridis moved against Baghdad, and he was tasked by Bajkam, along with Nushtakin, with confronting them. Battle was joined at Madhar, which at first went against the Baghdad troops, but eventually Tuzun and Nushtakin prevailed and routed the Baridis. Bajkam was killed, however, by Kurdish brigands on 21 April, and turmoil ensued: Caliph al-Muttaqi appointed a vizier of his own, but was soon compelled to install the Baridi leader Abu Abdallah al-Baridi in the post, who held it until an army mutiny resulted in the appointment of the Daylamite leader Kurankij as amir al-umara (1 July). In the meantime, following Bajkam's death, Tuzun, Nushtakin, Khajkhaj and several other Turkish military leaders at first went north to Mosul and tried to enter the employ of Nasir al-Dawla, but he turned them away. As a result, they turned to Ibn Ra'iq, who used the opportunity to recover his old post (23 September). In November, however, Tuzun and other Turkish leaders mutinied against Ibn Ra'iq and deserted him for the Baridis. This increased the latter's strength an emboldened them to march on Baghdad: on 7 March 942 the Baridi troops fought their way into the city, while Ibn Ra'iq and the Caliph withdrew north to seek the aid of the Hamdanids. Now master of the capital, the head of the Baridi family Abu'l-Husayn appointed Tuzun as sahib al-shurta of the eastern half of the city, across the Tigris. Baridi rule soon proved unpopular, however, as the plunder of his undisciplined Daylamites was coupled with a sharp rise in prices and stifling taxation. Tuzun and the other Turks conspired to seize Abu'l-Husayn, but was betrayed by Nushtakin, and his attack on the Baridis' palace was repulsed by the forewarned Daylamite troops. Tuzun then abandoned Baghdad and with many of the Turks marched north to Mosul. Strengthened by these defections, the Hamdanids marched south onto Baghdad, which the Baridis abandoned. This was followed by the murder of Ibn Ra'iq by the Hamdanids (11 April 942) and the accession of Nasir al-Dawla to the post of amir al-umara a few days later. Tuzun in turn was rewarded with the post of sahib al-shurta of the capital on both sides of the river.

The Baridis continued to challenge the Hamdanid position from their base in Wasit, however, and Tuzun was one of the commanders of the army sent against them under Nasir al-Dawla's brother Ali, better known by his laqab of Sayf al-Dawla. In a hotly contested battle near al-Mada'in that lasted from 16 to 19 August 942, the Hamdanid and Turkish troops routed the Baridis, who abandoned Wasit for their original base of Basra. Sayf al-Dawla occupied Wasit, but by the spring of 943, the Turkish troops and their leaders, chiefly Tuzun and Khajkhaj, had become restless and mutinous due to delays in their pay, while, according to Ibn Miskawayh, Sayf al-Dawla tried to win them over for his own designs on Syria by slighting his brother. In the end, on the night of 7 May 943, the Turkish troops attacked Sayf al-Dawla's encampment and set fire to it. The Hamdanid was able to escape through the desert to Baghdad, while at Wasit the Turkish officers acclaimed Tuzun as their chief (amir), bringing him myrtle and herbs in accordance with ancient Persian custom, and Khajkhaj was made commander-in-chief (ispahsalar).

== Amir al-umara of Caliphate ==
On learning of the Turkish revolt, the Baridis began to move against Wasit and sent an envoy to Tuzun urging him to march on Baghdad, and requesting the rights of tax-farming in Wasit. Tuzun gave a non-committal answer, but his spies soon informed him that Khajkhaj was planning to desert to the Baridis. On 20 May, Tuzun with his retainers surprised Khajkhaj in his bed, seized him and blinded him. Leaving 300 men under Kaighalagh to safeguard Wasit, Tuzun marched on Baghdad. There Sayf al-Dawla had promised the Caliph to resist, but on the Turks' approach, the Hamdanid and his officers fled north, and on 3 June, Tuzun entered the capital and was named amir al-umara by the Caliph.

Tuzun's first act was to march south against Wasit, which Kaighalagh had been forced to abandon in the face of Baridi superiority. On his way south he met with Muhammad ibn Shirzad, a defector from the Baridis, whom he appointed as his personal secretary. Tuzun pursued a peace with the Baridis, who now had to face an unexpected attack by Yusuf ibn Wajih, the ruler of Oman, on Basra itself. The deal was sealed with a marriage alliance between Tuzun and a daughter of Abu Abdallah al-Baridi. Back in Baghdad, however, the news of the peace between Tuzun and the Baridis was not welcomed: the vizier Abu'l-Husayn ibn Muqla distrusted both Tuzun and especially Ibn Shirzad. Fearing for his own position if he could not satisfy the financial demands of the Turks, he made contact with the Hamdanids. A Hamdanid army under Nasir al-Dawla's cousin Abu Abdallah al-Husayn appeared before the Harb Gate of Baghdad, and both the vizier and the Caliph went over to him and were escorted north to Mosul. Hearing about these events, Tuzun quickly granted al-Baridi the tax-farming of Wasit and returned to Baghdad with his troops.

Tuzun followed the Hamdanids north, heavily defeated Sayf al-Dawla in two battles near Tikrit, and captured Mosul. The Hamdanid brothers and the Caliph to abandon Mosul for Nisibis, from where the Caliph and his entourage, accompanied by Sayf al-Dawla, went to Raqqa. An agreement was concluded between Tuzun and the Hamdanids on 26 May 944, whereby Nasir al-Dawla renounced his claims on the Caliphate's core lands in central Iraq, receiving in return recognition for his control over the Jazira and his claims over Syria. The Hamdanid was also obliged to pay an annual tribute of 3.6 million dirhams. In the meantime, Caliph al-Muttaqi, who resented the dominance of the various warlords and tried to recover the independence and authority of his office, had contacted the powerful and virtually independent ruler of Egypt, Muhammad ibn Tughj al-Ikhshid. In response, the Ikhshid launched a campaign across Syria and in August 944 met with the Caliph at Raqqa, where he tried to persuade al-Muttaqi to move to Egypt. Al-Muttaqi refused, and instead returned to Baghdad, trusting the assurances of Tuzun. As the Caliph approached the capital, however, Tuzun met him and had him blinded and deposed in favour of al-Mustakfi.

Until his death in August 945, Tuzun remained in control in Baghdad, but his position was increasingly threatened by the ambitions of a new power, the Buyids, and particularly Ahmad ibn Buya. A first Buyid attack on Baghdad in 944 was repelled, but after Tuzun's death, Muhammad ibn Shirzad was unable to enforce his authority, and on 17 January 946, Ahmad entered Baghdad as the new amir al-umara and overlord of the Caliphate.

== Bibliography ==
- Amedroz, Henry F.; Margoliouth, David S., eds. (1921). The Eclipse of the 'Abbasid Caliphate. Original Chronicles of the Fourth Islamic Century, Vol. V: The concluding portion of The Experiences of Nations by Miskawaihi, Vol. II: Reigns of Muttaqi, Mustakfi, Muzi and Ta'i. Oxford: Basil Blackwell.
- Bacharach, Jere L. (2006). Islamic History through Coins: An Analysis and Catalogue of Tenth-Century Ikhshidid Coinage. Cairo: The American University in Cairo Press. ISBN 977-424-930-5.
- Bowen, Harold (1928). The Life and Times of ʿAlí Ibn ʿÍsà, ‘The Good Vizier’. Cambridge: Cambridge University Press.
- Donohue, John J. (2003). The Buwayhid Dynasty in Iraq 334 H./945 to 403 H./1012: Shaping Institutions for the Future. Leiden and Boston: Brill. ISBN 90-04-12860-3.
- Kennedy, Hugh (2004) [1986]. The Prophet and the Age of the Caliphates: The Islamic Near East from the 6th to the 11th Century (Second ed.). Harlow: Longman. ISBN 978-0-582-40525-7.

Preceded by Nasir al-Dawla	amir al-umara of the Abbasid Caliphate; 31 May 943 – August 945	Succeeded by Muhammad ibn Shirzad
