= Tüzün =

Tüzün or Tuzun is a Turkish name. Notable people with the name include:

- Oğuzhan Tüzün (born 1982), Turkish sport shooter
- Serpil Hamdi Tüzün, Turkish football coach
- Sibel Tüzün (born 1971), Turkish female pop/rock/jazz singer
- Tuzun, Turkic general and Abbasid official
- Yaşar Tüzün (born 1966), Turkish politician
