= Muhammad ibn Ra'iq =

10th-century Abbasid senior official

amir al-umara of the Abbasid Caliphate
- In office 21 September 941 – 13 February 942
- Monarch: al-Muttaqi
- Preceded by: Kurankij
- Succeeded by: Abu Abdallah al-Baridi (as vizier)

amir al-umara of the Abbasid Caliphate
- In office 10 November 936 – 9 September 938
- Monarch: al-Radi
- Preceded by: Ibn Muqla (as vizier)
- Succeeded by: Bajkam

Personal details
- Died: 13 February 942

Abu Bakr Muhammad ibn Ra'iq (died 13 February 942), usually simply known as Ibn Ra'iq, was a senior official of the Abbasid Caliphate, who exploited the caliphal government's weakness to become the first amir al-umara ("commander of commanders", generalissimo and de facto regent) of the Caliphate in 936. Deposed by rival Turkish military leaders in 938, he regained the post in 941 and kept it until his assassination in February 942.

== Biography ==
=== Early career ===
Muhammad ibn Ra'iq's father was of Khazar origin and served as a military officer under Caliph al-Mu'tadid (r. 892–902). Together with his brother Ibrahim, Muhammad ibn Ra'iq was a protege of the commander-in-chief Mu'nis al-Muzaffar. Thanks to his favour, the two brothers were appointed to the post of chief of the police (sahib al-shurta) after the failed coup against Caliph al-Muqtadir (r. 908–932) in March 929, in which the previous incumbent, Nazuk, had been involved. They were replaced by Muhammad ibn Yaqut a year later.

=== Defection from Mu'nis and the death of al-Muqtadir ===
When Mu'nis assumed full control of the government in 931, dismissing the Caliph's favourites, he appointed Muhammad and Ibrahim, again jointly, as the caliph's chamberlains (hajib). They used this position to acquire considerable influence over al-Muqtadir, thus reducing their dependency, and loyalty, to their patron Mu'nis: when the caliphal faction gained ascendancy over Mu'nis with the appointment of al-Husayn ibn al-Qasim as vizier, the two brothers quickly shifted their allegiance after being told of a rumour that Mu'nis was considering dismissing them.

Following Mu'nis' departure from Baghdad, the two brothers joined the faction of Muhammad ibn Yaqut, who opposed a rapprochement with him, and urged al-Muqtadir to oppose a return of the general to Baghdad by force. Al-Muqtadir vacillated long between them and the faction around the vizier al-Fadl ibn Ja'far ibn al-Furat and the caliph's influential cousin, Harun ibn Gharib, who were in favour of a reconciliation. When Mu'nis marched on Baghdad, the Caliph rode out to confront him and was killed in the ensuing battle. Mu'nis thus emerged as the undisputed king-maker and dictator of the Caliphate.

=== Return to office ===
With the triumph of Mu'nis and the accession of al-Qahir (r. 932–934), Muhammad and his brother abandoned Baghdad, as did the other members of the court who had opposed Mu'nis. The two sons of Ra'iq were soon enticed back, however, as Muhammad was offered the governorship of Basra. Returning to favour, he obtained the governorship of Wasit on the accession of al-Radi (r. 934–940).

The frequent coups and violent struggle for control of the Caliphate had by this time greatly enfeebled the central government. Effective control over the Maghreb and Khurasan had long been lost, but now autonomous local dynasties emerged in the provinces closer to Iraq: Egypt and Syria were ruled by the Ikhshidids, the Hamdanids had secured control over the Jazira—the "island" plain between the Tigris and Euphrates in upper Mesopotamia—while most of Iran was ruled by Daylamite warlords, among whom the Buyids became prominent. Even in Iraq itself, the authority of the caliphal government was challenged. Thus in the south, around Basra, the Baridi family under Abu Abdallah al-Baridi established its own domain, often refusing to send tax revenues to Baghdad and establishing contacts with the Buyids of Fars.

=== First emirate and downfall ===
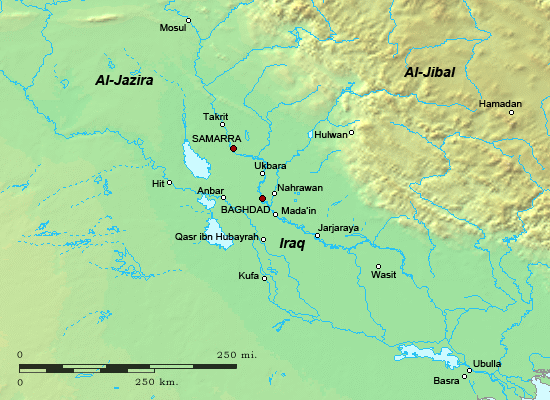
Map of Iraq in the 9th–10th centuries

In this atmosphere of disintegration, Ibn Ra'iq likewise refused to send his province's revenue to Baghdad. The Caliph's vizier, Ibn Muqla, tried to restore central control, but his expedition against the Hamdanids in 935 failed to achieve any lasting results and his attempt to campaign against Ibn Ra'iq in the next spring failed to even get off the ground, and he was himself arrested.

Al-Radi was now forced to turn to Ibn Ra'iq for support, even though he had dismissed such a proposal in 935. Thus, in 936 Ibn Ra'iq came to Baghdad and assumed de facto control over the caliphal government with the title of amir al-umara ("commander of the commanders"). The post entailed overall command over the army, as well as the supervision of the civil administration, hitherto the province of the vizier. The caliph was deprived of any say in affairs of state, and sidelined to a purely symbolic role.

The main pillars of Ibn Ra'iq's regime were the Turkish troops under Bajkam and Tuzun, former subordinates of Mardavij. To secure his own position, Ibn Ra'iq even massacred the old caliphal bodyguard, the Hujariyya, destroying the last body of troops still loyal to the Abbasid dynasty. Ibn Ra'iq's authority was soon weakened, however, when he fell out with the Baridis of Ahwaz, who had initially supported his rise to power. When he tried to deprive them of their province, they resumed their contacts with the Buyids. Finally, it was discontent among the Turkish military that led to his downfall: the Turks under Bajkam rose up against him, and after a brief struggle, Bajkam became the new amir al-umara in September 938, while Ibn Ra'iq was sent to govern Diyar Mudar.

The struggle between Bajkam and Ibn Ra'iq had one long-term and disastrous consequence: trying to impede Bajkam's advance towards Baghdad, Ibn Ra'iq ordered the blocking of the Nahrawan Canal to flood the countryside. This action did not avail Ibn Ra'iq, but it heavily impaired the local agriculture for centuries to come, since the canal played a central role in the ancient irrigation system of the Sawad. As Hugh N. Kennedy writes, "the breach of the Nahrawan canal was simply the most dramatic example of a widespread phenomenon of the time; and it was symbolic of the end of 'Abbasid power just as the breach of the Marib Dam was of the end of the prosperity of pre-Islamic south Arabia".

=== Second emirate and death ===
Bajkam remained amir al-umara until his death in April 941. Bajkam's unexpected death created a power vacuum in Baghdad, with disagreements between Daylamite and Turkish forces prompting the former to join the defeated al-Baridi, while many of the latter fled north to Mosul and thence came to join Ibn Ra'iq in Damascus. The Baridis briefly captured Baghdad, but a revolt of their soldiery drove them out, and the Daylamite chief named Kurankij became amir al-umara. Al-Muttaqi appealed to Ibn Ra'iq for assistance against Kurankij. Ibn Ra'iq marched on Baghdad and managed to sideline and imprison Kurankij. The Daylamites who had been his mainstay were massacred, and Ibn Ra'iq was re-appointed as amir al-umara on 23 September.

He did not long enjoy it, however, as in early 942 he was assassinated at the orders of the Hamdanid prince Nasir al-Dawla, who soon succeeded him as amir al-umara.

== Family ==
Ibn Ra'iq was married to a sister of Ja'far ibn al-Furat, scion of an Iraqi bureaucratic dynasty and the longtime vizier of the Ikhshidid dynasty of Egypt. Their son Muzahim was originally held as a hostage in the Ikhshidid court, but later rose to become a senior commander in the Ikhshidid army and marry an Ikhshidid princess.

== Sources ==
- Amedroz, Henry F.; Margoliouth, David S., eds. (1921). The Eclipse of the 'Abbasid Caliphate. Original Chronicles of the Fourth Islamic Century, Vol. V: The concluding portion of The Experiences of Nations by Miskawaihi, Vol. II: Reigns of Muttaqi, Mustakfi, Muzi and Ta'i. Oxford: Basil Blackwell.
- Bianquis, Thierry (1972). "La prise de pouvoir par les Fatimides en Égypte (357‑363/968‑974)" [The Seizure of Power by the Fatimids in Egypt (357–363/968–974)]. Annales Islamologiques (in French). XI: 49–108. doi:10.3406/anisl.1972.950. S2CID 259055451.
- Bowen, Harold (1928). The Life and Times of ʿAlí Ibn ʿÍsà, ‘The Good Vizier’. Cambridge: Cambridge University Press.
- Donohue, John J. (2003). The Buwayhid Dynasty in Iraq 334 H./945 to 403 H./1012: Shaping Institutions for the Future. Leiden and Boston: Brill. ISBN 90-04-12860-3.
- Kennedy, Hugh (2004) [1986]. The Prophet and the Age of the Caliphates: The Islamic Near East from the 6th to the 11th Century (Second ed.). Harlow: Longman. ISBN 978-0-582-40525-7.
- Sourdel, Dominique (1971). "Ibn Rāʾiḳ". In Lewis, B.; Ménage, V. L.; Pellat, Ch. & Schacht, J. (eds.). The Encyclopaedia of Islam, Second Edition. Volume III: H–Iram. Leiden: E. J. Brill. p. 902. OCLC 495469525.

Preceded by Ibn Muqla as Vizier	amir al-umara of the Abbasid Caliphate; 10 November 936 – 9 September 938	Succeeded by Bajkam
Preceded by Kurankij	amir al-umara of the Abbasid Caliphate; 23 September 941 – 13 February 942	Succeeded by Abu Abdallah al-Baridi as Vizier
