= Al-Qahir =

19th Abbasid Caliph (r. 932–934)

al-Qahir القاهر
- Caliph; Commander of the Faithful
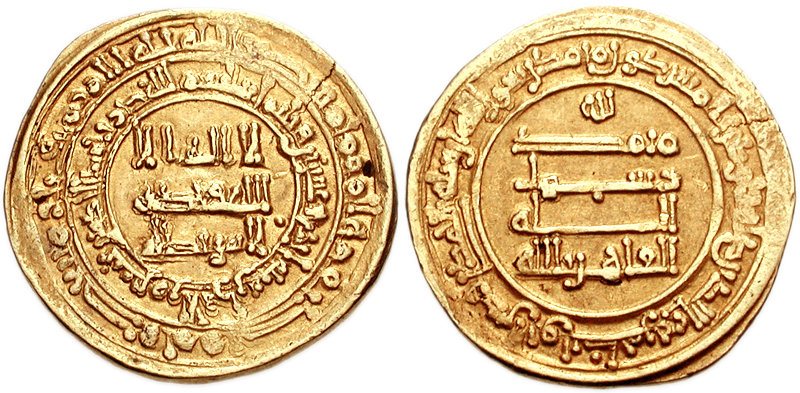
- Gold dinar of al-Qahir

19th Caliph of the Abbasid Caliphate
- Reign: 1 March 929 – 2 March 929 (1st reign)
- Predecessor: al-Muqtadir
- Successor: al-Muqtadir
- Reign: 31 October 932 – 24 April 934 (2nd reign)
- Predecessor: al-Muqtadir
- Successor: al-Radi
- Born: 899; Baghdad, Iraq
- Died: 950 (aged 50–51); Baghdad
- Consort: Umm al-Mansur
- Issue: Mansur
Names
- Abu al-Manṣūr Muḥammad ibn Aḥmad al-Qāhir bi'llāh
- Dynasty: Abbasid
- Father: al-Mu'tadid
- Mother: Fitnah
- Religion: Sunni Islam

Abū al-Manṣūr Muḥammad ibn Aḥmad ibn Ṭalḥa ibn Jaʿfar ibn Muḥammad ibn Hārūn al-Qāhir bi'Llāh (Arabic: أبو المنصور محمد بن أحمد المعتضد, romanized: Abū al-Manṣūr Muḥammad ibn Aḥmad al-Muʿtaḍid), usually known simply by his regnal title al-Qahir bi'Llah (Arabic: القاهر بالله, romanized: al-Qāhir bi'Llāh, lit. 'Victorious by the will of God'), was the nineteenth caliph of the Abbasid Caliphate from 932 to 934. He was born 286 AH (899 C.E.) and died 339 AH (950 C.E.).

== Early life ==
Al-Qahir was a son of the 16th Abbasid caliph, al-Mu'tadid (r. 892–902), and brother of the 18th Caliph, al-Muqtadir (r. 908–932). The mother of al-Qahir was a concubine called Fitnah. His full name was Muhammad ibn Ahmad al-Mu'tadid al-Qahir bi'llah, and his kunya was Abu Mansur.

== Rise to the throne ==
Al-Qahir came to the throne as part of his brother's conflict with the increasingly powerful commander-in-chief, Mu'nis al-Muzaffar. He was first chosen as Caliph in March 929, when Mu'nis launched a coup and deposed al-Muqtadir. Although al-Muqtadir was restored after a few days, Mu'nis now possessed virtually dictatorial authority over the Abbasid government.

In 932, after another breach with al-Muqtadir, Mu'nis marched on Baghdad. Al-Muqtadir tried to confront him, and was killed in the ensuing battle. However, in the subsequent assembly of dignitaries, Mu'nis' candidacy of al-Muqtadir's son Ahmad (the future al-Radi) was rejected in favour of al-Qahir (31 October 932). He was then 35 years old.

== Caliphate ==
The new caliph became quickly became estranged with Mu'nis. The caliph resumed contacts with the defeated court faction, and found himself soon under confinement in his palace. Nevertheless, in August 933 al-Qahir managed to lure Mu'nis and his main lieutenants to the palace, where they were executed.

The new caliph had a pronounced "headstrong and vindictive personality", according to Dominique Sourdel, which made itself felt soon after his accession, when he tortured his brother's sons and officials, as well as al-Muqtadir's mother Shaghab, to extract their fortune. He was more energetic than his predecessor and cultivated an image of austerity and puritanism at his court, in deliberate contrast to the extravagantly dissolute life led by al-Muqtadir, but behind the scenes he too indulged in drunkenness.

Trying to counteract the influence of Mu'nis and of the vizier Ibn Muqla, who controlled government, and re-assert the power of his office, al-Qahir resumed contacts with the defeated court faction through Muhammad ibn Yaqut. This alarmed Mu'nis and his supporters, but they were too late. In July 933, al-Qahir struck: the plans of the chamberlain Ibn Yalbaq to depose him were thwarted, and he and Mu'nis were arrested and executed, while Ibn Muqla was forced to flee the capital.

Al-Qahir appointed Muhammad ibn al-Qasim ibn Ubayd Allah as vizier. Al-Qahir embarked on a firmly anti-Shi'a policy, declaring himself the "Avenger of the enemies of the Faith" (al-muntaqim min aʿdāʾ dīn Allāh), a slogan which he even put on his coins. Despite his support of the Caliph's anti-Shi'a policies, Muhammad ibn al-Qasim was soon dismissed in favour of Ahmad al-Khasibi. Like his predecessor, however, al-Khasibi was unable to overcome the mounting financial crisis of the state.

The contemporary Baghdadi historian al-Mas'udi, in his Meadows of Gold, reports that "His fits of violence made him the fear and terror of his subjects". He went about armed with a lance, striking down those who displeased him. However, the very "inconstancy of his behaviour and the horror inspired by his rages" alienated the populace and the court alike, and prepared the ground for his downfall.

== Downfall and death ==
The exiled vizier Ibn Muqla continued plotting against al-Qahir; he won over the caliphal guard, which on 24 April 934 staged a coup and took the Caliph prisoner while the latter was drunk.

Refusing to abdicate in favour of al-Radi (r. 932–940), he was blinded and cast into prison. According to al-Mas'udi, al-Radi "kept news of him hidden", so that he vanished from common knowledge. He was not freed until eleven years later, when al-Mustakfi (r. 944–946) came to the throne and discovered him locked away in a remote room in the palace. He lived the remainder of his life as a beggar, dying in October 950.

== Sources ==
- Bonner, Michael (2010). "The waning of empire, 861–945". In Robinson, Chase F. (ed.). The New Cambridge History of Islam, Volume 1: The Formation of the Islamic World, Sixth to Eleventh Centuries. Cambridge: Cambridge University Press. pp. 305–359. ISBN 978-0-521-83823-8.
- Bowen, H. (1993). "Muʾnis al-Muẓaffar". In Bosworth, C. E.; van Donzel, E.; Heinrichs, W. P. & Pellat, Ch. (eds.). The Encyclopaedia of Islam, Second Edition. Volume VII: Mif–Naz. Leiden: E. J. Brill. p. 575. ISBN 978-90-04-09419-2.
- Kennedy, Hugh (2004) [1986]. The Prophet and the Age of the Caliphates: The Islamic Near East from the 6th to the 11th Century (Second ed.). Harlow: Longman. ISBN 978-0-582-40525-7.
- Masudi (2010) [1989]. The Meadows of Gold: The Abbasids. Translated by Paul Lunde and Caroline Stone. London and New York: Routledge. ISBN 978-0-7103-0246-5.
- Sourdel, Dominique (1978). "al-Ḳāhir Bi'llāh". In van Donzel, E.; Lewis, B.; Pellat, Ch. & Bosworth, C. E. (eds.). The Encyclopaedia of Islam, Second Edition. Volume IV: Iran–Kha. Leiden: E. J. Brill. pp. 423–424. ISBN 978-90-04-05745-6. OCLC 758278456.
- Zetterstéen, K. V. (1987). "al-Ḳāhir Bi 'llāh". In Houtsma, Martijn Theodoor (ed.). E.J. Brill's first encyclopaedia of Islam, 1913–1936, Volume IV: 'Itk–Kwaṭṭa. Leiden: Brill. p. 627. doi:10.1163/2214-871X_ei1_SIM_3803. ISBN 978-90-04-08265-6.

al-Qahir Abbasid dynasty Born: 899 Died: 950
Sunni Islam titles
Preceded by al-Muqtadir	Abbasid Caliph; March 929	Succeeded by al-Muqtadir
Preceded by al-Muqtadir	Abbasid Caliph; 31 October 932 – 24 April 934	Succeeded by al-Radi
