= Al-Muttaqi =

Abbasid Caliph in Baghdad (r. 940–944)

al-Muttaqi المتقي
- Caliph; Commander of the Faithful
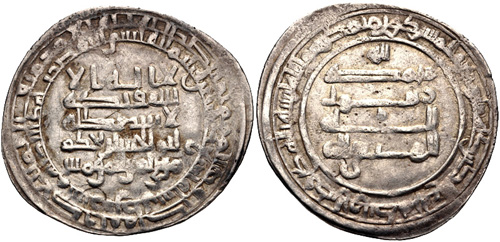
- Silver dirham of al-Muttaqi, including the names of both the Caliph and amir al-umara Bajkam

21st Caliph of the Abbasid Caliphate Abbasid Caliph in Baghdad
- Reign: 15 December 940 – 26 August 944
- Predecessor: al-Radi
- Successor: al-Mustakfi
- Born: c. 908; Baghdad, Abbasid Caliphate
- Died: July 968 (aged 60); Abbasid Caliphate
- Consort: Umm Ishaq
- Issue: Ishaq
Names
- Abu Ishaq Ibrahim ibn Jaʿfar al-Muqtadir al-Muttaqi
- Dynasty: Abbasid
- Father: al-Muqtadir
- Mother: Khalub Zahrah
- Religion: Sunni Islam

Abu Ishaq Ibrahim ibn Jaʿfar al-Muqtadir (Arabic: أبو إسحاق إبراهيم بن جعفر المقتدر) better known by his regnal title al-Muttaqi (908 – July 968, المتقي) was the Abbasid Caliph in Baghdad from 940 to 944. His reign marked the start of the 'later Abbasid period' (940–1258).

== Early life ==
Al-Muttaqi was the son of al-Muqtadir and his concubine named Khalub also known as Zuhra. She was a Greek, and was the mother of Ibrahim (the future Caliph al-Muttaqi). His full name was Ibrahim ibn Jaʿfar al-Muqtadir and his kunya Abu Ishaq. He had a striking appearance: blue eyes, red hair and a very pale clear complexion. A man of ascetic habits, he devoted himself to fasting and eschewed worldly pleasures like wine and love, famously asserting that his only desired companion was the Qur'an.

Of such little importance the Caliphate had become by now that when the previous Caliph al-Radi died, Bajkam, amir al-umara (Amir of Amirs), contented himself with despatching to Baghdad his secretary, who assembled the chief men to elect a successor. The choice fell on the deceased Caliph's brother al-Muttaqi, who assumed the office after it had been some days vacant; and whose first act was to send a banner and dress of honor to Bajkam, a needless confirmation of his rank.

Bajkam, before returning to Wasit, where he now held his court, went out on a hunting party, and met his death at the hands of a band of marauding Kurds. The Capital again became the scene of renewed anarchy.

== Reign ==
=== Reign and relations with Amir al-umara Bajkam ===
Among Al-Muttaqi's first actions as Caliph was the confirmation of Bajkam as amir al-umara. Despite al-Muttaqi's gesture of support, Bajkam still faced opposition among the regional autonomous provincial governors, including al-Baridi.

Bajkam opened a campaign against al-Baridi in early spring 941. His lieutenants were at first defeated by the Baridis, whereupon Bajkam himself left Wasit to take the field. On his way to join his army, however, he was informed that his generals had achieved a major victory over the Baridis, and decided to return to Wasit. On 21 April 941, while travelling, he took part in a hunting excursion, during which he and his party encountered a band of Kurdish brigands. During a brief skirmish, Bajkam was slain when one of the Kurds stabbed him in the back with his lance.

However Bajkam died within a year, Bajkam's unexpected death created a power vacuum in Baghdad, with disagreements between Daylamite and Turkish forces prompting the former to join the defeated al-Baridi. With their assistance, he marched on Wasit and Baghdad, capturing them, but was soon forced to flee due to the disorder that followed his usurpation of power. A Daylamite chief named Kurankij replaced him as de facto ruler of Baghdad, but he imposed tyrannical rule, and al-Muttaqi appealed to the former amir al-umara Ibn Ra'iq for assistance.

=== Reign and rivalry between his officials ===
With vizier Abu Abdallah al-Baridi gone, on 3 July Kurankij was appointed as amir al-umara by the powerless caliph al-Muttaqi. On the same night, the Turk Takinak was arrested and drowned. Kurankij chose Abu'l-Faraj ibn Abd al-Rahman al-Isfahani as his secretary (katib), and called on Ali ibn Isa ibn al-Jarrah and his brother Abd al-Rahman to become heads of the administration, but without the title of vizier. This arrangement did not last long, however: within a few days, the Banu'l-Jarrah brothers were dismissed, and Abu Ishaq Muhammad ibn Ahmad al-Qarariti appointed vizier. As al-Baridi had gathered new forces and come up from his base in Basra to Wasit, Kurankij sent his own troops under another Daylamite commander, Ispahan, to confront them. On the news of their approach, the Baridis abandoned Wasit and retreated to Basra.

In the meantime, a previous amir al-umara, Muhammad ibn Ra'iq, who had fled to Syria, was strengthened by an influx of Turkic commanders leaving Baghdad, and received a letter from al-Muttaqi inviting his return to the Abbasid capital. When Kurankij received news of Ibn Ra'iq's march on Baghdad, he recalled Ispahan from Wasit, which almost immediately was captured by the Baridis. On 22 August, he also dismissed the vizier al-Qarariti and replaced him with Abu Ja'far Muhammad ibn Qasim al-Karkhi.

As Ibn Ra'iq approached Baghdad, Kurankij exited the city and made for Ukbara. The two armies fought for several days, but Ibn Ra'iq was unable to secure victory. Nevertheless, on 23 August a detachment of Ibn Ra'iq's army under Ibn Muqatil entered Baghdad, followed two days later by the bulk of Ibn Ra'iq's army, with Kurankij following behind a day later. Kurankij and his men were reportedly contemptuous of their opponent, and Ibn Ra'iq himself is said to have contemplated returning to Syria. But in a fight that broke out in the city itself, some of Ibn Ra'iq's men managed to attack the Daylamites from behind. The Daylamites panicked and were routed, as they were also being attacked by the populace. Kurankij went into hiding, and Ibn Ra'iq's ascendancy was secured. On 22 September, Ibn Ra'iq had the surviving Daylamites executed, and on the next day, he was raised to amir al-umara. Kurankij was discovered and imprisoned in the palace.

Abu Abdallah alBaridi used this to take Wasit from Kurankij's forces and initiated peaceful relations with Ibn Ra'iq. This broke down two months later, and Ibn Ra'iq began to advance on alBaridi, until a mutiny by Tuzun forced him to reconcile with alBaridi, even elevating him to the Vizierate for the 4th time. However, alBaridi wanted to come in person to Baghdad, which resulted in Ibn Ra'iq dismissing him from the Vizierate. In response alBaridi sent an army to capture Baghdad.

Near the Diyala river on 7th March 942, Ibn Ra'iq was defeated, he and the Caliph fled for Hamdanid Mosul, while Abu Abdallah alBaridi's younger brother Abul Husayn took charge of Baghdad. For the next 4 months the city was devastated, much of it was in civil war between the various contingents of the army: Turks, Daylamites and Caramathian mercenaries, as well as the general populace. Famine and plague broke out by mid-year and many left the city.

Meanwhile in Mosul, al-Muttaqi was welcomed by the Hamdanid dynasty, who organized a campaign to restore him to the capital. However, their ends were purely selfish; they assassinated Ibn Ra'iq, and having added his Syrian government to their own, turned their ambition towards Baghdad. The Hamdanid chief, with the title of Nasir al-Dawla, advanced on Baghdad with the Caliph.

However, in less than a year, the Hamdanid chieftains had to return to Mosul; for a Turkish general called Tuzun entered Baghdad in triumph, and was saluted as amir al-umara. Initially Tuzun waged war against the Baridis over Wasit. But peace was more preferable to him, so he made an alliance with the Baridis, marrying Abu Abdallah's daughter. The Caliph saw such an alliance as a threat to his rule, and once more fled his capital northwards to the Hamdanids. Troops sent in response enabled him to escape; he fled to Mosul and after that to Nusaybin.

=== Reign and relations with Ibn Ra'iq ===
Bajkam remained amir al-umara until his death in April 941. Bajkam's unexpected death created a power vacuum in Baghdad, with disagreements between Daylamite and Turkish forces prompting the former to join the defeated al-Baridi, while many of the latter fled north to Mosul and thence came to join Ibn Ra'iq in Damascus. The Baridis briefly captured Baghdad, but a revolt of their soldiery drove them out, and the Daylamite chief named Kurankij became amir al-umara. Al-Muttaqi appealed to Ibn Ra'iq for assistance against Kurankij. Ibn Ra'iq marched on Baghdad and managed to sideline and imprison Kurankij. The Daylamites who had been his mainstay were massacred, and Ibn Ra'iq was re-appointed as amir al-umara on 23 September. He did not long enjoy it, however, as in early 942 he was assassinated at the orders of the Hamdanid prince Nasir al-Dawla, who soon succeeded him as amir al-umara.

=== Reign and relations with Tuzun ===
When Tuzun knew of the Turkic army revolt, the Baridis began to move against Wasit and sent an envoy to Tuzun urging him to march on Baghdad, and requesting the rights of tax-farming in Wasit. Tuzun gave a non-committal answer, but his spies soon informed him that Khajkhaj was planning to desert to the Baridis. On 20 May, Tuzun with his retainers surprised Khajkhaj in his bed, seized him and blinded him. Leaving 300 men under Kaighalagh to safeguard Wasit, Tuzun marched on Baghdad. There Sayf al-Dawla had promised the Caliph to resist, but on the Turks' approach, the Hamdanid and his officers fled north, and on 3 June, Tuzun entered the capital and was named amir al-umara by the Caliph.

Tuzun's first act was to march south against Wasit, which Kaighalagh had been forced to abandon in the face of Baridi superiority. On his way south he met with Muhammad ibn Shirzad, a defector from the Baridis, whom he appointed as his personal secretary. Tuzun pursued a peace with the Baridis, who now had to face an unexpected attack by Yusuf ibn Wajih, the ruler of Oman, on Basra itself. The deal was sealed with a marriage alliance between Tuzun and a daughter of Abu Abdallah al-Baridi. Back in Baghdad, however, the news of the peace between Tuzun and the Baridis was not welcomed: the vizier Abu'l-Husayn ibn Muqla distrusted both Tuzun and especially Ibn Shirzad. Fearing for his own position if he could not satisfy the financial demands of the Turks, he made contact with the Hamdanids. A Hamdanid army under Nasir al-Dawla's cousin Abu Abdallah al-Husayn appeared before the Harb Gate of Baghdad, and both the vizier and the Caliph went over to him and were escorted north to Mosul. Hearing about these events, Tuzun quickly granted al-Baridi the tax-farming of Wasit and returned to Baghdad with his troops.

Tuzun followed the Hamdanids north, heavily defeated Sayf al-Dawla in two battles near Tikrit, and captured Mosul. The Hamdanid brothers and the Caliph to abandon Mosul for Nisibis, from where the Caliph and his entourage, accompanied by Sayf al-Dawla, went to Raqqa. An agreement was concluded between Tuzun and the Hamdanids on 26 May 944, whereby Nasir al-Dawla renounced his claims on the Caliphate's core lands in central Iraq, receiving in return recognition for his control over the Jazira and his claims over Syria. The Hamdanid was also obliged to pay an annual tribute of 3.6 million dirhams.

Also Shortly after, peace being restored between Tuzun and the Hamdanid chiefs, al-Muttaqi had took his residence at Raqqa.

== Downfall and succession ==
While in Raqqa, In the meantime, Caliph al-Muttaqi, who resented the dominance of the various warlords and tried to recover the independence and authority of his office, had contacted the powerful and virtually full autonomous governor of Egypt, Muhammad ibn Tughj al-Ikhshid. In response, the Ikhshid launched a campaign across Syria and in August 944 met with the Caliph at Raqqa, where he tried to persuade al-Muttaqi to move to Egypt. Al-Muttaqi refused, and instead returned to Baghdad, trusting the assurances of Tuzun. As the Caliph approached the capital, however, Tuzun met him and had him blinded and deposed him. Al-Muttaqi had now received new oaths from Tuzun and his supporters that they would respect his authority were he return. Thus, the advice of the Ikhshid to at least stay at the safety of Raqqa went unheeded.

At the beginning of the year 333, he made his way down the Euphrates, until he met personally with Tuzun at Anbar on 11th October 944. He kneeled and kissed the ground before him, then declared his oath fulfilled. The Caliph was dragged off and blinded. The same day, Tuzun installed the ex-caliph's cousin as his successor, with the title of al-Mustakfi, "For whom the Lord suffices".

=== Assessment and legacy ===
Al-Muttaqi was raised to the throne by the amīr al-umarāʾ Bajkam. He tried to exploit the rivalries of the regional warlords to recover the independence and authority of his office, but his attempts failed, and he was deposed and blinded by the amīr al-umarāʾ Tuzun in September 944. For the 11th-century historian al-Khatib al-Baghdadi, this unprecedented deed signalled the final collapse of caliphal authority. In al-Muttaqi's stead, al-Mustakfi was raised to the throne, at the age of 41.

== Sources ==
- Amedroz, Henry F.; Margoliouth, David S., eds. (1921). The Eclipse of the 'Abbasid Caliphate. Original Chronicles of the Fourth Islamic Century, Vol. V: The concluding portion of The Experiences of Nations by Miskawaihi, Vol. II: Reigns of Muttaqi, Mustakfi, Muzi and Ta'i. Oxford: Basil Blackwell.
- Bowen, Harold (1928). The Life and Times of ʿAlí Ibn ʿÍsà, ‘The Good Vizier’. Cambridge: Cambridge University Press.
- This text is adapted from William Muir's public domain, The Caliphate: Its Rise, Decline, and Fall.
- Sourdel, Dominique (1971). "Ibn Rāʾiḳ". In Lewis, B.; Ménage, V. L.; Pellat, Ch. & Schacht, J. (eds.). The Encyclopaedia of Islam, Second Edition. Volume III: H–Iram. Leiden: E. J. Brill. p. 902. OCLC 495469525.
- Bosworth, C. E. (1993). "al-Mustakfī". In Bosworth, C. E.; van Donzel, E.; Heinrichs, W. P. & Pellat, Ch. (eds.). The Encyclopaedia of Islam, Second Edition. Volume VII: Mif–Naz. Leiden: E. J. Brill. pp. 723–724. doi:10.1163/1573-3912_islam_SIM_5621. ISBN 978-90-04-09419-2.
- Busse, Heribert (2004) [1969]. Chalif und Grosskönig - Die Buyiden im Irak (945-1055) [Caliph and Great King - The Buyids in Iraq (945-1055)] (in German). Würzburg: Ergon Verlag. ISBN 3-89913-005-7.
- Kennedy, Hugh (2004) [1986]. The Prophet and the Age of the Caliphates: The Islamic Near East from the 6th to the 11th Century (Second ed.). Harlow: Longman. ISBN 978-0-582-40525-7.
- Bacharach, Jere L. (2006). Islamic History through Coins: An Analysis and Catalogue of Tenth-Century Ikhshidid Coinage. Cairo: The American University in Cairo Press. ISBN 977-424-930-5.

al-Muttaqi Abbasid dynasty Born: 908 Died: July 968
Sunni Islam titles
Preceded by al-Radi	Caliph of the Abbasid Caliphate; 15 December 940 – 26 August 944	Succeeded by al-Mustakfi
