= Al-Mustakfi =

Abbasid caliph from 944 to 946

al-Mustakfī bi’llāh المستكفي بالله
- Commander of the Faithful
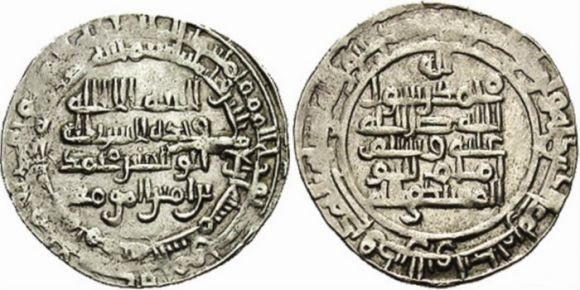
- Silver dirham of al-Mustakfi, 945

22nd Caliph of the Abbasid Caliphate
- Reign: September 944 – 29 January (or 9 March) 946
- Predecessor: al-Muttaqi
- Successor: al-Muti'
- Born: 11 November 908; Baghdad, Abbasid Caliphate
- Died: September 949; Baghdad, Buyid emirate of Iraq
- Issue: Muhammad ibn al-Mustakfi
- Abu’l-Qāsim ʿAbdallāh ibn ʿAlī ibn Aḥmad ibn Ṭalḥa ibn Jaʿfar ibn Muḥammad ibn Hārūn al-Mustakfī bi’llāh
- Dynasty: Abbasid
- Father: al-Muktafi
- Mother: Ghusn
- Religion: Sunni Islam

Abu al-Qasim Abd Allah ibn Ali (Note: Arabic: أبو القاسم عبد الله بن علي, romanized: ʾAbu al-Qāsim ʿAbd Allāh ibn ʿAlī) (11 November 908 – September/October 949), commonly known by his regnal name al-Mustakfi, (Note: Arabic: المستكفي بالله, romanized: al-Mustakfī bi’llāh, lit. 'Desirous of Being Satisfied with God Alone') was the Abbasid caliph in Baghdad from 944 to 946.

Al-Mustakfi was a younger son of Caliph al-Muktafi, and hence a rival to the line of Caliph al-Muqtadir that reigned in 908–944, a period during which the Abbasid Caliphate nearly collapsed, and caliphs became puppets at the hands of rival warlords. Al-Mustakfi himself was installed on the throne by Tuzun, a Turkish general who deposed and blinded the previous caliph, al-Muttaqi. In the power vacuum left after Tuzun's death in August 945, al-Mustakfi tried to regain some of his freedom of action, initiating anti-Shi'a measures, but the same vacuum allowed the Buyids to capture Baghdad. Al-Mustakfi was forced to recognize the Buyids as legitimate rulers and awarded them regnal titles, but was soon accused of plotting against them and deposed in January (or March) 946. He spent the final years of his life in prison. His son attempted to claim the caliphate in c. 968, but failed.

== Biography ==
=== Early life and character ===
Al-Mustakfi was born on 11 November 908, a son of Caliph al-Muktafi (r. 902–908) and a Greek concubine, Ghusn. He is described by the chroniclers as being fond of sports and games, partial to nabīdh (fermented drinks). He is said to have been sympathetic to the Shi'a, and maintained close contact with the ayyārūn (urban vagabonds and fighters) of Baghdad. His ties to the ayyārūn, and his participation in 'vulgar' games was an affront to the more pious sections of society.

=== Background: the decline of the Abbasid Caliphate ===
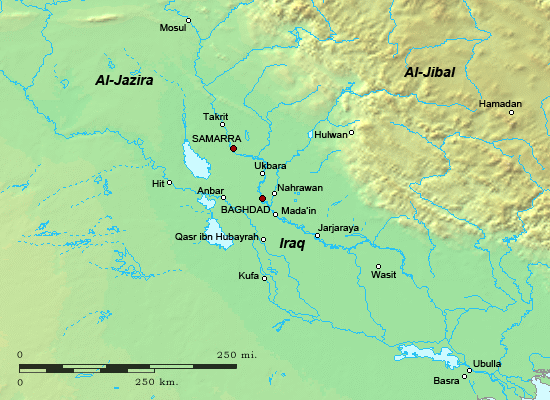
Map of Iraq in the 9th–10th centuries

By the 930s, the once mighty Abbasid Caliphate had fallen into decline: its outlying provinces lost to local dynasts, its finances in ruin, and warlords—the Hamdanids of Mosul, the Baridis of Basra, the Buyids of western Iran, as well as various military strongmen—competing for control of the very capital of the caliphate, Baghdad, and the title of amīr al-umarāʾ (commander-in-chief), which carried with it the de facto control over the Abbasid government. At the same time, the Abbasid dynasty itself was consumed by rivalries and infighting, chiefly between the descendants of al-Muktafi on the one hand and those of his brother and successor, al-Muqtadir (r. 908–932), on the other. Under al-Muqtadir's son al-Radi (r. 934–940), three of al-Muktafi's sons were executed or imprisoned, while the Caliph faced challenges from two of his own brothers and other collateral lines of Abbasid princes as well.

Al-Radi's brother, al-Muttaqi (r. 940–944), was raised to the throne by the amīr al-umarāʾ Bajkam. He tried to exploit the rivalries of the regional warlords to recover the independence and authority of his office, but his attempts failed, and he was deposed and blinded by the amīr al-umarāʾ Tuzun in September 944. For the 11th-century historian al-Khatib al-Baghdadi, this unprecedented deed signalled the final collapse of caliphal authority. In al-Muttaqi's stead, al-Mustakfi was raised to the throne, at the age of 41.

=== Al-Mustakfi's caliphate ===
Al-Mustakfi's accession meant the restoration of the line of al-Muktafi's line to the throne after 36 years, and from the start the new caliph made deliberate allusions to his father: the chosen regnal name deliberately echoed that of al-Muktafi, and he is said to have worn his father's ceremonial headdress (the qalansuwa) on his entry in Baghdad. This, and the quick appointment of his son, Abu'l-Hasan Muhammad, as heir-apparent, show that al-Mustakfi confidently intended to emulate his father's successful reign, but in reality, the new caliph was a puppet of the Turkic troops, facing an empty treasury, and with the resulting chaos and poverty threatening even Baghdad with famine. The only freedom for political manoeuvre remaining to the caliphs of this period was to choose which of the neighbouring warlords to ally with. For the warlords, the caliph was a source of legitimacy, and an astute caliph might be able rotate his support among the different warlords in the same way his predecessors had previously changed their viziers.

At the same time, al-Mustakfi persecuted potential rivals, in the person of al-Fadl, the chief of the remaining sons of al-Muqtadir and brother of the two previous caliphs, al-Muttaqi and al-Radi. Al-Mustakfi and al-Fadl were said to have hated each other already during their stay in the Tahirid Palace as young princes. When al-Mustakfi was enthroned, al-Fadl prudently went into hiding, and the vengeful al-Mustakfi had his house burned down. The new regime in Baghdad was threatened from the east and south by the Buyids, who had allied themselves with the Baridis of Basra. A Buyid attempt to capture Wasit in spring 944 failed, as did a thrust on Baghdad while Tuzun was preoccupied in the north in the summer 944. In spring 945, the Buyids managed to occupy Wasit, but after Tuzun concluded peace with the Hamdanids, they were forced to retreat.

Tuzun was able to fend off various challengers to retain control of Baghdad, but he died in August 945 and was replaced by his secretary Ibn Shirzad, who did not enjoy the same authority with the troops. Ibn Shirzad's weakness was quickly exploited by the Caliph, who assumed a new title, that of 'Rightful Imam' (Imam al-Haqq), to bolster his claim to Islamic leadership. He also took measures against Shi'a followers, imprisoning the Shi'a leader al-Shafi'i, and dismissed corrupt judges, including the chief qadi, Muhammad ibn Abi al-Shawarib.

Finding himself unable to control affairs, Ibn Shirzad requested the aid of the Hamdanid Nasir al-Dawla from Mosul. Just then the governor of Wasit surrendered to the Buyid leader Ahmad ibn Buya, and joined him in his march on Baghdad. Left leaderless, the Turkic troops of the capital made no preparations to resist. Ibn Shirzad and the Caliph went into hiding, emerging only when the Turks had left the city to join the Hamdanids. When a messenger of Ahmad ibn Buya arrived at the capital, al-Mustakfi pretended to be delighted at their arrival.

=== Downfall and death ===
The Buyid forces entered Baghdad without opposition, and on 21 December, al-Mustakfi was forced to recognize the Buyids' authority. Ahmad was granted the honorific title of Mu'izz al-Dawla ("Magnifier of the Dynasty"); similar titles were granted to his two brothers, Hasan (Rukn al-Dawla, "Pillar of the Dynasty") and Ali (Imad al-Dawla, "Prop of the Dynasty"). In accordance with the family-based Buyid system, the title of amīr al-umarāʾ passed not to Mu'izz al-Dawla, but to the oldest brother, Imad al-Dawla, who was the chief Buyid emir. As al-Mustakfi was now under Buyid control, the Hamdanids promptly stopped recognizing him as caliph, and proclaimed their allegiance to the former caliph al-Muttaqi.

Al-Mustakfi himself reportedly intrigued with some of the Buyids' Daylamite officers against Mu'izz al-Dawla. As a result, he was deposed on 29 January 946 (or 9 March, according to other accounts) on Mu'izz al-Dawla's orders. The reason given for al-Mustakfi's deposition was likely a mere pretext; historian Harold Bowen called the act a "political necessity" that also was highly symbolic, making clear where power now resided.

Although the Buyids and their followers were Shi'a sympathizers, Mu'izz al-Dawla preferred not to risk installing a Shi'a caliph (or recognizing the Isma'ili Fatimid caliphs), for fear of his men obeying the caliph rather than him. Instead, he raised al-Fadl, who emerged from hiding, to the caliphate with the name al-Muti. Lacking any real power, the new caliph was effectively a puppet ruler who granted the Buyid regime legitimacy. Following the conclusion of a peace agreement in summer 946, the Hamdanids acknowledged al-Muti as caliph, but in the east, the Samanids continued to recognize al-Mustakfi as caliph until 955.

Al-Mustakfi was also blinded, apparently as a revenge act initiated by al-Muti, and spent the rest of his life as a prisoner in the caliphal palace, where he died in September 949. Some attempts were made to reclaim the caliphate from al-Muti by members of al-Muktafi's line, but these were unsuccessful. One of al-Mustakfi's nephews, Abu'l-Nasr Ishaq, tried to raise a revolt in Adharbayjan in 960, taking the caliphal name al-Mustajir bi'llah ("Seeking Support in God"), but was defeated by the local Musafirid rulers. After the death of Mu'izz al-Dawla in 967, al-Mustakfi's son and designated heir, Abu'l-Hasan Muhammad, came to Iraq and managed to gather a considerable following by hiding his identity and claiming to be the Mahdi, but eventually he was discovered and captured. Although he managed to escape, his hopes of seizing the throne were never realized. This marked the end of the caliphal pretensions of the line of al-Mustakfi as well.

== Sources ==
- Bosworth, C. E. (1993). "al-Mustakfī". In Bosworth, C. E.; van Donzel, E.; Heinrichs, W. P. & Pellat, Ch. (eds.). The Encyclopaedia of Islam, Second Edition. Volume VII: Mif–Naz. Leiden: E. J. Brill. pp. 723–724. doi:10.1163/1573-3912_islam_SIM_5621. ISBN 978-90-04-09419-2.
- Bowen, Harold (1928). The Life and Times of ʿAlí Ibn ʿÍsà, ‘The Good Vizier’. Cambridge: Cambridge University Press.
- Busse, Heribert (2004) [1969]. Chalif und Grosskönig - Die Buyiden im Irak (945-1055) [Caliph and Great King - The Buyids in Iraq (945-1055)] (in German). Würzburg: Ergon Verlag. ISBN 3-89913-005-7.
- Donohue, John J. (2003). The Buwayhid Dynasty in Iraq 334 H./945 to 403 H./1012: Shaping Institutions for the Future. Leiden and Boston: Brill. ISBN 90-04-12860-3.
- Kennedy, Hugh (2004) [1986]. The Prophet and the Age of the Caliphates: The Islamic Near East from the 6th to the 11th Century (Second ed.). Harlow: Longman. ISBN 978-0-582-40525-7.
- Özaydin, Abdülkerim (2006). "Müstekfî-Bi̇llâh". TDV Encyclopedia of Islam, Vol. 32 (el-Münci̇d – Nasi̇h) (in Turkish). Istanbul: Presidency of Religious Affairs, Centre for Islamic Studies. pp. 139–140. ISBN 978-975-389-454-8.

al-Mustakfi Abbasid dynasty Born: 11 November 908 Died: September 949
Sunni Islam titles
Preceded by al-Muttaqi	Caliph of the Abbasid Caliphate; September 944 – 29 January/9 March 946	Succeeded by al-Muti'
