= Ibn Muqla =

Abbasid-era Persian vizier and father of Islamic calligraphy

- Born: 885 or 886; Baghdad, Abbasid Caliphate
- Died: 20 July 940; Baghdad, Abbasid Caliphate
- Occupations: Abbasid court official and vizier, master calligrapher
- Years active: 908–936
- Known for: Islamic calligraphy
- Style: Naskh, Thuluth, Tawqi, Muhaqqaq

Ibn Muqla (Arabic: ابن مقلة) was a polymath, calligrapher, vizier, and poet prominent in Baghdad during the Islamic Golden Age.

Born in 9th century Baghdad, Ibn Muqla systematized Arabic calligraphy through geometric and mathematical principles, revolutionizing the art form and beginning the classical Islamic calligraphic tradition. Rising to high state posts as a young man, his career culminated in his assumption of the senior ministerial title of the Abbasid Caliphate, the vizierate, thrice: in 928–930, 932–933 and 934–936. Unable to successfully challenge the growing power of regional emirs, he lost his position to the first amir al-umara, Ibn Ra'iq, and died in prison.

He is widely celebrated for inventing the Thuluth style of Islamic calligraphy along with five other styles–including Naskh, a smooth cursive style that replaced the older Kūfi style as the primary script for writing manuscripts of the Qur'an. His skill in the art of calligraphy was so great that his contemporaries are recorded to have attributed religious and prophetic attributes to his abilities, with one contemporary calling him a "prophet of calligraphy."

== Life ==
=== Early life and career ===
Ibn Muqla was born in Baghdad, the capital of the Abbasid Caliphate, in 885 or 886. His career in public service began when he served as tax collector. His rise to power in the central government came in 908, under the patronage of the powerful vizier Abu 'l-Hasan Ali ibn al-Furat, who appointed him in charge of official dispatches. It was at this time, under the ineffectual rule of Caliph al-Muqtadir (r. 908–932), that the civil bureaucracy reached its apex of power in the Abbasid court, but where the achievements of previous reigns in restoring the Caliphate's fortunes collapsed due to chronic financial shortages. Throughout the period, the political scene in Baghdad was dominated by Ibn al-Furat and his faction (the Banu'l-Furat), his rival Ali ibn Isa al-Jarrah and the faction gathered around him (the Banu'l-Jarrah), and the powerful chief of the military, Mu'nis al-Khadim. Despite his close ties to Ibn al-Furat, which were re-affirmed during the latter's second tenure in 917–918, Ibn Muqla eventually turned against him. His next promotion came during the de facto 918–928 vizierate of Ali ibn Isa, when he assumed the important department (diwan) of the public estates.

=== First vizierate ===
By cultivating the friendship of the powerful chamberlain (hadjib) Nasr, Ibn Muqla managed to secure the post of vizier for himself after Ali's disgrace in 928. His vizierate however was marked by extreme internal instability, including a short-lived coup in 929, instigated by Mu'nis, which deposed al-Muqtadir in favour of his brother al-Qahir. Despite the coup's failure, Mu'nis and his close ally Ali ibn Isa now dominated the government, and led to Ibn Muqla's dismissal in 930.

=== Second vizierate and the overthrow of al-Qahir ===
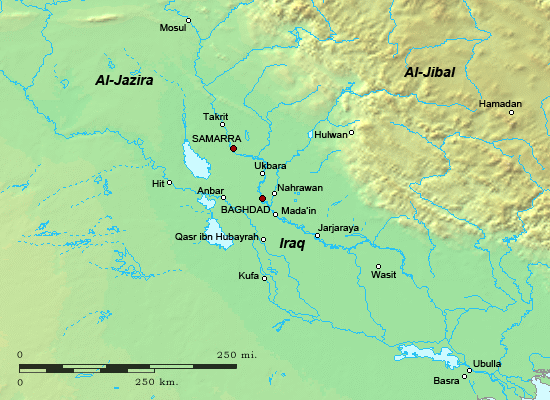
Map of Iraq in the 9th–10th centuries

Ibn Muqla was reappointed as vizier by al-Qahir when he succeeded al-Muqtadir after the latter's death in 932. The new caliph's attempts to assert his own authority met with opposition both from Ibn Muqla and from Mu'nis. Mu'nis started conspiring against al-Qahir, but he was arrested and killed before he could act, whereupon, after only six months in office, Ibn Muqla was dismissed. Ibn Muqla then headed another conspiracy, and in 934 al-Qahir was captured, blinded and deposed by the Baghdad troops, with his nephew al-Radi succeeding him.

=== Third vizierate and downfall ===
Initially, al-Radi sent for Ali ibn Isa to once more assume the vizierate, but the latter refused on account of his advanced age; Ibn Muqla was then appointed to his third term of office. However, for the first months of the reign, Muhammad ibn Yaqut continued to be the most powerful member of the court until his downfall in April 935; only then did Ibn Muqla truly gain control of the administration.

By this time, the greatest threat faced by the Caliphate was the increasing independence of the regional governors, who had taken advantage of the internal quarrels in the Abbasid court to strengthen their own control over their provinces and withheld the taxes due to Baghdad, leaving the central government crippled. Ibn Muqla resolved to reassert his control over the neighbouring provinces by military force, and chose the Hamdanid-controlled Jazira as his first target: in 935 he launched a campaign that took the Hamdanid capital, Mosul, but he was forced to return to Baghdad. Another attempt in 936 to launch a campaign against the rebellious governor of Wasit, Muhammad ibn Ra'iq, failed to even get started. Coupled with his failure to counter the mounting financial crisis, this last disaster led to Ibn Muqla's dismissal and arrest.

Ibn Muqla's dismissal marks also the final end of the independence of the Abbasid caliphs, for shortly after Ibn Ra'iq was appointed to the new post of amir al-umara ("commander of commanders"), a military-based office that became the de facto ruler of what remained of the Caliphate and deprived the caliph from all real authority. Ibn Ra'iq had the possessions of Ibn Muqla and his son confiscated, and Ibn Muqla in turn began to conspire against the amir al-umara. Ibn Ra'iq however became aware of this, and had him imprisoned and his right hand cut off. Shortly after, even while the army of the Turkish general Bajkam was approaching Baghdad to depose Ibn Ra'iq, his tongue was cut. Despite Bajkam's success, Ibn Muqla remained in prison, where he died on 20 July 940.

== Calligraphy ==
Ibn Muqla was also famous as a calligrapher and the inventor of the thuluth style. In addition to thuluth, he invented five other styles of calligraphy, including naskh, a smooth cursive script that eventually superseded kūfi as the primary script for transmitting the holy Koran. Naskh is an easy-to-read font and continues to be used in printing to the present era. Ibn Muqla was revered as 'a prophet in the field of handwriting; it was poured upon his hand, even as it was revealed to the bees to make their honey cells hexagonal'. He or his brothers have been considered the originators of the so-called al-khatt al-mansub ("proportioned script") style, perfected by the 11th-century calligrapher Ibn al-Bawwab. "Khatt" refers to the "marking out" of lines, which suggests that calligraphy is a demarcation of space. In the al-khatt al-mansub system letter design is related to three measurements: the size of nuqta; the height of the alif; and the circle with a diameter equal to the height of the alif.

None of Ibn Muqla's authentic work exists today, his work is only known through other sources like Ibn al-Nadim.

== See also ==
- Arabic calligraphy
- Islamic calligraphy

== Sources ==
- Ali, Wijdan (1999). The Arab Contribution to Islamic Art: From the Seventh to the Fifteenth Centuries. Cairo: American University in Cairo Press. ISBN 978-977-424-476-6.
- Grabar, Oleg (1992). The Mediation of Ornament. The A.W. Mellon Lectures in the Fine Arts. Vol. XXXV. Princeton, NJ: Princeton University Press.
- Kennedy, Hugh (2004) [1986]. The Prophet and the Age of the Caliphates: The Islamic Near East from the 6th to the 11th Century (Second ed.). Harlow: Longman. ISBN 978-0-582-40525-7.
- Osborn, J.R. (2009). "Narratives of Arabic Script: Calligraphic Design and Modern Spaces". Design and Culture. 1 (3): 289–306. doi:10.1080/17547075.2009.11643292. S2CID 147422407.
- Sourdel, Dominique (1971). "Ibn Muḳla". In Lewis, B.; Ménage, V. L.; Pellat, Ch. & Schacht, J. (eds.). The Encyclopaedia of Islam, Second Edition. Volume III: H–Iram. Leiden: E. J. Brill. pp. 886–887. OCLC 495469525.
- Tabbaa, Yasser (1991). "The Transformation of Arabic Writing: Part I, Qur'ānic Calligraphy". Ars Orientalis. 21: 119–148. ISSN 0571-1371. JSTOR 4629416.
- Zetterstéen, K. V. (1995). "al-Rāḍī bi'llāh". In Bosworth, C. E.; van Donzel, E.; Heinrichs, W. P. & Lecomte, G. (eds.). The Encyclopaedia of Islam, Second Edition. Volume VIII: Ned–Sam. Leiden: E. J. Brill. p. 368. ISBN 978-90-04-09834-3.
