= Al-Radi =

20th Abbasid Caliph (r. 934–940)

al-Radi bi'llah الراضي بالله
- Caliph; Commander of the Faithful
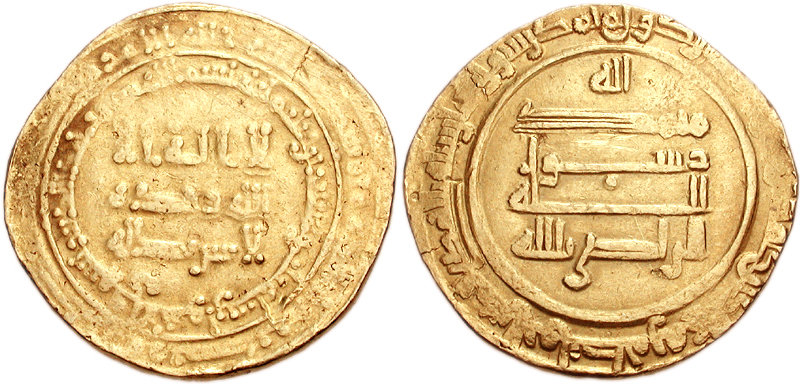
- Gold dinar of al-Radi, minted at al-Ahwaz in 934

20th Caliph of the Abbasid Caliphate
- Reign: 24 April 934 – 12 December 940
- Predecessor: al-Qahir
- Successor: al-Muttaqi
- Born: Muhammad ibn Ja'far al-Muqtadir; 1 January 909; Baghdad
- Died: 13 December 940 (aged 31); Baghdad
- Burial: al-Rusafa, Iraq
- Consort: Farha; Rabab
- Issue: al-Abbas
Names
- Abu'l-Abbas Muhammad ibn Ja'far al-Muqtadir al-Radi bi'llah
- Dynasty: Abbasid
- Father: al-Muqtadir
- Mother: Zalum
- Religion: Sunni Islam

Abu'l-Abbas Muhammad ibn Ja'far al-Muqtadir (Arabic: أبو العباس أحمد (محمد) بن جعفر المقتدر, romanized: Abū al-ʿAbbās Aḥmad (Muḥammad) ibn al-Muqtadir; 1 January 909 – 23 December 940), usually simply known by his regnal name al-Radi bi'llah (Arabic: الراضي بالله, romanized: al-Rāḍī bi'llāh, lit. 'Content with God'), was the twentieth Caliph of the Abbasid Caliphate, reigning from 934 to his death. He died on 23 December 940 at the age of 31. His reign marked the end of the caliph's political power and the rise of military strongmen, who competed for the title of amir al-umara.

== Early life ==
The future al-Radi was born on 20 December 909, to the caliph al-Muqtadir (r. 908–932) and a Greek-born slave concubine named Zalum. At the age of four, he received the nominal governorship of Egypt and the Maghreb, and was sent with the commander-in-chief Mu'nis al-Muzaffar to Egypt, who became his tutor.

When Mu'nis and al-Muqtadir fell out in 927, Abu'l-Abbas and the vizier Ibn Muqla tried to mediate between his father and the powerful commander-in-chief, but to no avail. In 930, Abu'l-Abbas received the governorship over Syria from his father, although he remained in Baghdad, residing in his palace in the Muharrim quarter of the city. In the next year, rumours circulated that Mu'nis intended to abduct Abu'l-Abbas, take him to Syria, and declare him caliph there. This alarmed al-Muqtadir, who had his son brought to reside with him in the caliphal palace.

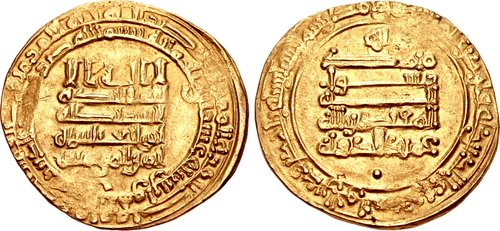
Gold dinar of Caliph al-Muqtadir (his father) with the name of his heir Abu'l-Abbas (al-Radi)

When his father was killed in 932, Abu'l-Abbas was proposed as a successor, but eventually his uncle al-Qahir (r. 932–934) was chosen. Abu'l-Abbas was imprisoned as a dangerous rival, and his properties confiscated. He remained confined until the deposition of al-Qahir, when he was freed and raised to the throne (24 April 934).

== Caliphate ==
The contemporary historian al-Masudi describes him as pleasing in appearance, using scents in large amounts, and of a generous nature, being notable for the lavish gifts he gave his courtiers. According to al-Masudi, the caliph "enjoyed talking of the men and things of the past and sought out scholars and men of letters and frequently summoned them to his presence and lavished marks of his liberality upon them". Unlike the forceful al-Qahir, he quickly became a figurehead ruler, while ambitious men seized authority in the state.

After the distinguished former vizier Ali ibn Isa al-Jarrah declined to be reappointed to the office on account of his advanced age, Ibn Muqla, who had led the conspiracy against al-Qahir, received the post. However, for the first months of the reign, Muhammad ibn Yaqut continued to be the most powerful member of the court until his downfall in April 935; only then did Ibn Muqla truly gain control of the administration. In 935, the government was forced to take measures to confront the turmoil in Baghdad because of the behaviour of some Hanbali fanatics. Supported by popular sentiment, they accosted people in the streets, forced their way into private dwellings, emptied vessels of wine wherever found, broke musical instruments and mistreated female singers, pried into the details of trade, beat up their Ash'ari rivals, and generally acted in an arbitrary manner against anyone who transgressed against their strict interpretation of Islamic law and custom.

By this time, the greatest threat faced by the Caliphate was the increasing independence of the regional governors, who had taken advantage of the internal quarrels in the Abbasid court to strengthen their own control over their provinces and withheld the taxes due to Baghdad, leaving the central government crippled. Ibn Muqla resolved to reassert his control over the neighbouring provinces by military force, and chose the Hamdanid-controlled Jazira as his first target: in 935 he launched a campaign that took the Hamdanid capital, Mosul, but he was forced to return to Baghdad. Another attempt in 936 to launch a campaign against the rebellious governor of Wasit, Muhammad ibn Ra'iq, failed to even get started. Coupled with his failure to counter the mounting financial crisis, this last disaster led to Ibn Muqla's downfall. In April 936, Ibn Muqla was arrested by Muhammad ibn Yaqut's brother, al-Muzaffar, who forced al-Radi to dismiss him as vizier.

Ibn Muqla's dismissal marked the end of the independence of the Abbasid caliphs, for, shortly thereafter, al-Radi appointed Ibn Ra'iq to the new post of amir al-umara ("commander of commanders"), a military office that became the de facto ruler of what remained of the Caliphate. The caliph retained only control of Baghdad and its immediate environs, while all government affairs passed into the hands of Ibn Ra'iq and his secretary. The name of the amir al-umara was even commemorated in the khutba of the Friday prayer, alongside that of the caliph.

Al-Radi is commonly spoken of as the last of the real Caliphs: the last to deliver orations at the Friday service, to hold assemblies with philosophers to discuss the questions of the day, or to take counsel on the affairs of State; the last to distribute largess among the needy, or to interpose to temper the severity of cruel officers.

Away from home, change was afoot: the rich East was gone, Berber Africa and Egypt also, along with the greater part of Syria and Mesopotamia; Mosul was independent; peninsular Arabia was held by Carmathians and native chieftains; even Basra and Wasit rose in revolt. The advance of the 'Greeks' (Byzantine Empire) was stayed only by the brave Hamdanid prince who was deservedly styled Sayf al-Daula 'Sword of the Nation'.

== See also ==
- Abu Bakr bin Yahya al-Suli

== Sources ==
- Bonner, Michael (2010). "The waning of empire, 861–945". In Robinson, Chase F. (ed.). The New Cambridge History of Islam, Volume 1: The Formation of the Islamic World, Sixth to Eleventh Centuries. Cambridge: Cambridge University Press. pp. 305–359. ISBN 978-0-521-83823-8.
- Bowen, Harold (1928). The Life and Times of ʿAlí Ibn ʿÍsà: The Good Vizier. Cambridge: Cambridge University Press. OCLC 386849.
- Kennedy, Hugh (2004) [1986]. The Prophet and the Age of the Caliphates: The Islamic Near East from the 6th to the 11th Century (Second ed.). Harlow: Longman. ISBN 978-0-582-40525-7.
- Masudi (2010) [1989]. The Meadows of Gold: The Abbasids. Translated by Paul Lunde and Caroline Stone. London and New York: Routledge. ISBN 978-0-7103-0246-5.
- Özaydın, Abdülkerim (2007). "Râzî-Billâh". TDV Encyclopedia of Islam, Vol. 34 (Osmanpazari – Resuldar) (in Turkish). Istanbul: Presidency of Religious Affairs, Centre for Islamic Studies. pp. 489–490. ISBN 978-975-389-456-2.
- Zetterstéen, K. V. (1995). "al-Rāḍī bi'llāh". In Bosworth, C. E.; van Donzel, E.; Heinrichs, W. P. & Lecomte, G. (eds.). The Encyclopaedia of Islam, Second Edition. Volume VIII: Ned–Sam. Leiden: E. J. Brill. p. 368. doi:10.1163/1573-3912_islam_SIM_6170. ISBN 978-90-04-09834-3.
- This text is adapted from William Muir's public domain, The Caliphate: Its Rise, Decline, and Fall.

al-Radi Abbasid dynasty Born: 907 Died: 23 December 940
Sunni Islam titles
Preceded by al-Qahir	Caliph of the Abbasid Caliphate; 24 April 934 – 12 December 940	Succeeded by al-Muttaqi
