= Al-Fadl ibn Ja'far ibn al-Furat =

10th-century vizier of the Abbasid Caliphate

Abu'l-Fath al-Fadl ibn Ja'far ibn al-Furat (Arabic: أبو الفتح الفضل بن جعفر بن الفرات) (died 938), also called with the matronymic Ibn Hinzaba, was a member of the bureaucratic Banu'l-Furat family from Iraq, who served twice as vizier of the Abbasid Caliphate.

== Family ==
Abu'l-Fath al-Fadl ibn Ja'far ibn al-Furat was the scion of a bureaucratic dynasty, the Banu'l-Furat, that had occupied senior posts in the fiscal bureaucracy of the Abbasid Caliphate at Baghdad since the reign of Caliph al-Mu'tadid (r. 892–902) and had gone on to become one of the two major factions within the Abbasid administrative elite in the first decades of the 10th century. Fadl's father, Abu'l-Khattab Ja'far, was head of the land department for the East and West from 908 until his death in 909/10, while his uncle was the famous Abu'l-Hasan Ali, who served three times as vizier to Caliph al-Muqtadir.

Fadl was often called "Ibn Hinzaba" after his mother. From this the branch of the family he founded is usually called "Banu Hinzaba".

== Early career ==
Fadl replaced his father as head of the land department for the East (dīwān al-mashriq), holding the post until 911/2. He was appointed as deputy head of the same department during the first vizierate of Ali ibn Isa ibn al-Jarrah, who would emerge as his uncle's greatest opponent and the leader of the rival Banu'l-Jarrah faction. In 917–918, when his uncle was vizier for a second time, Fadl was again head of the department.

Abu'l-Hasan Ali ibn al-Furat and his son al-Muhassin were executed in 924 as a result of the unrestrained persecution of their political rivals, after which Fadl became the most senior member of his family. For a few years, he had to hide, as the reputation of the Banu'l-Furat had been tainted by bloodshed. It was Ibn al-Jarrah who brought Fadl back into government as head of the land department for the East in 927. When Ibn al-Jarrah was disgraced following the Qarmatian invasion of 927, Fadl was one of the chief candidates to succeed him, along with Ibn Muqla and al-Nayramani. However, as he was too identified with the Banu'l-Furat faction, Ibn Muqla became vizier. Fadl kept his previous post during Ibn Muqla's vizierate.

In 931, the support of the commander-in-chief Mu'nis al-Muzaffar—another formerly staunch opponent of his uncle—secured for him the land department of the Sawad, before returning to the land department of the East in 931–932 under the vizier al-Husayn ibn al-Qasim, who employed several ministers from the faction of Abu'l-Khattab Ja'far.

== First vizierate ==
Eventually Fadl himself was appointed vizier in May 932, after the previous incumbent al-Husayn ibn al-Qasim, had been deposed due to his inability to manage the dismal finances. Fadl himself had been instrumental in disclosing that Ibn al-Qasim had only managed to balance the budget with revenue that was no longer available, thus precipitating his downfall. With the support of al-Muqtadir's influential cousin, Harun ibn Gharib, he now became vizier. His tenure lasted only for a few months, being plagued by multiple problems. The Byzantine attacks on the frontier districts continued, as did the attacks of Mardavij in Persia. The refugees fleeing both often rioted in Baghdad, and even attacked the vizier in his own residence; Fadl only escaped death by leaping into his barge and rowing away. At the same time, Upper Mesopotamia was in the hands of Mu'nis al-Muzaffar, now hostile to the Caliph, while much of southern Iraq was being controlled or raided by the Qarmatians. Food became scarce in Baghdad, and the resulting famine led to an outbreak of plague in the city.

Harun ibn Gharib and Fadl encouraged al-Muqtadir to reconcile with Mu'nis al-Muzaffar, and invite the latter back to Baghdad, against the counsel of Muhammad ibn Yaqut and the sons of Ra'iq, who remained utterly opposed to Mu'nis. The Caliph hesitate between the two opinions, but finally listened to the latter. When Mu'nis marched on Baghdad, the Caliph rode out to confront him and was killed in the ensuing battle. Mu'nis thus emerged as the undisputed king-maker and dictator of the Caliphate. A new caliph, al-Qahir, was installed, and Ibn Muqla became vizier.

== Second vizierate, retirement and death ==
It was not until the caliphate of al-Radi (r. 934–940) that Fadl again occupied high office, being appointed inspector of Egypt and Syria. In that capacity, he confirmed Muhammad ibn Tughj al-Ikhshid's rule over Egypt. In 937 (AH 325), the amir al-umara Ibn Ra'iq appointed him again to the vizierate, and married his daughter to Fadl's son Ja'far. He retired later in the same year (AH 326), and retired to Egypt. He died in 938, and was buried at Ramla.

His son Ja'far became vizier of the Ikhshidid dynasty of Egypt, remaining in office from 946 until the Fatimid conquest of Egypt in 969. He was also a prominent traditionalist and transmitter of hadith.

== Sources ==
- van Berkel, Maaike (2013). "The Vizier". Crisis and Continuity at the Abbasid Court: Formal and Informal Politics in the Caliphate of al-Muqtadir (295-320/908-32). Leiden: Brill. pp. 65–86. ISBN 978-90-04-25271-4.
- Bonner, Michael (2010). "The waning of empire, 861–945". In Robinson, Chase F. (ed.). The New Cambridge History of Islam, Volume 1: The Formation of the Islamic World, Sixth to Eleventh Centuries. Cambridge: Cambridge University Press. pp. 305–359. ISBN 978-0-521-83823-8.
- Bowen, Harold (1928). The Life and Times of ʿAlí Ibn ʿÍsà, ‘The Good Vizier’. Cambridge: Cambridge University Press. OCLC 982525160.
- Bowen, H. (1993). "Muʾnis al-Muẓaffar". In Bosworth, C. E.; van Donzel, E.; Heinrichs, W. P. & Pellat, Ch. (eds.). The Encyclopaedia of Islam, Second Edition. Volume VII: Mif–Naz. Leiden: E. J. Brill. p. 575. doi:10.1163/1573-3912_islam_SIM_5520. ISBN 978-90-04-09419-2.
- Donohue, John J. (2003). The Buwayhid Dynasty in Iraq 334 H./945 to 403 H./1012: Shaping Institutions for the Future. Leiden and Boston: Brill. ISBN 90-04-12860-3.
- Sourdel, D. (1971). "Ibn al-Furāt". In Lewis, B.; Ménage, V. L.; Pellat, Ch. & Schacht, J. (eds.). The Encyclopaedia of Islam, Second Edition. Volume III: H–Iram. Leiden: E. J. Brill. pp. 767–768. doi:10.1163/1573-3912_islam_COM_0322. OCLC 495469525.

| Preceded by al-Husayn ibn al-Qasim | Vizier of the Abbasid Caliphate; 932 | Succeeded by Ibn Muqla |
| Preceded by | Vizier of the Abbasid Caliphate; 937 | Succeeded by |
