= Al-Badisi =

In Arabic onomastics ("nisbah"), al-Badisi denotes a relationship to or from the town of Badis. It may refer to:

- Abd al-Haqq al-Badisi (died after 1322), Moroccan biographer
- Muhammad ibn al-Qasim al-Badisi (died 1922), Moroccan astronomer, poet and writer
- Abu Yaqub Yusuf al-Zuhayli al-Badisi (died 1333), 14th century Moroccan saint and savant
