= Al-Abbas ibn al-Hasan al-Jarjara'i =

Senior Abbasid official and vizier from 904 to 908

Al-ʿAbbās ibn al-Ḥasan al-Jarjarāʾī (Arabic: العباس بن الحسن بن أيوب الجرجرائي) was a senior Abbasid official and vizier from October 904 until his murder on 16 December 908.

As his nisba shows, he came from the locality of Jarjaraya, south of Baghdad. He began his career as private secretary to the Abbasid vizier al-Qasim ibn Ubayd Allah. When al-Qasim died in October 904, he recommended either Abbas or the Jarrahid Ali ibn Isa as his successor; when the latter declined, Caliph al-Muktafi (reigned 902–908) duly appointed Abbas to the post. His tenure of office was marked by a close alliance with the Banu'l-Furat, whose leader Abu'l-Hasan Ali became his chief aide and designated successor.

When al-Muktafi died in 908, it fell to Abbas and the senior bureaucrats to decide on his successor. In the end, Abbas heeded the advice of Abu'l-Hasan Ali, who counselled the selection of a weak ruler who would be easy to manipulate: al-Muktafi's 13-year-old brother Ja'far, who became Caliph al-Muqtadir (r. 908–932). In December 908, a palace revolt broke out led by the Jarrahids and the Hamdanid al-Husayn ibn Hamdan, aiming to install his more mature and experienced uncle, Abdallah ibn al-Mu'tazz, in his stead. The revolt ultimately failed, but not before the rebels managed to kill Abbas.

== Sources ==
- Kennedy, Hugh (2004) [1986]. The Prophet and the Age of the Caliphates: The Islamic Near East from the 6th to the 11th Century (Second ed.). Harlow: Longman. ISBN 978-0-582-40525-7.
- Rosenthal, Franz, ed. (1985). The History of al-Ṭabarī, Volume XXXVIII: The Return of the Caliphate to Baghdad: The Caliphates of al-Muʿtaḍid, al-Muktafī and al-Muqtadir, A.D. 892–915/A.H. 279–302. SUNY Series in Near Eastern Studies. Albany, New York: State University of New York Press. ISBN 978-0-87395-876-9.
- Sourdel, Dominique (1965). "al-D̲j̲ard̲j̲arāʾī". In Lewis, B.; Pellat, Ch. & Schacht, J. (eds.). The Encyclopaedia of Islam, Second Edition. Volume II: C–G. Leiden: E. J. Brill. pp. 461–462. OCLC 495469475.
- van Berkel, Maaike; El Cheikh, Nadia Maria; Kennedy, Hugh; Osti, Letizia (2013). Crisis and Continuity at the Abbasid Court: Formal and Informal Politics in the Caliphate of al-Muqtadir (295-320/908-32). Leiden: BRILL. ISBN 978-90-04-25271-4.

Preceded by al-Qasim ibn Ubayd Allah	Vizier of the Abbasid Caliphate; October 904 – 16 December 908	Succeeded by Abu'l-Hasan Ali ibn al-Furat
