= Al-Qasim (disambiguation) =

Al-Qasim or Al-Qassim may refer to:

- Al-Qassim Province, Saudi Arabia
- Al-Qasim, Iraq
- Al-Qasim (name)

== See also ==
- Abu al-Qasim, "father of Al-Quasim"
- Ibn al-Qasim, "son of Al-Quasim"
