= Ibn al-Banna' al-Marrakushi =

Moroccan mathematician and astronomer

Ibn al‐Bannāʾ al‐Marrākushī
- Born: 29 or 30 December 1256; Marrakesh, Almohad Caliphate
- Died: 31 July 1321; Marrakesh, Marinid Sultanate

Academic background
- Influences: Al-Zarqali, Ibn Ishaq al-Tunisi

Academic work
- Era: Islamic Golden Age
- Main interests: Mathematics, astronomy

Ibn al‐Bannāʾ al‐Marrākushī (Arabic: ابن البناء المراكشي), full name: Abu'l-Abbas Ahmad ibn Muhammad ibn Uthman al-Azdi al-Marrakushi (Arabic: أبو العباس أحمد بن محمد بن عثمان الأزدي) (29 December 1256 – 31 July 1321), was a Moroccan Arab polymath who was active as a mathematician, astronomer, Islamic scholar, Sufi and astrologer.

== Biography ==
Ahmad ibn Muhammad ibn Uthman was born in the Qa'at Ibn Nahid Quarter of Marrakesh on 29 or 30 December 1256. His nisba al-Marrakushi is in relation to his birth and death in his hometown Marrakesh. His father was a mason thus the kunya Ibn al-Banna' (lit. the son of the mason).

Ibn al-Banna' studied a variety of subjects under at least 17 masters: Quran under the Qari's Muhammad ibn al-bashir and shaykh al-Ahdab. ʻilm al-ḥadīth under qadi al-Jama'a (chief judge) of Fez َAbu al-Hajjaj Yusuf ibn Ahmad ibn Hakam al-Tujibi, Abu Yusuf Ya'qub ibn Abd al-Rahman al-Jazuli and Abu abd allah ibn. Fiqh and Usul al-Fiqh under Abu Imran Musa ibn Abi Ali az-Zanati al-Marrakushi and Abu al-Hasan Muhammad ibn Abd al-Rahman al-Maghili who taugh him al-Juwayni's Kitab al-Irsahd. He also studied Arabic grammar under Abu Ishaq Ibrahim ibn Abd as-Salam as-Sanhaji and Muhammad ibn Ali ibn Yahya as-sharif al-marrakushi who also taugh him Euclid’s Elements. ʿArūḍ and ʿilm al-farāʾiḍ under Abu Bakr Muhammad ibn Idris ibn Malik al-Quda'i al-Qallusi. Arithmetic under Muhammad ibn Ali, known as Ibn Ḥajala. Ibn al-Banna' also studied astronomy under Abu 'Abdallah Muhammad ibn Makhluf as-Sijilmassi. He also studied medecine under al-Mirrīkh.

He is known to have attached himself to the founder of the Hazmiriyya zawiya and sufi saint of Aghmat, Abu Zayd Abd al-Rahman al-Hazmiri, who guided his arithmetic skills toward divinational predictions.

Ibn al-Banna' taught classes in Marrakesh and some of his students were: Abd al-Aziz ibn Ali al-Hawari al-Misrati (d.1344), Abd al-Rahman ibn Sulayman al-Laja'i (d. 1369) and Muhammad ibn Ali ibn Ibrahim al-Abli (d. 1356).

He died at Marrakesh on 31 July 1321.

== Works ==
Ibn al-Banna' wrote over 100 works encompassing such varied topics as Astronomy, Astrology, the division of inheritances, Linguistics, Logic, Mathematics, Meteorology, Rhetoric, Tafsir, Usūl al-Dīn and Usul al-Fiqh. One of his works, called Talkhīṣ ʿamal al-ḥisāb (Arabic: تلخيص أعمال الحساب) (Summary of arithmetical operations), includes topics such as fractions and sums of squares and cubes. Another, called Tanbīh al-Albāb, covers topics related to:

- calculations regarding the drop in irrigation canal levels,
- arithmetical explanation of the Muslim laws of inheritance
- determination of the hour of the Asr prayer,
- explanation of frauds linked to instruments of measurement,
- enumeration of delayed prayers which have to be said in a precise order, and
- calculation of legal tax in the case of a delayed payment

He also wrote an introduction to Euclid's Elements.

He also wrote Rafʿ al-Ḥijāb 'an Wujuh A'mal al-Hisab (Lifting the Veil from Faces of the Workings of Calculations) which covered topics such as computing square roots of a number and the theory of simple continued fractions.

== See also ==
- Ibn Ghazi al-Miknasi

== Sources ==
- Calvo, Emilia (2008). "Ibn al-Banna'". In Selin, Helaine (ed.). Encyclopaedia of the History of Science, Technology, and Medicine in Non-Western Cultures (2nd ed.). Springer Science & Business Media. ISBN 978-1-4020-4559-2.
- Cherkaoui, Ahmed Iqbal (1992). "Ibn al-Banna', Ahmad ibn Muhammad ibn Uthman". In Toufiq, Ahmed; Hajji, Mohamed (eds.). Ma'lamat al-Maghrib (in Arabic). Vol. 5. al-Jamī‘a al-Maghribiyya li-l-Ta’līf wa-l-Tarjama wa-l-Nashr.
- Oaks, Jeffrey (2017). "Ibn al- Bannāʾ al- Marrākushī". In Fleet, Kate; Krämer, Gudrun; Matringe, Denis; Nawas, John; Rowson, Everett (eds.). Encyclopaedia of Islam (3rd ed.). E. J. Brill.
- Samsó, Julio (2007). "Ibn al-Bannāʾ: Abū al-ʿAbbās Aḥmad ibn Muḥammad ibn ʿUthmān al-Azdī al-Marrākushī". In Thomas Hockey; et al. (eds.). The Biographical Encyclopedia of Astronomers. New York: Springer. pp. 551–552. ISBN 978-0-387-31022-0.
- Sarton, George (1931). Introduction to the History of Science. Vol. II. From Rabbi Ben Ezra to Roger Bacon. Carnegie Institution of Washington.
- Stearns, Justin (2012). Akyeampong, Emmanuel Kwaku; Gates Jr., Henry Louis (eds.). Dictionary of African Biography. Vol. 4. OUP USA. ISBN 978-0-19-538207-5.
- Suter, H.; Bencheneb, M. (1986) [1971]. "Ibn al- Bannāʾ al- Marrākus̲h̲ī". In Lewis, B.; Ménage, V. L.; Pellat, C.; Schacht, J. (eds.). Encyclopaedia of Islam. Vol. III (2nd ed.). Leiden, Netherlands: E. J. BRILL. ISBN 9004081186.
