= Ibn Makhlad =

Ibn Makhlad can refer to:

- al-Hasan ibn Makhlad al-Jarrah (died 882), Abbasid vizier
- Baqi ibn Makhlad (died 889), Spanish scholar of Qur'an and Hadith
- Sa'id ibn Makhlad (died 889), Abbasid vizier
- Sulayman ibn al-Hasan ibn Makhlad (fl. 930–940), Abbasid vizier
