= Sulayman ibn Wahb =

Abbasid official and Vizier

Sulayman ibn Wahb سليمان بن وهب

Secretary of Caliph al-Ma'mun
- In office 830s–831/832

Secretary of General Musa and Aytakh
- In office 843 – 847 (under Caliph al-Wathiq)

Supervisor of Finances in Egypt
- In office Under al-Mutawakkil he served twice as ʿamil – (supervisor of finances) in Egypt
- Monarch: Al-Mutawakkil

Abbasid vizier
- In office 870 – 21 June 870
- Monarch: Al-Muhtadi
- In office 877–878
- Monarch: Al-Mu'tamid

Personal details
- Born: Abbasid Caliphate
- Died: July/August c. 885 Baghdad, Abbasid Caliphate (now Iraq)
- Cause of death: Died in Prison of Baghdad
- Children: Ayyub, Ubayd Allah
- Parent: Wahb (father)

Abu Ayyub Sulayman ibn Wahb (Arabic: أبو أيوب سليمان بن وهب) (died July/August 885) was a senior official of the Abbasid Caliphate who served several times as vizier.

His family, the Banu Wahb, were originally Nestorian Christians from Wasit, and had produced secretaries in the caliphal administration since late Umayyad times. Sulayman first appears as a secretary to Caliph al-Ma'mun (r. 813–833). Under al-Wathiq (r. 842–847), he forged ties with the powerful Turkish military, serving as secretary to the Turkish generals Musa ibn Bugha and Aytakh. Under al-Mutawakkil (r. 847–861) he served twice as ʿamil (supervisor of finances) in Egypt, during which time he reportedly made a fortune.

As a senior court official, he distinguished himself as the patron of notable poets like Abu Tammam and al-Buhturi. He was first appointed as vizier—by then an almost powerless office due to the internal turmoil and increasing domination of the Turkish military—towards the end of the reign of al-Muhtadi (r. 869–870), and then again in 877 and 878 under al-Mu'tamid (r. 870–892), alternating with his rival al-Hasan ibn Makhlad al-Jarrah. His inability to counter the mounting financial crisis led to his permanent dismissal and imprisonment, dying in prison in May/June 885.

Sulayman was the founder of a veritable administrative dynasty: his son Ubayd Allah, grandson al-Qasim, and great-grandsons al-Husayn and Muhammad all became viziers.

== Sources ==
- Bosworth, C.E. (2002). "Wahb". In Bearman, P. J.; Bianquis, Th.; Bosworth, C. E.; van Donzel, E. & Heinrichs, W. P. (eds.). The Encyclopaedia of Islam, Second Edition. Volume XI: W–Z. Leiden: E. J. Brill. pp. 33–34. ISBN 978-90-04-12756-2.
