= Ubayd Allah ibn Sulayman =

Abbasid vizier and Official (891–901)

Ubayd Allah ibn Sulayman عبيدالله بن سليمان
- Born: 840; Abbasid Caliphate
- Died: April 901; Baghdad, Abbasid Caliphate
- Other names: Ibn Sulayman; Abu al-Qasim
- Occupation(s): Abbasid vizier and official
- Years active: June 891 – April 901 (under al-Mu'tamid and al-Mu'tadid)
- Children: Al-Qasim ibn Ubayd Allah
- Father: Sulayman ibn Wahb

Ubayd Allah ibn Sulayman (Arabic: عبيدالله بن سليمان) born in 840, was a senior official of the Abbasid Caliphate who served as vizier for ten years, from June 891 until his own death in April 901.

Hailing from the Banu Wahb, a family of Nestorian Christian origin that had served in the caliphal bureaucracy since late Umayyad times, Ubayd Allah was the son of Sulayman ibn Wahb, who had held the vizierate himself three times. Ubayd Allah followed the family tradition and entered the administration as a secretary, but when Sulayman fell in disgrace by regent al-Muwaffaq in 878, Ubayd Allah was also dismissed. His fortunes rose again through the support of al-Muwaffaq's son and future caliph al-Mu'tadid (r. 892–902), who appointed Ubayd Allah as vizier to the Caliph al-Mu'tamid (r. 870–892) after al-Muwaffaq's death in June 891. Ubayd Allah distinguished himself for his ability, honesty and justice, and continued to serve in the post throughout most of al-Mu'tadid's own reign, until his death in April 901.

Ubayd Allah's son al-Qasim succeeded him as vizier, and his grandsons al-Husayn and Muhammad also rose to become viziers.

== Sources ==
- Bosworth, C.E. (2002). "Wahb". In Bearman, P. J.; Bianquis, Th.; Bosworth, C. E.; van Donzel, E. & Heinrichs, W. P. (eds.). The Encyclopaedia of Islam, Second Edition. Volume XI: W–Z. Leiden: E. J. Brill. pp. 33–34. ISBN 978-90-04-12756-2.

Preceded by Isma'il ibn Bulbul	Vizier of the Abbasid Caliphate; June 891 – April 901	Succeeded by Al-Qasim ibn Ubayd Allah
