= Mu'nis al-Muzaffar =

Abbasid army commander (845/6–933)

Mu'nis al-Muzaffar مؤنس المظفر
- Native name: Abu'l-Hasan Mu'nis al-Qushuri أبو الحسن مؤنس القشوري
- Born: c. 845/6; Abbasid Empire
- Died: c. 933 Baghdad, Abbasid Empire (present-day Iraq)
- Allegiance: Abbasid Empire
- Branch: Abbasid army
- Service years: c. 880/1 – 933
- Conflicts: Zanj Rebellion; Arab–Byzantine wars; Wars with the Qarmatians; First Fatimid invasion of Egypt; Second Fatimid invasion of Egypt; Revolt of Yusuf ibn Abi'l-Saj

Abū'l-Ḥasan Mu'nis al-Qushuri (Arabic: أبو الحسن مؤنس القشوري; 845/6—933), also commonly known by the surnames al-Muẓaffar (المظفر; lit. 'the Victorious') and al-Khadim (ﺍﻟﺨﺎﺩﻡ; 'the Eunuch'), was the commander-in-chief of the Abbasid army from 908 to his death in 933, and virtual dictator and king-maker of the Caliphate from 928 on.

A Byzantine Greek eunuch slave, he entered military service under the future caliph al-Mu'tadid in the 880s. He rose to high rank before his abrupt disgrace, likely the result of his participation in court intrigue, in 901. He spent the next seven years in virtual exile as governor of Mecca, before being recalled by Caliph al-Muqtadir in 908. He quickly distinguished himself by saving al-Muqtadir from a palace coup in December 908. With the support of the caliph and the powerful queen-mother Shaghab, he became commander-in-chief of the caliphal army, in which role he served in several expeditions against the Byzantine Empire, saved Baghdad from the Qarmatians in 927 and defeated two Fatimid invasions of Egypt, in 915 and 920.

In 924 he helped secure the dismissal and execution of his long-time rival, the vizier Ibn al-Furat, after which his political influence grew enormously, to the point that he briefly deposed al-Muqtadir in 928. His rivalry with the caliph and with the civilian bureaucracy of the court finally resulted in an open confrontation in 931–932, that ended with Mu'nis's victory and al-Muqtadir's death in battle. Mu'nis installed a new caliph, al-Qahir, but in August 933 the latter had Mu'nis and his senior officers executed. Mu'nis's usurpation of power, just as his violent end, marked the beginning of a new period of turmoil for the declining Abbasid Caliphate, culminating in its takeover by the Buyids in 946.

== Life ==
=== Career under al-Mu'tadid and exile ===
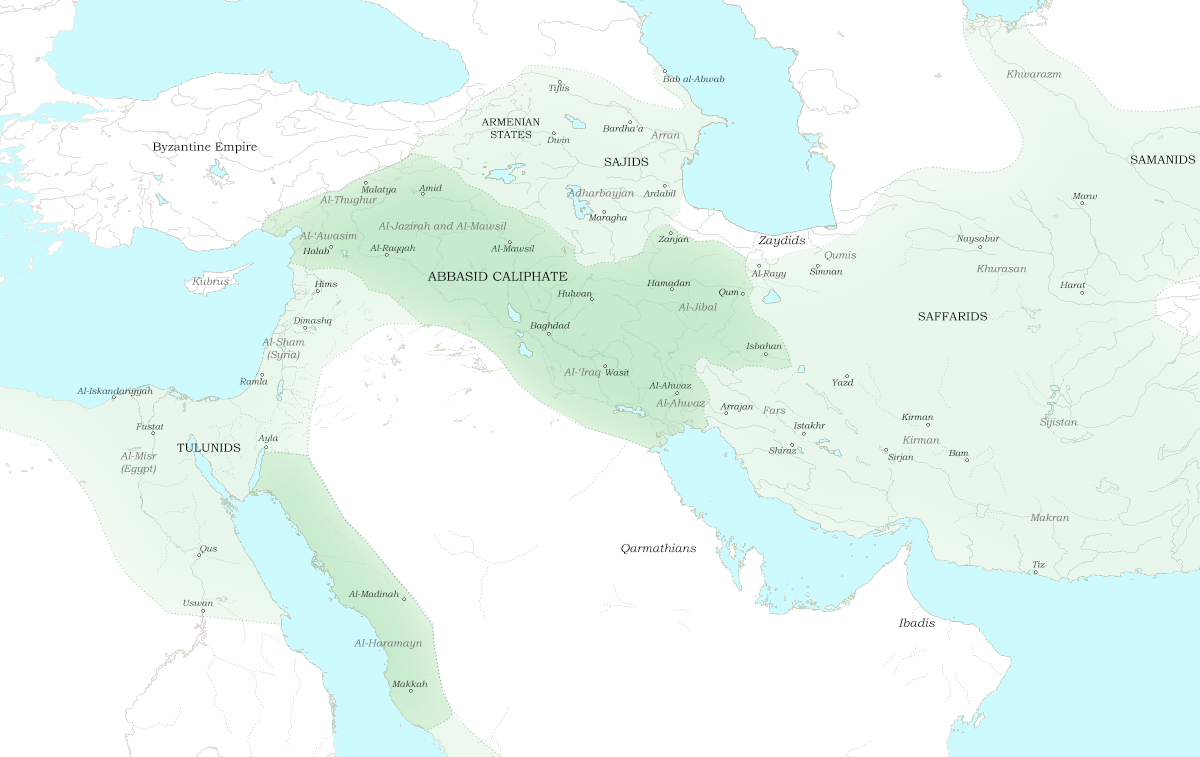
Map showing the result of al-Mu'tadid's campaigns of consolidation, c. 900: areas under direct Abbasid control in dark green, areas under loose Abbasid suzerainty, but under autonomous governors, in light green

According to the fourteenth-century account of al-Dhahabi, Mu'nis was 90 years old at his death, indicating a birth c. 845/6. Of Byzantine Greek origin, he was a eunuch slave, and is hence called al-Khadim ('the Eunuch') in the sources to distinguish him from his contemporary colleague, the treasurer Mu'nis al-Fahl ('the Stallion'). Despite being a harem eunuch, he soon entered a distinguished military career; he first appears as a ghulam (military slave) of the future caliph al-Mu'tadid (r. 892–902) during the suppression of the Zanj Rebellion in 880/1, and had risen to the position of chief of police of the field army (sahib al-shurta al-askar) by 900, and thus deputy to the commander-in-chief, Badr al-Mu'tadidi.

Al-Dhahabi, however, records that in 901 the caliph banished him to Mecca, possibly as its governor, whence he was recalled only after the accession of al-Muqtadir (r. 908–932) in 908. This is apparently corroborated by his complete absence from the sources during the intervening reign of al-Muktafi. The reason for the banishment is unclear, but was likely related to the power struggles between Badr and al-Mu'tadid's last vizier, al-Qasim ibn Ubayd Allah. Al-Muktafi was apparently also hostile to him, possibly because Mu'nis had been involved in harem intrigues in favour of al-Muqtadir. While at Mecca, he took into his entourage the son of the executed Badr, Hilal.

=== Campaigns under al-Muqtadir ===
Mu'nis rose to prominence early during the reign of al-Muqtadir: in December 908, shortly after the caliph's accession, a faction of the bureaucracy and the army launched a coup to depose him and replace him with his brother Abdallah ibn al-Mu'tazz. Mu'nis led the defence of the Hasani Palace and the coup collapsed. This earned him the gratitude and support of the young caliph and his influential and powerful mother, Shaghab, and solidified his position among the grandees of the Abbasid court. Shaghab intended to give him Badr's old role as commander-in-chief, and as a first step, gave him command of the caliphal guard, the Hujariyya. Mu'nis' rise provoked the hostility of the vizier, Ibn al-Furat, who sought to remove him from Baghdad and sent him on campaigns in the frontiers.

In 909 Mu'nis led the customary summer raid (sa'ifa) against the Byzantine Empire, launching an invasion of Byzantine Asia Minor from Malatya and returning with many prisoners. In the next year, he succeeded in recovering the province of Fars from the declining Saffarids, taking advantage of the strife between the Saffarid emir al-Layth and the former Saffarid general Sebük-eri, who had seized control of the province. When al-Layth's brother al-Mu'addal invaded Fars, Sebük-eri called on the caliph for aid, and an army under Mu'nis was sent. Al-Layth was defeated and captured, while Sebük-eri was soon deposed as governor when he failed to gather the promised tribute. In the same year, 909/10, Mu'nis supervised a prisoner exchange with the Byzantines. In December 912/January 913, he was named governor of the Byzantine frontier zone (thughur) and of the Hejaz.

In 914, the Fatimids, who had only a few years before taken over Ifriqiya by ousting the reigning Aghlabids, launched an invasion of Egypt under Abu'l-Qasim, the future caliph al-Qa'im bi-Amr Allah. The Fatimids succeeded in capturing Alexandria, but failed to capture the province's capital at Fustat. In July 914, as deputy of the prince al-Radi (who was the nominal governor), Mu'nis assumed the governorship over Egypt and Syria. In this capacity, in 915 he led Abbasid reinforcements to Egypt and drove them out of the country again, for which he earned the honorific laqab of al-Muzaffar ('the Victorious'). On his return from Egypt, he was ordered to suppress the revolt of his old protégé, the Hamdanid Husayn ibn Hamdan in the Jazira. He then proceeded to the thughur, where the Byzantines, taking advantage of the Hamdanid uprising, had captured the fortress of Hisn Mansur and deported its population. In retaliation, he led a major raid in late summer 916, capturing several fortresses in the vicinity of Malatya, while ordering Abu'l-Qasim Ali to lead another raid from Tarsus. In September/October 917, in response to a Byzantine embassy led by John Rhadenos, he supervised, along with Bishr al-Afshini, the governor of Tarsus and the Cilician thughur, another prisoner exchange on the Lamos River.

In 918–919, Mu'nis campaigned against the rebellious ruler of Adharbayjan, the Sajid Yusuf ibn Abi'l-Saj, who withheld part of the taxes owed to Baghdad and had even seized provinces in northern Iran from the Samanids without the Caliph's approval. In his first campaign in 918, Yusuf initially withdrew before Mu'nis to his capital, Ardabil. After attempts at mediation with the Caliph by the vizier Ibn al-Furat failed, Yusuf confronted Mu'nis in a pitched battle before Ardabil, where Mu'nis was defeated. In the next year, however, Mu'nis defeated Yusuf in a second battle before Ardabil and took him as a prisoner to Baghdad. Yusuf remained captive in Baghdad for three years, while in the meantime, Yusuf's ghulam Subuk held power in Adharbayjan, having secured the Caliph's recognition. It was Mu'nis who was responsible for persuading al-Muqtadir to release Yusuf in 922 and restore him to his old position, this time as a servant of the Abbasid government. In 920–922, Mu'nis was instrumental in defeating a second Fatimid army sent to take Egypt. The Fatimids once again took Alexandria and occupied the Fayyum Oasis, but their fleet was sunk and Alexandria retaken, trapping Abu'l-Qasim in the Fayyum, from which he was able to escape only with heavy losses. In July 922, he was recalled to Baghdad, where he was showered with honours, including the designation as nadim ('imperial guest') and a confirmation of his over-governorship over Egypt and Syria. In 923, he launched another raid into Byzantine territory, capturing a few forts and returning with much booty.

=== Court rivalries and coups ===
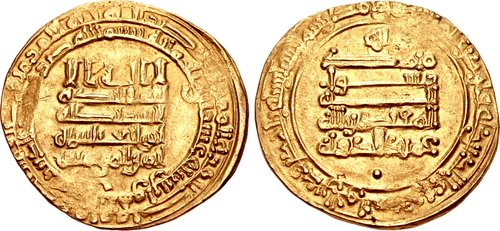
Gold dinar of al-Muqtadir, struck during the last year of his reign

At court, Mu'nis was an early and staunch opponent of Ibn al-Furat, and an ally of the latter's main rival, Ali ibn Isa al-Jarrah and his faction. The conflict between the two came to a head during Ibn al-Furat's third vizierate, in 923–924. This was a troubled period, which saw Mu'nis sent to quasi-exile in Raqqa, the widespread torture of the Banu'l-Furat's political opponents, as well as the resurgence of the Qarmatian threat with the sack of Basra and the destruction of the Hajj caravan returning from Mecca. All this culminated in a military coup, the deposition of Ibn al-Furat, the recall of Mu'nis, and the subsequent execution of the aged vizier and his son.

This marked the apogee of Mu'nis's career: he was now in virtual control of the government and a decisive voice in the appointment of Ibn al-Furat's successors as viziers. At the same time, however, his power created a widening rift between him and the Caliph, with al-Muqtadir even plotting to assassinate his leading general in 927. In the summer of the same year, Mu'nis led an army to the border around Samosata, which the Byzantines had sacked. The Byzantines managed to catch the Abbasid army by surprise and inflicted a defeat upon them, killing 400 men. In the same year Mu'nis, with Hamdanid help, successfully defended Baghdad itself against a determined Qarmatian invasion. The Qarmatian raids were particularly troublesome: not only did they devastate the fertile districts of the Sawad—the government's chief source of revenue—but also diminished the prestige of the Caliph and the dynasty, especially after the Qarmatians sacked Mecca in 930 and carried off the Black Stone, precipitating the power struggle in Baghdad between Mu'nis and the court faction.

In 928, following the dismissal of his favourite, Ali ibn Isa, from the vizierate, Mu'nis launched a coup and deposed al-Muqtadir and installed his half-brother al-Qahir in his place, but reneged after a few days. Mu'nis now possessed virtually dictatorial authority over the Abbasid government. In 931, al-Muqtadir rallied enough support to force him to leave Baghdad, but in 932, after gathering troops, Mu'nis marched onto Baghdad and defeated the caliphal army before the city walls, with al-Muqtadir falling in the field. Triumphant, Mu'nis now installed al-Qahir as caliph, but the two quickly became estranged. The new caliph resumed contacts with the defeated court faction, and found himself soon under confinement in his palace. Nevertheless, in August 933 al-Qahir managed to lure Mu'nis and his main lieutenants to the palace, where they were executed.

== Assessment ==
The role of Mu'nis in the history of the Abbasid Caliphate is ambiguous. Historian Michael Bonner writes of him that he "kept the remnants of the army together and saved the caliphate on several occasions", while according to the Orientalist Harold Bowen, "Mu'nis's influence was on the whole exerted for good", but he was "neither strong nor intelligent enough" to prevent the renewed decline of the Abbasid state. On the other hand, his seizure of power by military force and the killing of a caliph—the first such incident since the Anarchy at Samarra two generations before—set a dangerous precedent and heralded a new period of anarchy; after his death, powerless caliphs became puppets in the hands of a series of regional military strongmen, who vied for the title of amir al-umara and control of the Abbasid government and its revenue until Baghdad, and the Abbasid Caliphate with it, fell to the Buyids in 946.

== Sources ==
- Bianquis, Thierry (1998). "Autonomous Egypt from Ibn Ṭūlūn to Kāfūr, 868–969". In Petry, Carl F. (ed.). The Cambridge History of Egypt: Islamic Egypt, 640–1517. Vol. 1. Cambridge: Cambridge University Press. pp. 86–119. ISBN 0-521-47137-0.
- Bonner, Michael (2010). "The waning of empire, 861–945". In Robinson, Chase F. (ed.). The New Cambridge History of Islam, Volume 1: The Formation of the Islamic World, Sixth to Eleventh Centuries. Cambridge: Cambridge University Press. pp. 305–359. ISBN 978-0-521-83823-8.
- Bosworth, C.E. (1975). "The Ṭāhirids and Ṣaffārids". In Frye, Richard N. (ed.). The Cambridge History of Iran: From the Arab Invasion to the Saljuqs. Vol. 4. Cambridge: Cambridge University Press. pp. 90–135. ISBN 0-521-20093-8.
- Bowen, Harold (1928). The Life and Times of ʿAlí Ibn ʿÍsà, ‘The Good Vizier’. Cambridge: Cambridge University Press.
- Bowen, H. (1993). "Muʾnis al-Muẓaffar". In Bosworth, C. E.; van Donzel, E.; Heinrichs, W. P. & Pellat, Ch. (eds.). The Encyclopaedia of Islam, Second Edition. Volume VII: Mif–Naz. Leiden: E. J. Brill. p. 575. ISBN 978-90-04-09419-2.
- Canard, Marius (1971). "Ḥamdānids". In Lewis, B.; Ménage, V. L.; Pellat, Ch. & Schacht, J. (eds.). The Encyclopaedia of Islam, Second Edition. Volume III: H–Iram. Leiden: E. J. Brill. pp. 126–131. OCLC 495469525.
- Halm, Heinz (1991). Das Reich des Mahdi: Der Aufstieg der Fatimiden [The Empire of the Mahdi: The Rise of the Fatimids] (in German). Munich: C. H. Beck. ISBN 3-406-35497-1.
- Kennedy, Hugh (2004) [1986]. The Prophet and the Age of the Caliphates: The Islamic Near East from the 6th to the 11th Century (Second ed.). Harlow: Longman. ISBN 978-0-582-40525-7.
- Lilie, Ralph-Johannes; Ludwig, Claudia; Pratsch, Thomas; Zielke, Beate (2013). Prosopographie der mittelbyzantinischen Zeit Online. Berlin-Brandenburgische Akademie der Wissenschaften. Nach Vorarbeiten F. Winkelmanns erstellt (in German). Berlin and Boston: De Gruyter.
- Madelung, W. (1975). "The Minor Dynasties of Northern Iran". In Frye, Richard N. (ed.). The Cambridge History of Iran: From the Arab Invasion to the Saljuqs. Vol. 4. Cambridge: Cambridge University Press. pp. 198–249. ISBN 0-521-20093-8.
- Massignon, Louis (1982). The Passion of Al-Hallaj: Mystic and Martyr of Islam. Translated and edited by Herbert Mason (Abridged ed.). Princeton, New Jersey: Princeton University Press. ISBN 0-691-01919-3.
