= Hamid ibn al-Abbas =

Abbasid magnate and vizier (837–923)

Hamid ibn al-Abbas was an Abbasid magnate who served as vizier of Caliph al-Muqtadir in 918–923. For most of that period, real power lay in the hands of his deputy, Ali ibn Isa ibn al-Jarrah, while Hamid tended to his tax farming estates at Wasit.

== Early life ==
He was born in Khurasan in 837, and was of lowly origin: he reportedly began his career with selling water, dates, and pomegranates. He nevertheless managed, through means unknown, to become an extremely wealthy man. As such, he eventually obtained the tax farming contracts for the province of Fars, and then of Wasit. His wealth, and displays of extravagant spending and luxurious living, were well known, and are widely reported on by the historical sources.

== Rise to the vizierate ==
While at Wasit, he unintentionally came into conflict with the vizier Ali ibn al-Furat. Hamid had withheld part of the dues owed to Baghdad in order to secure the renewal of his tax-farming contract. One of Ibn al-Furat's agents, a certain Ibn Jubayr, wrote to him to admonish him and possibly threaten the imposition of a fine; the letter was so insulting to Hamid, that he became infuriated. He replied in the same tone, and began plotting against Ibn al-Furat. For this reason, he approached the local agent of Shaghab, the influential queen-mother of Caliph al-Muqtadir (r. 908–932), giving him fine gifts and mentioning his opposition to Ibn al-Furat.

At the same time, the vizier's political fortunes suffered a setback after the defeat of the Abbasid army under Mu'nis al-Muzaffar by the autonomous strongman of Adharbayjan, Yusuf ibn Abi'l-Saj. Ibn al-Furat then proposed the former rebel al-Husayn ibn Hamdan to lead another army against Ibn Abi'l-Saj, but the chamberlain Nasr al-Qushuri managed to convince the Caliph that this was evidence of Ibn al-Furat plotting to unseat him. As a result, al-Muqtadir ordered the arrest of Ibn al-Furat and his supporters, and the execution of Ibn Hamdan; supported by Nasr, Hamid was appointed as vizier on 11 November 918, and invited to Baghdad.

== Vizierate ==
Hamid entered the capital in pomp and splendour: he was accompanied by four hundred armed retainers, of whom the chief were accoutred like generals of the Caliph's army.

Very soon, however, he proved unfit for the office: he was extremely old, an outsider in the Abbasid political establishment, and completely ignorant of the inner workings of the Abbasid bureaucracy and the court etiquette. When criticized for his lack of decorum, he responded that "Verily God has given me a merry face and a pleasant temper: I am not one to frown up my face and sour my temper for the Vizierate!". As a result, he was induced by the Caliph and his senior courtiers to release the imprisoned former vizier, Ali ibn Isa ibn al-Jarrah, and accept him as deputy.

=== Trial of Ibn al-Furat ===
You are not now dividing a barn, or abusing a farmer, plucking out his beard and beating him, or slaughtering an official’s horse and hanging its head round his neck – no, this assembly and palace are the assembly and palace of the Caliph, whence justice radiates throughout the world.

— Ibn al-Furat's rebuke of Hamid, Harold Bowen, The Life and Times of ʿAlí Ibn ʿÍsà, 'The Good Vizier'

The first action of the new regime was to try Ibn al-Furat for treason. Driven by personal animus, Hamid was determined to secure his condemnation. However, the witness he produced, who provided evidence of Ibn al-Furat's collusion with Ibn Abi'l-Saj to seize Baghdad, faltered during the cross-examination. Ibn al-Furat was thus acquitted of treason, but was then put through another process over his handling of the government during his vizierate.

Here too, the eloquent and shrewd former vizier successfully countered Hamid's ill-prepared accusations. Moreover, he repeatedly turned the tables on both Ali ibn al-Jarrah and Hamid, finally denouncing the latter as unfit for his office, not only due to his origin, but also because he had intrigued for the vizierate solely in order to escape the payment of the money he owed the fisc for his tax-farming contract, which he moreover had omitted to terminate on his elevation to the vizierate. The irate Hamid jumped on the prisoner and tried to tear out his beard, whereupon the Caliph, who was observing the proceedings, ordered the trial to be suspended. These botched trials, and his own behaviour during them, caused heavy damage to Hamid's prestige, and even his allies, Nasr and Ali, blamed him for the failure to convict Ibn al-Furat.

Unable to make headway against Ibn al-Furat, Hamid instead tortured Ibn al-Furat's son, al-Muhassin, and his elderly steward, Musa ibn Khalaf, who died as a result. This, and the prospect of himself being tortured into handing over sums of money as fines for supposed misdeeds, led Ibn al-Furat to the expedient of "voluntarily" paying directly to the Caliph a sum of 700,000 gold dinars.

=== Prosecution of Mansour al-Hallaj ===
Hamid was involved in the prosecution of the Sufi mystic Mansour al-Hallaj.

=== Rivalry with Ali ibn al-Jarrah and retirement ===
A fierce rivalry quickly developed between Hamid and Ali. Outmanoeuvred by his deputy, Hamid asked permission to retire to Wasit, which was granted. He remained nominally the vizier until 7 August 923, when he was dismissed. He was replaced by Ibn al-Furat, and in turn tortured and humiliated by his son, al-Muhassin, before returning to Wasit, where he died in the same year.

== Sources ==
- Bowen, Harold (1928). The Life and Times of ʿAlí Ibn ʿÍsà, ‘The Good Vizier’. Cambridge: Cambridge University Press.
- Massignon, L. (1971). "Ḥāmid". In Lewis, B.; Ménage, V. L.; Pellat, Ch. & Schacht, J. (eds.). The Encyclopaedia of Islam, Second Edition. Volume III: H–Iram. Leiden: E. J. Brill. p. 133. doi:10.1163/1573-3912_islam_SIM_2673. OCLC 495469525.
- van Berkel, Maaike (2013). "The Vizier". Crisis and Continuity at the Abbasid Court: Formal and Informal Politics in the Caliphate of al-Muqtadir (295–320/908–32). Leiden: Brill. pp. 65–86. ISBN 978-90-04-25271-4.

Preceded by Abu'l-Hasan Ali ibn al-Furat	De jure Vizier of the Abbasid Caliphate; De facto Ali ibn Isa ibn al-Jarrah; 22 November 918 – 7 August 923	Succeeded by Abu'l-Hasan Ali ibn al-Furat
