= Kurankij =

10th-century military commander of Abbasids

- Abu Shuja Kurankij ibn Faradi

amir al-umara of the Abbasid Caliphate
- In office 3 July 941 – August 941
- Monarch: al-Muttaqi
- Preceded by: Bajkam
- Succeeded by: Muhammad ibn Ra'iq

Personal details
- Died: Baghdad

Abu Shuja Kurankij ibn Faradi was a Daylamite military commander who briefly became amir al-umara of the Abbasid Caliphate in July–August 941.

== Career ==
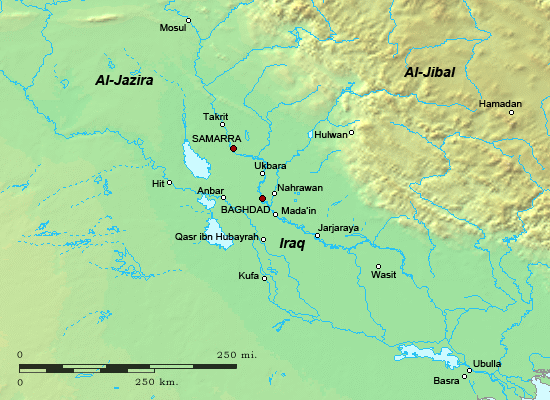
Map of Iraq in the 9th–10th centuries

Kurankij was a commander in the Daylamite contingent in the army of Abu Abdallah al-Baridi, who had captured Baghdad on 31 May 941. On 27 June, the soldiers in al-Baridi's army mutinied, and Kurankij was selected as the leader of the Daylamites, with Takinak selected as the leader of the Turkish contingent. Kurankij and Takinak made common cause and joined their forces to attack al-Baridi and plunder the treasures that al-Baridi had collected. The latter was able to save himself by cutting the bridge between eastern and western Baghdad, and speedily leaving the city, which was consumed by fighting as the populace joined in the army's revolt.

With al-Baridi gone, on 3 July Kurankij was appointed as amir al-umara by the powerless Abbasid caliph al-Muttaqi. On the same night, the Turk Takinak was arrested and drowned. Kurankij chose Abu'l-Faraj ibn Abd al-Rahman al-Isfahani as his secretary (katib), and called on Ali ibn Isa ibn al-Jarrah and his brother Abd al-Rahman to become heads of the administration, but without the title of vizier. This arrangement did not last long, however: within a few days, the Banu'l-Jarrah brothers were dismissed, and Abu Ishaq Muhammad ibn Ahmad al-Qarariti appointed vizier. As al-Baridi had gathered new forces and come up from his base in Basra to Wasit, Kurankij sent his own troops under another Daylamite commander, Ispahan, to confront them. On the news of their approach, the Baridis abandoned Wasit and retreated to Basra.

In the meantime, a previous amir al-umara, Muhammad ibn Ra'iq, who had fled to Syria, was strengthened by an influx of Turkish commanders leaving Baghdad, and received a letter from al-Muttaqi inviting his return to the Abbasid capital. When Kurankij received news of Ibn Ra'iq's march on Baghdad, he recalled Ispahan from Wasit, which almost immediately was captured by the Baridis. On 22 August, he also dismissed the vizier al-Qarariti and replaced him with Abu Ja'far Muhammad ibn Qasim al-Karkhi.

As Ibn Ra'iq approached Baghdad, Kurankij exited the city and made for Ukbara. The two armies fought for several days, but Ibn Ra'iq was unable to secure victory. Nevertheless, on 23 August a detachment of Ibn Ra'iq's army under Ibn Muqatil entered Baghdad, followed two days later by the bulk of Ibn Ra'iq's army, with Kurankij following behind a day later. Kurankij and his men were reportedly contemptuous of their opponent, and Ibn Ra'iq himself is said to have contemplated returning to Syria. But in a fight that broke out in the city itself, some of Ibn Ra'iq's men managed to attack the Daylamites from behind. The Daylamites panicked and were routed, as they were also being attacked by the populace. Kurankij went into hiding, and Ibn Ra'iq's ascendancy was secured. On 22 September, Ibn Ra'iq had the surviving Daylamites executed, and on the next day, he was raised to amir al-umara. Kurankij was discovered and imprisoned in the palace.

When the Baridis under Abu'l-Husayn al-Baridi captured Baghdad in March 942, they found Kurankij still imprisoned. Abu'l-Husayn sent him to his brother in Basra, and nothing further is known of Kurankij thereafter.

== Sources ==
- Amedroz, Henry F.; Margoliouth, David S., eds. (1921). The Eclipse of the 'Abbasid Caliphate. Original Chronicles of the Fourth Islamic Century, Vol. V: The concluding portion of The Experiences of Nations by Miskawaihi, Vol. II: Reigns of Muttaqi, Mustakfi, Muzi and Ta'i. Oxford: Basil Blackwell.
- Bowen, Harold (1928). The Life and Times of ʿAlí Ibn ʿÍsà, ‘The Good Vizier’. Cambridge: Cambridge University Press.
