= Ibn al-Qasim (name) =

Ibn al-Qasim (ابن القاسم) is a component of Arabic masculine names. Notable people whose full name includes "Ibn al-Qasim" or "Ibn al-Kasim" include:

- Abd al-Rahman ibn al-Qasim (c. 750–806), early Maliki jurist
- Muhammad ibn al-Qasim (disambiguation), several people with this name including:
  - Muhammad ibn al-Qasim (695–715), Umayyad military commander and conqueror of Sindh (Pakistan)
  - Muhammad ibn al-Qasim (vizier), official of the Abbasid Caliphate who served as vizier in 933
  - Muhammad ibn al-Qasim al-Badisi (died 1922), Moroccan astronomer, poet and writer
- al-Hajjam al-Hasan ibn Muhammad ibn al-Qasim, tenth Idrisid ruler of Morocco (early 10th century)
- al-Husayn ibn al-Qasim, official of the Abbasid Caliphate who served as vizier in 931–932
- Yahya ibn al-Qasim, ninth Idrisid ruler of Morocco (early 10th century)
