= Al-Qasim (name) =

Al-Qasim is a component of Arabic masculine names literally meaning "the one who distributes", see also "Qasim". Notable people whose full name includes "al-Qasim", "al-Qasem", "al-Qassem", "al-Kasim", etc., include:

== Al-Quasim ==
- Al-Mansur al-Qasim
- Al-Qasim ibn Hasan ibn Ali
- Al-Qasim ibn Ubayd Allah
- Samih al-Qasim
- Al-Qasim ibn Muhammad
- Al-Qasim Jannun (d. 949), Idrisid emir in northern Morocco
- Al-Qasim al-Ma'mun
- Al-Qasim ibn Hasan ibn Ali
- Al-Qasim ibn Ubayd Allah
- Al-Mansur al-Qasim
- Al-Qasim ibn Harun al-Rashid
- Elham Al Qasim
- Faisal al-Qasim
- Al-Qasim al-Rassi
- Al-Mukhtar al-Qasim
- Al-Mutawakkil al-Qasim
- Al-Mansur al-Qasim al-Iyyani

== Other spellings ==
- Faisal al-Qassem
- Farouk Al-Kasim
- Mohamed Al-Qasem

== See also ==
- Abu al-Qasim, "father of Al-Quasim"
- Ibn al-Qasim, "son of Al-Quasim"
