= Muhammad ibn al-Qasim (disambiguation) =

Muhammad ibn al-Qasim (695–715) was an Arab military commander who led the Muslim conquest of Sind

Muhammad ibn al-Qasim may also refer to:

- Muhammad Bin Qasim Road, also known as Burns Road, a street located in Karachi, Sindh (Pakistan)
- Port Muhammad Bin Qasim, also known as Port Qasim, deep-water seaport in Karachi, Sindh (Pakistan)
- Muhammad ibn al-Qasim (Sahib al-Talaqan) (fl. 834), Zaydi imam
- Muhammad ibn al-Qasim (vizier), served briefly as a vizier in 933 under the Abbasid caliph al-Qahir (r. 932–934)
- Muhammad ibn al-Qasim (emir of Algeciras), proclaimed emir of Algeciras in 1039
- Muhammad ibn al-Qasim al-Nuwayri al-Iskandarani (fl. 1365–1373), Muslim historian born in Alexandria (Egypt)
- Muhammad Bin Al-Qasim al-Qundusi (1790–1861), Algerian Sufi calligrapher
- Muhammad ibn al-Qasim al-Badisi (died 1922), Moroccan astronomer, poet and writer
