= Sulayman ibn al-Hasan ibn Makhlad =

Sulayman ibn al-Hasan ibn Makhlad (Arabic: سليمان بن الحسن بن مخلد) (fl. ca. 930–940) was an official of the Abbasid Caliphate. The son of the former vizier al-Hasan ibn Makhlad al-Jarrah, Sulayman rose to occupy the office of vizier three times, in 930–931, 936, and lastly in 940–941, under the amir al-umara Bajkam. According to the modern historian of the Abbasid vizierate, Dominique Sourdel, he was "remarkable mainly for his ineptitude".

== Sources ==
- Sourdel, Dominique (1986). "Ibn Makhlad". The Encyclopedia of Islam, New Edition, Volume III: H–Iram. Leiden and New York: BRILL. p. 859. ISBN 90-04-08118-6.
