= Ibn al-Allaf =

Abū Bakr al-Ḥasan ibn ʿAlī ibn Aḥmad ibn Bashshār ibn Ziyād Ibn al-ʿAllāf al-Nahrawānī (Arabic: أبو بكر الحسن بن علي بن أحمد بن بشار بن زياد ابن العلاف النهرواني, 218-318 AH/833-930 CE) was a poet, associated particularly with al-Muʿtaḍid and Ibn al-Muʿtazz in the Abbasid court at Baghdād. He is said to have composed large numbers of poems, but is best known for a 65-line qaṣīda rhyming on -dī (in the munsariḥ metre). It is thought to be an elegy for Ibn al-Muʿtazz, but is allusive in style, even "including here and there gnomic verses in which he laments the death of his cat, killed by neighbours because it was about to eat their pigeons".
