= Hurra bint Badr =

Wife of Abbasid caliph al-Muqtadir

Hurra bint Badr حرة بنت بدر

Wife of the Abbasid caliph
- Tenure: 13 August 908 – 31 October 932
- Born: 895/99; Baghdad
- Died: 940s Baghdad
- Spouse: al-Muqtadir (until his death 932)
Names
- Hurra bint Badr al-Mu'tadidi
- Father: Abu'l-Najm Badr al-Mu'tadidi
- Religion: Sunni Islam

Hurra bint Badr (Arabic: حرة بنت بدر) was the principal wife of eighteenth Abbasid caliph al-Muqtadir until his death in 932.

Her name, hurra literally means free woman. She and her husband both were very young when there marriage was arranged. She married Jaʿfar (future Abbasid caliph al-Muqtadir) in 900s and joined the Abbasid harem.

Her father was originally a military slave (ghulam or malwa) who served under the caliph al-Mu'tadid. His ability and loyalty led him to become the Caliph's commander-in-chief, exercising considerable influence in the governance of the state throughout Mu'tadid's reign. He was executed on 14 August 902 due to the machinations of the ambitious vizier, al-Qasim ibn Ubayd Allah.

Her husband, al-Muqtadir was the first underage Caliph in Muslim history. He came to power in 908 after his brother's death. Hurra was al-Muqtadir's only wife. She was the daughter of Commander-in-Chief, Badr al-Mu'tadidi.

Al-Muqtadir was generous towards her. After his death, she remarried a man of lower status.

== Sources ==
- Osti, Letizia (2013). "The Caliph". Crisis and Continuity at the Abbasid Court: Formal and Informal Politics in the Caliphate of al-Muqtadir (295–320/908–32). Leiden: Brill. pp. 49–61. ISBN 978-90-04-25271-4.
- Brubaker, L.; Tougher, S. (2016). Approaches to the Byzantine Family. Birmingham Byzantine and Ottoman Studies. Taylor & Francis. ISBN 978-1-317-18001-2.
- Massignon, Louis (1994). The Passion of Al-Hallaj: Mystic and Martyr of Islam. Translated by Herbert Mason. Princeton University Press. ISBN 978-0-691019192.
