= Ibn al-Rumi =

Arabic poet of Abbasid era (836–896)

Ibn al-Rūmī ابن الرومى
- أبو الحسن علي بن العباس بن جريج
- Born: 21 June 836; Baghdad, Abbasid Caliphate (now in Iraq)
- Died: 13 July 896 (aged 60); Baghdad, Abbasid Caliphate, now Iraq

Philosophical work
- Era: Islamic Golden Age (Abbasid era)
- Region: Iraq, Arab world, Muslim world
- Main interests: Arabic poetry

Abū al-Ḥasan Alī ibn al-Abbās ibn Jūrayj (Arabic: أبو الحسن علي بن العباس بن جريج), also known as Ibn al-Rūmī (born Baghdad in 836; died 896), was the grandson of George the Greek (Jūraij or Jūrjis i.e. Georgius) and a popular Arab poet of Baghdād in the Abbāsid-era.

By the age of twenty he earned a living from his poetry. His many political patrons included the governor Ubaydallah ibn Abdallah ibn Tahir, Abbasid caliph Al-Mu'tamid's minister the Persian Isma'il ibn Bulbul, and the politically influential Nestorian family Banū Wahb. In the tenth century his Dīwān (collected poetry), which had been transmitted orally by al-Mutanabbī, was arranged and edited by Abū Bakr ibn Yaḥyā al-Ṣūlī, and included in the section of his book Kitāb Al-Awrāq (كتاب الاوراق) on muḥadathūn (modern poets).

== Early life ==
Ibn al-Rumi was born in Baghdad, then the capital of the Abbasid Caliphate, in 836. Originally named Ali bin Al-Abbas bin George, he was given the epithet "Ibn al-Rumi" (lit. "Son of the Roman), referring to his father's Greek ancestry. He was raised a Muslim.

== Death ==
Ibn al-Rumi died in Baghdad in the year 896, at the age of 59. His early biographer Ibn Khallikān relates an account that he was given poisoned biscuits in the presence of the caliph Al-Mu'tadid on the orders of his vizier, Al-Qasim ibn Ubayd Allah, whom Ibn al-Rumī had satirised viciously. In another account his death is attributed to suicide.

== Bibliography ==
- Khallikān (Ibn), Aḥmad ibn Muḥammad (1843). Wafayāt al-A'yān wa-Anbā' Abnā' al-Zamān (The Obituaries of Eminent Men). Vol. II. Translated by McGuckin de Slane, William. Paris: Oriental Translation Fund of Great Britain and Ireland. pp. 297–301.
- Nadīm (al), Abū al-Faraj Muḥammad ibn Isḥāq Abū Ya’qūb al-Warrāq (1970). Dodge, Bayard (ed.). The Fihrist of al-Nadim; a tenth-century survey of Muslim culture. New York & London: Columbia University Press. pp. 283, 325, 331, 366, 374, 1085.
- Nadīm (al-), Abū al-Faraj Muḥammad ibn Isḥāq (1872). Flügel, Gustav (ed.). Kitāb al-Fihrist (in Arabic). Leipzig: F.C.W. Vogel. p. 570 (150).
- Gruendler, Beatrice (2003). Medieval Arabic Praise Poetry: Ibn Al-Rūmī and the Patron's Redemption. Routledge. ISBN 0-7007-1490-1.
- McKinney, Robert C. (2004). The Case of Rhyme v. Reason: Ibn al-Rūmī and his Poetics in Context. Brill. ISBN 90-04-13010-1.
- El-Huni, Ali A., 'The poetry of Ibn al-Rùmī' (unpublished Ph.D. thesis, University of Glasgow, 1996)
- ابن الرومي [Ibn al-Rumi], ديوان ابن الرومي [Diwan al-Rumi], 3 vols (Beirut: Dār al-Kutub al-ʻIlmīyah, 2009), ISBN 978-2745107985, https://archive.org/details/waq74354
- Ibn al-Rūmī, Selections from the Diwan of Ibn Al Rumi (William Penn College, 1977)
