= Ibn Ghazi al-Miknasi =

Moroccan scholar and Arabic philologist

Personal life
- Born: Abu Abdallah Muhammad ibn Ahmad ibn Muhammad Ibn Ghazi al-'Uthmani al-Miknasi; 1437 Meknes, Morocco
- Died: 1513 (aged 75–76) Fez, Morocco
- Main interest(s): History, Islamic law, Arabic philology, Mathematics
- Notable works: Three-volume history of Meknes; Commentary on Ibn al-Banna's treatise, Munyat al-hussab; Bughyat al-tulab fi sharh munyat al-hussab; Kulliyat

Religious life
- Religion: Islam
- Denomination: Sunni
- Jurisprudence: Maliki

Abu Abdallah Muhammad ibn Ahmad ibn Muhammad Ibn Ghazi al-'Uthmani al-Miknasi (Arabic: ابن غازي المكناسي) (1437–1513) was a Moroccan scholar in the field of history, Islamic law, Arabic philology and mathematics. He was born in Meknes from Banu Uthman, a clan in the Berber kutama tribe, but spent his life in Fez. Ibn Ghazi wrote a three-volume history of Meknes and a commentary to the treatise of Ibn al-Banna, Munyat al-hussab. Ibn Ghazi wrote another treatise based on his commentary titled Bughyat al-tulab fi sharh munyat al-hussab ("The desire of students for an explanation of the calculator's craving"). He included sections on arithmetic and algebraic methods. He is also the author of Kulliyat, a short work on legal questions and judgements in the Maliki madhab.
