= Abdallah ibn al-Mu'tazz =

Abbasid prince, poet and politician (861–908)

Abdallah ibn al-Mu'tazz عبد الله بن المعتز
- Born: c. 861; Samarra, Abbasid Caliphate
- Died: 29 December 908; Baghdad, Abbasid Caliphate
- Burial: Baghdad
- Spouse: Dawlah
Names
- Abdallah ibn al-Mu'tazz
- Dynasty: Abbasid
- Father: Al-Mu'tazz
- Mother: Fatimah bint al-Fath
- Religion: Sunni Islam

Abdallah ibn al-Mu'tazz (Arabic: عبد الله بن المعتز, romanized: ʿAbd Allāh ibn al-Muʿtazz; 861 – 29 December 908) was the son of the caliph al-Mu'tazz and a political figure, but is better known as a leading Arabic poet and the author of the Kitab al-Badi, an early study of Arabic forms of poetry. This work is considered one of the earliest works in Arabic literary theory and literary criticism.

Persuaded to assume the role of caliph of the Abbasid dynasty following the premature death of al-Muktafi, he succeeded in ruling for a single day and a single night, before he was forced into hiding, found and then strangled in a palace intrigue that brought al-Muqtadir, then thirteen years old, to the throne.

== Biography ==
Born in Samarra as a prince of the imperial house and the great-great-grandson of Harun al-Rashid, Ibn al-Mu'tazz had a tragic childhood in the complicated intrigues of the Abbasid caliphate. His grandfather, the caliph al-Mutawakkil, was assassinated when Ibn al-Mu'tazz was only six weeks old. These events ushered in the nine-year Anarchy at Samarra. Abdallah ibn al-Mu'tazz's father, al-Mu'tazz 13th Caliph of the Abbasid Caliphate, came to power in 866, but in 869 was also murdered. The boy was spared the purge of the palace by fleeing to Mecca with his grandmother Qabiha.

Upon returning to Baghdad soon after, he distanced himself from politics and lived the hedonistic life of a young prince. It was during this time that he wrote his poetry, devoted to the pleasures with which he was so familiar.

In 908, his cousin Caliph al-Muktafi fell ill, and was evidently nearing his end. The issue of succession had been left open, and with the Caliph incapacitated, the vizier al-Abbas ibn al-Hasan al-Jarjara'i took it upon himself to seek out a successor. Two different versions are told of the events: Miskawayh reports that the vizier sought the advice of the most important bureaucrats (kuttāb, sing. kātib), with Mahmud ibn Dawud ibn al-Jarrah suggesting the older and experienced Abdallah ibn al-Mu'tazz, but Ali ibn al-Furat—who is usually portrayed as a villain by Miskawayh—proposing instead the thirteen-year-old Ja'far al-Muqtadir as someone weak, pliable, and easily manipulated by the senior officials. The vizier also consulted Ali ibn Isa al-Jarrah, who refused to choose, and Muhammad ibn Abdun, whose opinion has not been recorded. In the end, the vizier concurred with Ibn al-Furat, and on al-Muktafi's death Ja'far was proclaimed as heir and brought to the caliphal palace; when the testament of al-Muktafi was opened, he too had chosen his brother as his successor. A different story is reported by the Andalusi historian Arib, whereby the vizier dithered between the candidacies of Ibn al-Mu'tazz and another older Abbasid prince, Muhammad ibn al-Mu'tamid. The choice of the latter would represent a major political departure, in effect a repudiation of al-Mu'tadid's coup that had deprived the offspring of al-Mu'tamid from power, and of the officials and ghilmān that had underpinned al-Mu'tadid's regime. The vizier indeed inclined towards Muhammad, but the latter prudently chose to await al-Muktafi's death before accepting. Indeed, the Caliph recovered, and was informed that people were discussing both Ibn al-Mu'tazz and Ibn al-Mu'tamid as his possible successors. This worried al-Muktafi, who in the presence of the qāḍīs as witnesses officially nominated Ja'far as his heir, before dying. The two stories highlight different aspects of al-Muqtadir's accession: on the one hand, a cabal of officials choosing a weak and pliable ruler, "a sinister development" that inaugurated one "of the most disastrous reigns in the whole of Abbasid history [...] a quarter of a century in which all of the work of [al-Muqtadir's] predecessors would be undone", while on the other hand, the issue of dynastic succession, and especially the loyalty of al-Mu'tadid's ghilmān to his family, evidently also played an important role.

Al-Muqtadir's succession was unopposed, and proceeded with the customary ceremonies. The full treasury bequeathed by al-Mu'tadid and al-Muktafi meant that the donatives to the troops could easily be paid, as well as reviving the old practice of gifts to the members of the Hashimite families. The new caliph was also able to display his largess, and solicitude for his subjects, when he ordered the demolition of a suq erected by his predecessor near Bab al-Taq, where the merchants were forced to pay rent, instead of being able to offer their wares freely as before. This benefited the poor of the capital.

Nevertheless, the intrigues surrounding his accession had not abated. The supporters of Abdallah ibn al-Mu'tazz in particular remained determined to get their candidate on the throne. According to Arib, the vizier al-Abbas had been one of the chief conspirators, but had begun to acquiesce to al-Muqtadir's rule, hoping to control him. His increasingly arrogant behaviour spurred the other conspirators on, and on 16 December 908, the commander al-Husayn ibn Hamdan led a group of men that killed the vizier as he was riding to his garden. The conspirators then sought to seize the young caliph as well, but the latter had managed to flee to the Hasani Palace, where he barricaded himself with his supporters. The ḥājib (chamberlain) Sawsan was the driving force behind the loyalists' resistance, urging the commanders Safi al-Hurami, Mu'nis al-Khadim, and Mu'nis al-Khazin, to defend the caliph. Al-Husayn tried the entire morning to gain entrance, but failed; and then abruptly, and without notifying his fellow conspirators, fled the city to his home of Mosul. In the meantime, the other conspirators, led by Mahmud ibn Dawud ibn al-Jarrah, had assembled in a house and proclaimed Ibn al-Mu'tazz as caliph. This had the support of some of the qāḍīs, who regarded al-Muqtadir's accession as illegal, but others were opposed, reflecting the uncertainty and indecision of the conspirators themselves. Along with Ibn Hamdan's departure, this indecision allowed al-Muqtadir's followers to regain the upper hand: Mu'nis al-Khadim led his ghilmān on boats across the Tigris to the house where Ibn al-Mu'tazz and the conspirators had gathered, and dispersed them—Arib records that Mu'nis' troops attacked the assembled supporters of Ibn al-Mu'tazz with arrows, while Miskawayh claims that they fled as soon as the troops appeared.

== Death and legacy ==
Al-Abbas ibn al-Hasan al-Jarjara'i wished to install thirteen-year-old Al-Muqtadir on the throne, clearly intending to be the power behind the throne himself. Despite his reluctance, Ibn al-Mu'tazz was persuaded by the opposition (his supporters) to assume the caliphate instead, in the hope that he would put an end to the intrigues that had plagued the dynasty for decades. He was crowned on 17 December 908, but was overthrown the same day. He fled the palace in Baghdad and hid with a friend, but was found on 29 December and strangled.

Almost prophetically, he had once written as a poet:

A wonderful night, but so short
I brought it to life, then strangled it.

And he also once wrote as a poet:

خل الذنوب صغيرها\\وكبيرها ذاك التقى
واصنع كماشٍ فوق أر\\ض الشوك يحذر ما يرى
لا تحقرن صغيرةً\\إن الجبال من الحصى

Translation:

Abandon sins, big and small – that is piety.
And be like the one who walks on a thorny path, he is cautious of what he sees.
Do not belittle the small sins; truly mountains are made of pebbles

=== Literary works ===
Al-Mu'tazz's Kitab al-Badi, composed in 888 when he was 27, laid the groundwork for future studies of poetry by Arabic scholars. Its title can be translated as 'the book of the new style', and 'takes its name from its polemical aim, namely to show that the style of the poets called "modern" (muḥdathūn), such as Bashshār b. Burd (d. 167 or 168/784-5), Muslim b. al-Walīd (d. 208/823), or Abū Nuwās (d. between 198/813 and 200/815), is not so very "new" and that none of its features was not anticipated in the Quran, the traditions of Muḥammad and his companions, and old poetry.'

In the estimation of Charles Greville Tuety:

Ibn Al-Mu‘tazz is the spontaneous poet, akin in temper to Abu Nuwās. Free-ranging in his choice of subject, he is noted for newness of approach in handling his themes. What makes him essentially new, however, lies on another plane and is not immediately apparent: Carried along by his bold and sensuous imagery, we are satisfied that it is so, until, on pausing, we suddenly glimpse the perspective beyond.

=== Editions ===
There are two main editions of Al-Mu‘tazz's dīwān: Muhammad Badī‘ Šarīf (ed.), Dīwān aš‘ār al-amīr Abī l-‘Abbās ‘Abdallāh b. Muḥammad al-Mu‘tazz, Dahā’ir al-‘Arab (Cairo: Dār al-Ma‘ārif, 1977-78) and Yūnus Ahmad as-Sāmarrā’ī (ed.), Ši‘r Ibn al-Mu‘tazz: Qism 1: ad-Dīwān'; Qism 2: ad-Dirāsa, two parts in four volumes (Baghdad: Wizārat al-I‘lām, al-Ǧumhūrīya al-‘Irāqīa [Iraqi Ministry of Information], 1978). Of the two, the latter is more reliable, but at times the former offers better readings.

Another edition is ديوان ابن المعتز [Dīwān ibn al-Mu'tazz], ed. by عبد الله بن المعتز (دار صادر [Dar Sader] [n.d.]).

== See also ==
- Al-Mufawwid
