= Al-Hasan ibn Makhlad al-Jarrah =

Al-Hasan ibn Makhlad ibn al-Jarrah (Arabic: الحسن بن مخلد بن الجراح) was a senior official of the Abbasid Caliphate. Born a Nestorian Christian, he converted to Islam late in life, and served as secretary under Caliph al-Mutawakkil (r. 847–861). Under Caliph al-Mu'tamid (r. 870–892) he occupied twice the highest civil administrative office, that of vizier, first in 877 and again in 878/9. He was dismissed by the powerful regent, the Caliph's brother al-Muwaffaq, and exiled to Egypt and then Antioch, where he probably died in 882.

His son Sulayman also served thrice as vizier of the Caliphate.

== Sources ==
- Sourdel, Dominique (1971). "Ibn Makhlad". In Lewis, B.; Ménage, V. L.; Pellat, Ch. & Schacht, J. (eds.). The Encyclopaedia of Islam, Second Edition. Volume III: H–Iram. Leiden: E. J. Brill. p. 859. OCLC 495469525.

Preceded by Ubayd Allah ibn Yahya ibn Khaqan	Vizier of the Abbasid Caliphate; August–September 877	Succeeded by Sulayman ibn Wahb
Preceded by Sulayman ibn Wahb	Vizier of the Abbasid Caliphate; July–August 878	Succeeded by Isma'il ibn Bulbul
