= Al-Husayn ibn al-Qasim =

Abbasid Vizier and Official (931–932)

Al-Husayn ibn al-Qasim الحسين بن القاسم
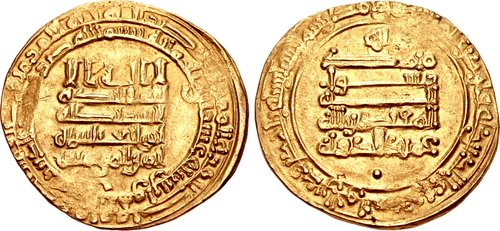
- Gold dinar of al-Muqtadir with the names of his heir, Abu 'l-Abbas, and vizier, Amid al-Dawla
- Born: Abbasid Caliphate
- Died: Baghdad, Abbasid Caliphate
- Other names: Ibn al-Qasim; Amid al-Dawla (title)
- Occupation(s): Abbasid vizier and official
- Years active: September 931 – May 932 (under al-Muqtadir)
- Father: Al-Qasim ibn Ubayd Allah
- Relatives: Muhammad ibn al-Qasim (brother)

Al-Husayn ibn al-Qasim (Arabic: الحسين بن القاسم) was a senior official of the Abbasid Caliphate who served as vizier from September 931 until May 932.

== Life ==
Hailing from the Banu Wahb, a family of Nestorian Christian origin that had served in the caliphal bureaucracy since late Umayyad times, al-Husayn was the son, grandson and great-grandson of viziers. The family however had lost power after the death of al-Husayn's father al-Qasim in 904.

He was appointed to the vizierate and the title of Amid al-Dawla ("Mainstay/Pillar of the State") by Caliph al-Muqtadir (r. 908–932) in September 931, with the support of the Banu'l-Furat faction against the rival faction around Ali ibn Isa al-Jarrah and the commander-in-chief Mu'nis al-Muzaffar. He quickly managed to win over Mu'nis' proteges, the chamberlain Muhammad ibn Ra'iq and his brother Ibrahim, and began plotting against Mu'nis. The latter tried to secure his dismissal from the caliph, and almost succeeded; it was only his demand that al-Husayn be exiled to Oman that made al-Muqtadir oppose it. At the same time, al-Husayn felt so threatened by the powerful general that he slept in a different house each night to prevent his arrest.

According to the scholar C.E. Bosworth, al-Husayn was "perhaps the last vizier to attempt to retain for the vizierate a measure of its former independence". He tried to restore the state finances, but fell from power due to the incessant court rivalries in May 932.

== Sources ==
- Bosworth, C.E. (2002). "Wahb". In Bearman, P. J.; Bianquis, Th.; Bosworth, C. E.; van Donzel, E. & Heinrichs, W. P. (eds.). The Encyclopaedia of Islam, Second Edition. Volume XI: W–Z. Leiden: E. J. Brill. pp. 33–34. ISBN 978-90-04-12756-2.
- Bowen, Harold (1928). The Life and Times of ʿAlí Ibn ʿÍsà, ‘The Good Vizier’. Cambridge: Cambridge University Press. OCLC 982525160.

Preceded by Ubayd Allah al-Kalwadhani	Vizier of the Abbasid Caliphate; September 931 – May 932	Succeeded by Al-Fadl ibn Ja'far ibn al-Furat
