= Muhammad ibn al-Qasim al-Badisi =

Moroccan astronomer, poet and writer

- Born: Fes, Morocco
- Died: 1922; Abu 'Asriya al-Fasi's shrine, al-Qattanin quarter, Ksar el-Kebir, Morocco
- Resting place: Abu Yahya al-Mallah mausoleum, Bab el-Oued quarter, Ksar el-Kebir, Morocco
- Occupation(s): Astronomer, poet, writer

Muhammad ibn al-Qasim al-Badisi (died 1922) was a Moroccan astronomer, poet and writer.

== Biography ==
Muhammad was born in Fez to the al-Badisi family that was originally from the village of A'rras in the Badis town. He studied under famous scholars of Fez such as Muhammad al-Qadiri, Muhammad Guennoun, Abd al-Salam al-Hawwari, al-Mahdi al-Wazzani and the Qadi of Fez 'Abd Allah Ibn Khadra. Besides his studies in fiqh, he was also interested in astronomy, language, ʻilm al-mīqāt and literature.

He went to El Jadida to work as adel with qadi al-Abid ibn Suda, at this city he started teaching principles of language and religion. One of his students was Abd al-Salam ibn Suda who wrote a tarjama (biographical notice) about him in his work Sall an-nisal li 'n-nidal, bi 'l-ashyakh wa-ahl al-kamāl. Returning to Fez, he worked in lithography, and chose to illustrate works of literature and 'ilm al-miqat (science of timekeeping). One of the most known books that he printed was Abd al-Rahman al-Jadiri's Rawdat al-azhar fl 'ilm waqt al-layl wa an-nahar.

Finally, he went to Ksar el-Kebir, where he was liked by the general population and the caid of the city, Bousselam Rmiki. He first worked as a teacher, but he started criticising sufi orders, ziyārat and tawassul (Intercession of saints). His zealous support for wahhabism was showing, people started turning away from him and some fuqaha' issued a fatwa against him for his "ibtida'" (to initiate illegitimate innovations) and "muruq" (deviation). This ultimately forced him to become a recluse in the shrine of Abu 'Asriya al-Fasi in the al-Qattanin quarter.

He was sick for a while until his death in 1922 and was buried in the mausoleum of Abu Yahya al-Mallah in the Bab el-Oued quarter.

== Sources ==
- Ben Azzouz Hakim, Mohamed (1984). "al-Badisi". In Toufiq, Ahmed; Hajji, Mohamed (eds.). Ma'lamat al-Maghrib (in Arabic). Vol. 3. al-Jamī‘a al-Maghribiyya li-l-Ta’līf wa-l-Tarjama wa-l-Nashr.
- Hajji, Mohamed (1984). "al-Badisi, Muhammad ibn al-Qasim". In Toufiq, Ahmed; Hajji, Mohamed (eds.). Ma'lamat al-Maghrib (Encyclopedia of Morocco) (in Arabic). Vol. 3. al-Jamī‘a al-Maghribiyya li-l-Ta’līf wa-l-Tarjama wa-l-Nashr.
