= Al-Qasim ibn Ubayd Allah =

Abbasid Vizier and Official (901–904)

Al-Qasim ibn Ubayd Allah القاسم بن عبيد الله
- Born: Abbasid Caliphate
- Died: October 904; Baghdad, Abbasid Caliphate
- Other names: Abu'l-Husayn; Ibn Ubayd Allah; Wali al-Dawla (title)
- Occupations: Abbasid vizier and official
- Years active: April 901 – October 904 (under Al-Muktafi)
- Children: Al-Husayn ibn al-Qasim; Muhammad ibn al-Qasim
- Father: Ubayd Allah ibn Sulayman

Abu'l-Husayn al-Qasim ibn Ubayd Allah (Arabic: أبو الحسين القاسم بن عبيد الله) was a senior official of the Abbasid Caliphate who served as vizier from April 901 until his own death in October 904.

Hailing from the Banu Wahb, a family of Nestorian Christian origin that had served in the caliphal bureaucracy since late Umayyad times, al-Qasim was the son and grandson of viziers. He had served as aide to his father, Ubayd Allah ibn Sulayman, during the latter's decade-long vizierate, and then succeeded him upon his death, heading the government during the last months of the reign of al-Mu'tadid (r. 892–902) and the early years of al-Muktafi (r. 902–908). Al-Qasim largely dominated the young al-Muktafi, who awarded him the title of Wali al-Dawla (Arabic: ولي الدولة, lit. 'Protector of the Dynasty') and gave one of his daughters to one of al-Qasim's sons.

Unlike his father, who was widely esteemed for his honesty and justice, al-Qasim was corrupt and cruel, ordering the executions of anyone that displeased him or presented a potential challenge, such as the Saffarid emir Amr ibn al-Layth, the general Badr al-Mu'tadidi, or the poet Ibn al-Rumi. The powerful finance secretary Ali ibn al-Furat was saved from a similar fate only by al-Qasim's illness and death. This death meant the end of the Banu Wahb's hold on power, which now passed to the Banu'l-Furat. Only a generation later would al-Qasim's sons al-Husayn and Muhammad also rise to become viziers.

== Sources ==
- Bosworth, C.E. (2002). "Wahb". In Bearman, P. J.; Bianquis, Th.; Bosworth, C. E.; van Donzel, E. & Heinrichs, W. P. (eds.). The Encyclopaedia of Islam, Second Edition. Volume XI: W–Z. Leiden: E. J. Brill. pp. 33–34. ISBN 978-90-04-12756-2.

Preceded by Ubayd Allah ibn Sulayman	Vizier of the Abbasid Caliphate; April 901 – October 904	Succeeded by al-Abbas ibn al-Hasan al-Jarjara'i
