= Ya'qub ibn Dawud =

1st Abbasid vizier and confidant of Abbasid caliph al-Mahdi

Ya'qub ibn Dawud يعقوب بن داود
- Died: c. 802; Mecca, Abbasid Caliphate
- Other names: Abu Abdallah
- Occupation: Abbasid vizier
- Years active: c. 779/80–782/3
- Era: Abbasid era
- Known for: First Abbasid vizier and Close confidant of the Abbasid Caliph al-Mahdi
- Children: Abdallah ibn Ya'qub
- Father: Dawud

Abu Abdallah Ya'qub ibn Dawud (Arabic: أبو عبدالله يعقوب بن داود) (died 802) was a close confidant of the Abbasid Caliph al-Mahdi (r. 775–785) and vizier of the Caliphate for a period of three years (779/80–782/3).

== Biography ==
Ya'qub was born to a family known for its Alid sympathies, and participated in the failed Alid revolt of 762–763. He was subsequently imprisoned until released by al-Mahdi, who endeavoured to heal the dispute between the Abbasids and the Alids, soon after his accession. He quickly became one of the Caliph's closest advisors, placing his contacts with the Alids in the service of Mahdi's conciliatory policy, although it is reported that he first gained the Caliph's favour by betraying another Alid sympathizer who planned to escape.

He was raised to the vizierate in 779–80 and played an ever-increasing role in the caliphal administration until his abrupt fall from power in 782/3. In the words of Islamic scholar Hugh N. Kennedy, "never before had a member of the bureaucracy established such control over policy-making". In this way, Ya'qub became the antecedent of a series of powerful civil officials who dominated the government at Baghdad, who came to prominence with the Barmakids and reached the apex of their power in the early 10th century. Nevertheless, his increasing power and his pro-Alid policies brought about his downfall, after his enemies got to the Caliph himself. Allegedly, the Caliph tested his loyalty by handing over to him an Alid supporter and ordering his execution. When Ya'qub instead let him escape, he was dismissed from his offices and imprisoned.

He was released from prison on the accession of Harun al-Rashid (r. 786–809), and journeyed to Mecca, where he spent his final years until his death, probably in 802.

== Sources ==
- Kennedy, Hugh (2004) [1986]. The Prophet and the Age of the Caliphates: The Islamic Near East from the 6th to the 11th Century (Second ed.). Harlow: Longman. ISBN 978-0-582-40525-7.
- Moscati, S. (1960). "Abū ʿAbd Allāh Yaʿqub". In Gibb, H. A. R.; Kramers, J. H.; Lévi-Provençal, E.; Schacht, J.; Lewis, B. & Pellat, Ch. (eds.). The Encyclopaedia of Islam, Second Edition. Volume I: A–B. Leiden: E. J. Brill. p. 103. OCLC 495469456.
- Sourdel, Dominique (1959). Le vizirat abbâside de 749 à 936 (132 à 324 de l'hégire) [Abbasid vizierate from 749 to 936 (132-324)] (in French). Vol. I. Damascus: Institut français de Damas.
