= Mu'nis al-Fahl =

General of the Abbasid Caliphate (died 914)

Mu'nis, surnamed al-Fahl ("the Stallion") and also known as al-Khazin ("the Treasurer"), to distinguish him from his contemporary Mu'nis al-Khadim, was a senior general of the Abbasid Caliphate in the reigns of al-Mu'tadid, al-Muktafi and al-Muqtadir.

Under al-Mu'tadid he served as commander of the caliph's personal guard and led various expeditions against Bedouins and other restive elements in Iraq, while al-Muqtafi dispatched him in 906 against the Qarmatians. After al-Muqtafi's death, he played a decisive role in the suppression of the palace coup that briefly deposed al-Muqtadir in favour of Abdallah ibn al-Mu'tazz. He was then named treasurer (khazin) and chief of security (sahib al-shurta) to the Caliph. He died in 914.

== Sources ==
- Bosworth, C.E. (1993). "Muʾnis al-Faḥl". In Bosworth, C. E.; van Donzel, E.; Heinrichs, W. P. & Pellat, Ch. (eds.). The Encyclopaedia of Islam, Second Edition. Volume VII: Mif–Naz. Leiden: E. J. Brill. p. 575. ISBN 978-90-04-09419-2.
