= Badis, Morocco =

Town in Morocco

Coordinates: 35.16889°N 4.28833°W

Badis was a town in Morocco, 25 km west of Al Hoceima, between the territory of the Ghomara and the Riffians. The area belongs to the Beni Itteft (Ait Itteft).

== History ==
Badis was part of the Emirate of Nekor, and after the Idrisids, Almoravids, Almohads, and Marinids; the last three dynasties used it as a naval base. It had some importance under the Marinid sultan Abu Said (r. 1310–1331) and paid the same taxes—1000 dinars—as Melilla and Larache. Badis had an arsenal and shipyards. The population engaged in fishing and piracy and was the seat of the governor of the Rif that embraced the entire coast and some inland tribes (Bekkoya, Beni Mansour, Beni Khalid, Beni Yadir). In his visit to the town, Leo Africanus described it as having 600 households.

About 100 meters, there are two rocky islets, the largest called Hajar Badis, which the Spaniards call Peñón de Vélez, and which they occupied in 1508, an occupation that lasted until 1520. In 1526 the Wattasid sultan Abu Hassun, dethroned by his brother, received as a feud the Rif, with his seat at Badis (for this reason he was called al-Badisi). In 1554 he ceded the city and island to his Ottoman allies in Algiers who made it a nest for pirates operating in the Strait of Gibraltar. The Saadid sultan Abdallah al-Ghalib saw this activity and the Ottoman presence with a very bad eye, as it could be a base for the conquest of his kingdom, and in 1564 he ceded the town and island to Spain; the Moroccan inhabitants were evacuated. The town was depopulated and soon fell into ruins. The rock is still preserved by the Spaniards and named Peñón de Vélez de la Gomera.

== Notable natives or residents ==
- Abd al-Haqq al-Badisi, biographer
- Abu Yaqub Yusuf al-Zuhayli al-Badisi, a 14th century saint and savant
- Ali Abu Hassun, Wattasid sultan, lived in Badis from 1526 to 1549.

== Sources ==
- Colin, G.S. (1986) [1960]. "Bādis". In Bearman, P.; Bianquis, Th.; Bosworth, C.E.; van Donzel, E.; Heinrichs, W.P. (eds.). Encyclopaedia of Islam. Vol. I (2nd ed.). Leiden, Netherlands: Brill Publishers. p. 859. doi:10.1163/1573-3912_islam_SIM_0995. ISBN 9004081143.
