= Elham Al Qasim =

Emirati woman (born 1982)

Elham Al Qasim (born July 1982, in Dubai) is an Emirati woman, who embarked on a successful skiing expedition to the North Pole “unsupported and unassisted” (two terms used in polar expeditions, denoting use of natural means and without any kind of assistance). On April 23, 2010, she became the first Arab woman and the first female UAE national to reach the North Pole.

== Degrees ==
- Degree in Business and Marketing at the American University in Dubai in 2004
- MSc in Management of NGOs from London School of Economics

== Training ==
Before embarking on the journey, Elham went through an intensive workout to build up her mental and physical strength and develop the required stamina. The training program was laid down by Lomax with the main objective being an overall improvement in her strength, agility, and speed.

== Personal ==
In December 2011 Elham married successful entrepreneur Joshua Hannan (Australian)
