= Abu Yaqub Yusuf al-Zuhayli al-Badisi =

Abu Yaqub Yusuf al-Zuhayli al-Badisi (Arabic: أبو يعقوب البادسي) was a 14th century Moroccan saint and savant. Ibn Khaldun mentioned him as the last great Moroccan saint. He is buried outside the old town of Badis. According to Leo Africanus, his tomb had become a shrine, called Sidi Bu Yaqub, which is still venerated by the locals.
