= Abu'l-Hasan Ali ibn al-Furat =

Abbasid vizier and official (855–924)

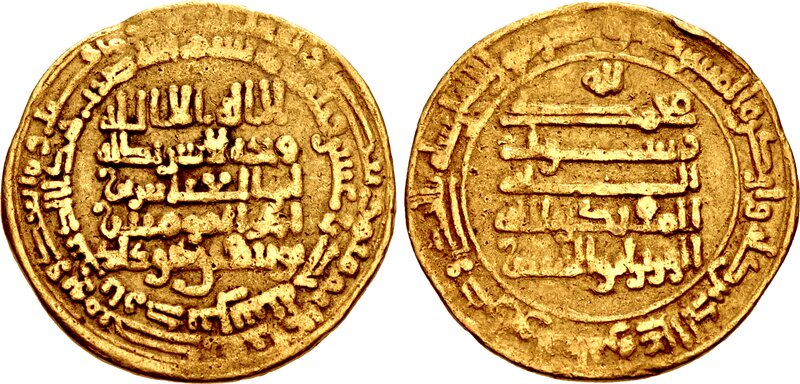
Gold dinar of the Sajid amir Yusuf ibn Abi'l-Saj (r. 901–928) citing the heir apparent Abu'l-Abbas, the vizier Abu'l-Hasan Ali ibn al-Furat, and Caliph al-Muqtadir

Abu'l-Hasan Ali ibn Muhammad ibn Musa ibn al-Hasan ibn al-Furat (Arabic: أبو الحسن علي بن محمد بن الفرات; 855 – 18 July 924) was a senior official of the Abbasid Caliphate who served three times as vizier under Caliph al-Muqtadir. Ali emerged into prominence as an able fiscal administrator and deputy to his older brother Ahmad. Eventually he came to lead one of the two major and rival court factions during al-Muqtadir's caliphate, the Banu'l-Furat, the other being the group of officials around the commander-in-chief Mu'nis al-Muzaffar and the vizier Ali ibn Isa al-Jarrah.

He played an important role in the selection of al-Muqtadir as caliph in 908, going on to serve as vizier in 908–912, during which time he succeeded in re-incorporating Fars into the Caliphate and restoring a measure of authority over the Sajids of Adharbayjan. After a second tenure in 917–918 he was imprisoned by his successor, and was released in 923, becoming vizier for the third and last time soon after. His brutality towards his rivals during his third tenure, coupled with military failures against the Qarmatians, caused his deposition and execution, along with his son al-Muhassin, on 18 July 924.

== Life ==
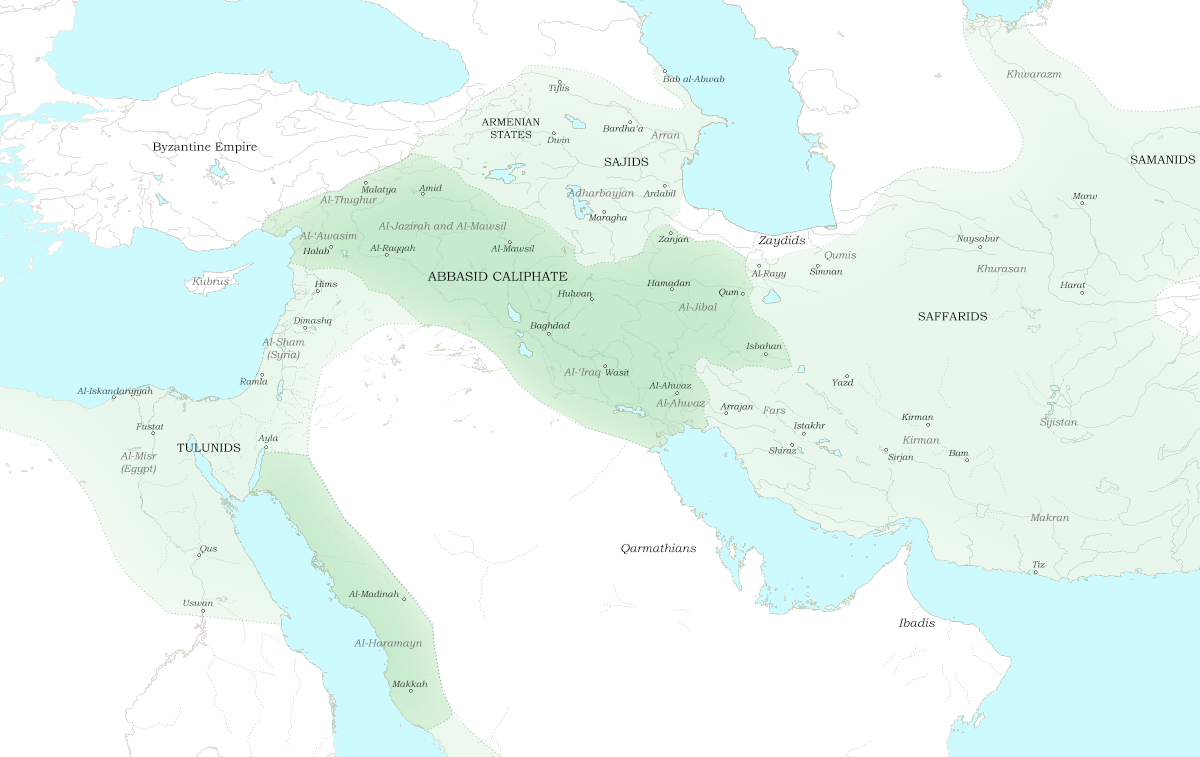
Map showing the Abbasid Caliphate after al-Mu'tadid's campaigns of consolidation, ca. 900: areas under direct Abbasid control in dark green, areas under loose Abbasid suzerainty, but under autonomous governors, in light green

Ali's family had been of some prominence at Baghdad already in the early 9th century, but it was his father Muhammad ibn Musa who first occupied an important administrative post. Ali began his career alongside his brother Ahmad during the late caliphate of al-Mu'tamid (reigned 870–892) and the regency of al-Muwaffaq. Both were protégés of the fellow Shi'ite Isma'il ibn Bulbul, who, after becoming vizier to both al-Mu'tamid and al-Muwaffaq in 885, brought them into the administration as fiscal experts and entrusted them with the department of land revenue of the Sawad. Following Ibn Bulbul's dismissal, Ahmad was imprisoned for a while, but at the accession of al-Mu'tadid (r. 892–902) in 892, he was released and entrusted once more with the fiscal department of the Sawad, and later of all the land tax departments, with Ali as his deputy.

The Ibn al-Furat brothers and their supporters came to form one of the two major groups that would dominate the Abbasid bureaucracy over the next decades, the Banu'l-Furat or Furatids. Their main rivals were another group of secretarial families, the Banu'l-Jarrah or Jarrahids, headed by Muhammad ibn Dawud and his nephew Ali ibn Isa al-Jarrah, who replaced the Banu'l-Furat as heads of the fiscal departments in 899. The two groups represented simply different factions in a struggle for office and power, but there are indications of "ideological" differences as well: many of the Banu'l-Jarrah families hailed from converted Nestorian families and employed Christians in the bureaucracy, in addition to maintaining closer ties with the military, while the Banu'l-Furat tried to impose firm civilian control of the army and (not quite openly) favoured Shi'ism. The rivalry between the two groups was intense but mostly restrained as their fortunes shifted repeatedly, but torture and the forced confiscation of a deposed official's possessions were commonplace under the old-established system known as muṣādara, which forced deposed officials to return the money they had embezzled; in effect, however, it practically forced officials to embezzle while in office so as to be able to provide the requisite sums during the muṣādara inquest.

The two brothers continued to serve as heads of the fiscal departments in the caliphate of al-Muktafi (r. 902–908). After his brother's death in 904, Ali became the chief aide to the vizier al-Abbas ibn al-Hasan al-Jarjara'i. The death of al-Muktafi in 908 left the issue of the succession open, and the vizier al-Abbas sought the advice of the most important bureaucrats on the choice of a successor. Following Ali's advice, the senior bureaucrats opted for al-Muktafi's 13-year-old brother Ja'far, who was seen as weak, pliable, and easy to manipulate by the senior officials. The choice of al-Muqtadir (r. 908–932) was, in the words of historian Hugh N. Kennedy, "a sinister development" and inaugurated one "of the most disastrous reigns in the whole of Abbasid history [...] a quarter of a century in which all of the work of [al-Muqtadir's] predecessors would be undone". Following the abortive coup by the supporters of Ibn al-Mu'tazz on 17 December, on 19 December 908 Ali was himself appointed vizier.

His first tenure as vizier was one of near absolute authority, with only a small group of palace officials, the caliph's mother and some court eunuchs, providing some checks to his authority, and this only from a distance. Among the successes of the period were the recovery of Fars, and the recognition of Abbasid suzerainty by the Sajid ruler of Adharbayjan, Yusuf ibn Abi'l-Saj, in exchange for a—rather modest—annual tribute of 120,000 dirhams. Grateful for the settlement, Yusuf henceforth considered Ali his protector, and even included his name in his coinage.

Soon, however, Ali began to abuse his power and embezzle large sums from the treasury, which led to his dismissal and arrest on 21 July 912. He was replaced by Muhammad ibn Ubayd Allah al-Khaqani. He was re-appointed to the vizierate on 3 June 917, succeeding his old rival Ali ibn Isa, but his second tenure was troubled by the rebellion of Yusuf, who had begun withholding the tribute to Baghdad and had seized a number of Samanid-ruled provinces in north-western Iran. Ali tried to intercede on Yusuf's behalf, but to no avail: he was dismissed in November 918, and Yusuf was defeated and taken prisoner to Baghdad by the Abbasid commander-in-chief, Mu'nis al-Muzaffar, in 919. Ali's successor was Hamid ibn al-Abbas, an ambitious man, but already over eighty years old and utterly unfamiliar with administrative affairs. During his vizierate, real power was exercised by his deputy, who was none other than Ali ibn Isa. Ali remained imprisoned in the caliphal palace throughout the period, being released only after Ibn al-Abbas's dismissal in 923 and was re-appointed to the vizierate for a third and final time on 7 August.

Ali's last tenure, from August 923 to June 924 is unanimously condemned by Arab historians as a dark period, the "year of destruction". Instead of treating his deposed rivals with clemency, as he had during his previous two tenures, Ali, assisted by his son al-Muhassin, seized the opportunity to avenge himself on anyone who had wronged him, and liberally employed violence to extort large sums from those appointed to office under Hamid. To further bolster his own position, he sent the powerful Mu'nis al-Muzaffar to semi-exile in Raqqa. The government's authority was further undermined by the sudden and dramatic resurgence of the Qarmatian threat, with the Sack of Basra in 923 and the destruction of the returning caravan of Hajj pilgrims in April/May the next year. Unable to stop nor to effectively respond to these attacks, Ali's popularity among the populace plummeted, leading to riots in Baghdad. At the same time, his brutality caused resentment among the bureaucracy and the financial straits of the Caliphate meant that he could not pay the army's salaries regularly. As a result, increasing pressure was put on the Caliph by members of the court and the military to act. Finally, in early June 924 al-Muqtadir had Ali and his son arrested. Al-Muqtadir retained much sympathy for the man who had been his mentor, and whose intelligence and ability he respected, but when the former vizier and his son were brought before the Caliph to stand trial, Ali lost whatever goodwill he retained by his insolent attitude. Ali and al-Muhassin were promptly executed on 18 July 924.

Of the mighty Banu'l-Furat, Ali's nephew al-Fadl managed to regain high office after 927, even serving as vizier briefly in 932 and in 937.

== Character and assessment ==
Ali ibn al-Furat was a complex personality. Well-educated and highly cultured, he was very intelligent and remarkably eloquent. He distinguished himself as an extremely able fiscal administrator, "committed to the reform of abuse and the raising of state revenues without oppression" (Hugh Kennedy) and able to "solve rapidly what appeared to be the most complicated problems" (Dominique Sourdel). As a courtier, he exercised power in the style of a "grand seigneur" (Kennedy), having an affinity for luxury and dispensing extravagant largesse on his followers to enhance his own image. At the same time, his primary loyalty was not to the state or the caliph, but to the advancement and enrichment of himself and his followers, which formed almost a Twelver Shia "secret politicoreligious party" (Sourdel) within the heart of the Sunni Caliphate. Furthermore, despite combating corruption in others, he was not above breaking the law for his own profit and was "to an extent ruthless and unscrupulous when it came to furthering his own interests" (Kennedy).

== Sources ==
- Bonner, Michael (2010). "The waning of empire, 861–945". In Robinson, Chase F. (ed.). The New Cambridge History of Islam, Volume 1: The Formation of the Islamic World, Sixth to Eleventh Centuries. Cambridge: Cambridge University Press. pp. 305–359. ISBN 978-0-521-83823-8.
- Bowen, Harold (1928). The Life and Times of ʿAlí Ibn ʿÍsà, ‘The Good Vizier’. Cambridge: Cambridge University Press.
- Bosworth, C.E. (1975). "The Ṭāhirids and Ṣaffārids". In Frye, Richard N. (ed.). The Cambridge History of Iran: From the Arab Invasion to the Saljuqs. Vol. 4. Cambridge: Cambridge University Press. pp. 90–135. ISBN 0-521-20093-8.
- Kennedy, Hugh (2004) [1986]. The Prophet and the Age of the Caliphates: The Islamic Near East from the 6th to the 11th Century (Second ed.). Harlow: Longman. ISBN 978-0-582-40525-7.
- Madelung, W. (1975). "The Minor Dynasties of Northern Iran". In Frye, Richard N. (ed.). The Cambridge History of Iran: From the Arab Invasion to the Saljuqs. Vol. 4. Cambridge: Cambridge University Press. pp. 198–249. ISBN 0-521-20093-8.
- Sourdel, D. (1971). "Ibn al-Furāt". In Lewis, B.; Ménage, V. L.; Pellat, Ch. & Schacht, J. (eds.). The Encyclopaedia of Islam, Second Edition. Volume III: H–Iram. Leiden: E. J. Brill. pp. 767–768. doi:10.1163/1573-3912_islam_COM_0322. OCLC 495469525.
- van Berkel, Maaike; El Cheikh, Nadia Maria; Kennedy, Hugh; Osti, Letizia (2013). Crisis and Continuity at the Abbasid Court: Formal and Informal Politics in the Caliphate of al-Muqtadir (295-320/908-32). Leiden: BRILL. ISBN 978-90-04-25271-4.

Preceded by al-Abbas ibn al-Hasan al-Jarjara'i	Vizier of the Abbasid Caliphate; 19 December 908 – 21 July 912	Succeeded by Muhammad ibn Ubayd Allah al-Khaqani
Preceded by Ali ibn Isa al-Jarrah	Vizier of the Abbasid Caliphate; 3 June 917 – 17 November 918	Succeeded by Hamid ibn al-Abbas
Preceded by Hamid ibn al-Abbas	Vizier of the Abbasid Caliphate; 7 August 923 – 15 June 924	Succeeded by Abdallah al-Khaqani
