= Abd al-Haqq al-Badisi =

Abd al-Haqq ibn Ismail al-Badisi (Arabic: عبدالحق بن إسماعيل الباديسي; died after 1322) was a Moroccan biographer, author of Al-Maqsad al-sharif wa-al-manza al-latif fi tarif bi sulaha al-rif (The exalted resolve and the subtle object of the naming of the venerable inhabitants of the Rif), a book about the life of 48 Sufi saints of the Rif.
