= Muhammad ibn al-Qasim (vizier) =

Abbasid Vizier (July 933–October 933)

Muhammad ibn al-Qasim محمد بن القاسم
- Born: Abbasid Caliphate
- Died: Baghdad, Abbasid Caliphate
- Other names: Ibn al-Qasim
- Occupation: Abbasid vizier
- Years active: July 933 – October 933 (under al-Qahir)
- Father: Al-Qasim ibn Ubayd Allah
- Relatives: Al-Husayn ibn al-Qasim (brother)

Muhammad ibn al-Qasim (Arabic: محمد بن القاسم) was an official of the Abbasid Caliphate who served briefly as vizier in July–October 933 under Caliph al-Qahir (r. 932–934). He hailed from a family of Nestorian Christian origin that had served in the caliphal bureaucracy since late Umayyad times, and was the son, grandson, great-grandson and brother of viziers.

== Sources ==
- Bosworth, C.E. (2002). "Wahb". In Bearman, P. J.; Bianquis, Th.; Bosworth, C. E.; van Donzel, E. & Heinrichs, W. P. (eds.). The Encyclopaedia of Islam, Second Edition. Volume XI: W–Z. Leiden: E. J. Brill. pp. 33–34. ISBN 978-90-04-12756-2.
- Sourdel, Dominique (1960). Le vizirat abbâside de 749 à 936 (132 à 324 de l'hégire) [Abbasid vizierate from 749 to 936 (132-324)] (in French). Vol. II. Damascus: Institut français de Damas. pp. 475–478.
