= Mohamed Hajji =

Moroccan historian

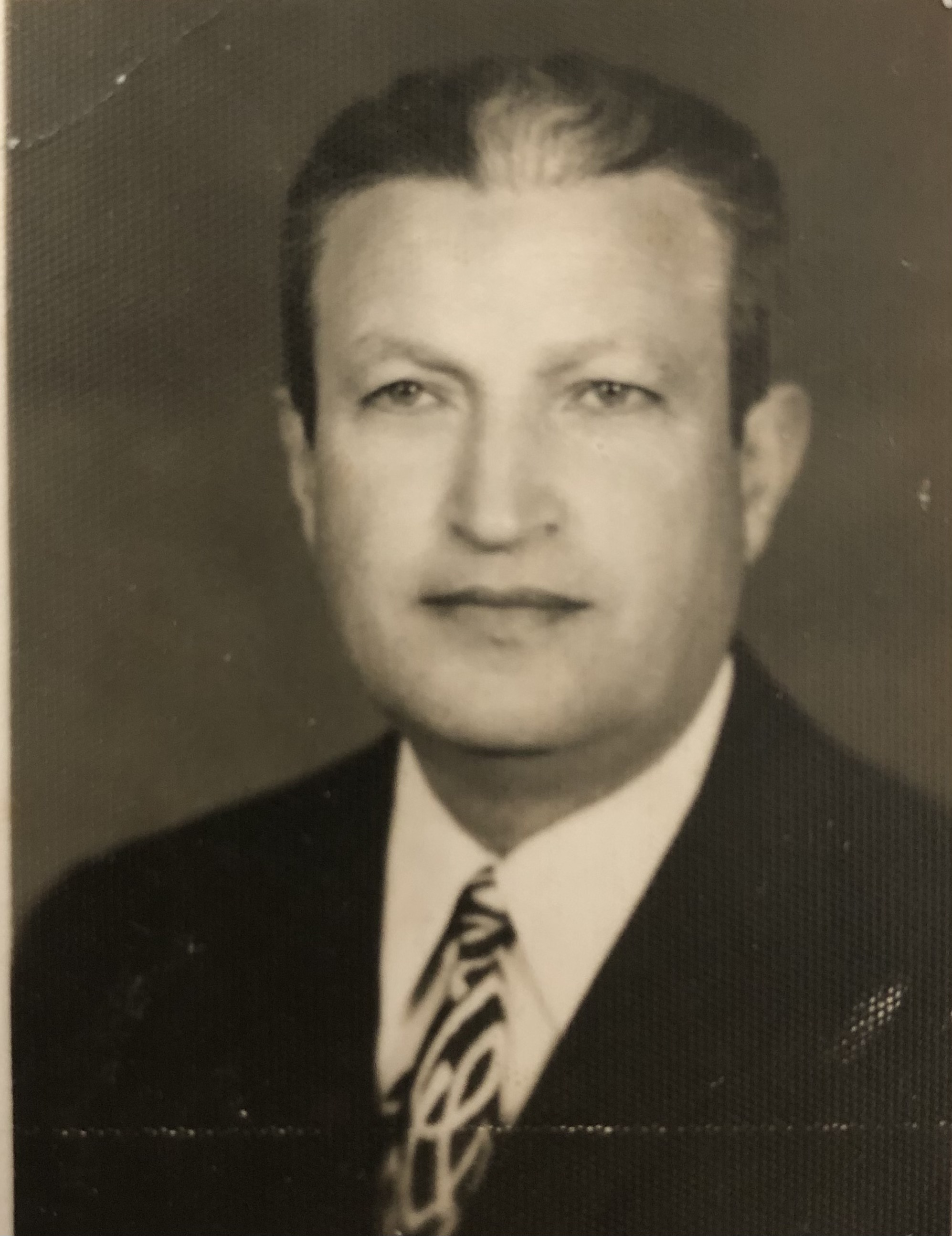
- Born: Salé, Morocco
- Died: Salé, Morocco

Mohamed Hajji (1923 in Salé, Morocco - 2003; Arabic: محمد حجي) was a Moroccan historian, encyclopaedist, writer, scholar and a university professor. The author of some forty books, he is particularly famous for his encyclopedia Ma'lamat al-Maghrib, the work of his life.

== Biography ==
=== Early life and education ===
Mohamed was born in Salé, Morocco in 1923 to the Hajji family. After studying Quran, Fiqh, Arabic language, astronomy and Sīrah under ulama like: al-Jilani an-najjar, fqih zin al-Abidin ibn Abud, Hajj Mohamed sbihi, Abu Bakr Zniber, shaykh al-Islam Mohammed Belarbi Alaoui and Abd ar-Rahman ibn Shuayb ad-dukkali. He followed a regular course at the Institut des Hautes Études Marocaines in 1958, culminating in a diploma in classical Arabic and Translation. In 1961, Mohamed obtained an undergraduate degree in Arabic language and literature from the Faculty of Letters and Human sciences of Rabat and a diploma of higher studies in history from the same Faculty in 1963. In 1976, he obtained a doctorate in letters and human sciences from the Sorbonne in Paris.

=== Career ===
From 1943 to 1944 he taught at the M'hamed Guessous school in Rabat. He was the founding director of the private school of the Young Slaoui girl from 1945 to 1948. From 1949 to 1956 he worked as a public education teacher at the College d'Azrou then at the Regional School of Teachers of Rabat. He worked as teacher at the Lycée Moulay Youssef in Rabat from 1956 to 1957 and from 1957 to 1959 he was the director of the regional School of Teachers in Marrakech. From 1959 to 1961, Mohamed worked as a teacher of Arabic then regional inspector of primary education in Rabat. From 1961 to 1962, he held the position of principal inspector at the Ministry of National Education. He also acted as the ministry's delegate in Casablanca from 1961 to 1964. From 1964 to 1967, he occupied the position of head of the research and educational action at the Ministry of National Education. He joined the Faculty of Letters and Human Sciences in Rabat, where he served in various roles from 1967 to 1979; assistant, lecturer and assistant professor. He served as dean of the Faculty of Letters of Rabat from 1979 to 1981, before being director of the Royal College from 1982 to 1984.

== Works ==
He wrote some forty works some of them are:

=== Books by Hajji ===
- al-Zāwiyah al-Dilāʼīyah wa-dawruhā al-dīnī wa-al-ʻilmī wa-al-siyāsī. 1988 [First published 1964].
- L'activité intellectuelle au Maroc à l'époque sa'dide. 1976.
  - al-Ḥarakah al-fikrīyah bi-al-Maghrib fī ʻahd al-Saʻdīyīn. 1976.
- Turath al-Andalus: Takshif wa-Taqwim. 1993.
- A'lamun Maghriba Lahum 'alaqa bi lbahr. 1998.

=== Editing work ===
- Fihris Aḥmad al-Manǧūr
- al-Wansharisi, Ahmad. Alf sanah min al-wafayāt fī thalāth kutub.
- al-Wansharisi, Ahmad (1981). al-miʻyār al-Mughrib wa-'l-Jāmiʻ al-Maġrib ʻan fatāwī ahl Ifrīqīya wa-'l-Andalus wa-'l-Maġrib.
- al-Qadiri, Mohammed (1986). Hajji, Mohamed; Toufiq, Ahmed (eds.). Nashr al-mathānī li-ahl al-qarn al-ḥādī ʻashar wa-al-thānī.
- Ibn Rushd al-Jadd (1987). al-Bayān wa-'t-taḥṣīl wa-'š-šarḥ wa-'t-tauǧīḥ wa-'t-taʻlīl fī masā'il al-mustaḫraǧa.
- al-Qarafi, Shihab al-Din (1994). al-Dhakhirah fi Usul al-Fiqh.

=== Translations ===
- Wasf Ifriqiya
- Ifriqya
- Fas Qabl al-Himaya
- Tarikh ash-shurafa'. 1988.
- Rihlat al-'asir Moüette. 1990.
