= Amir al-umara =

Senior military position in the 10th-century Abbasid Caliphate

The office of amir al-umara (Arabic: أمير الأمراء, romanized: amīr al-umarāʾ), variously rendered in English as emir of emirs, prince of princes, chief emir, and commander of commanders, was a senior military position in the 10th-century Abbasid Caliphate, whose holders in the decade after 936 came to supersede the civilian bureaucracy under the vizier and become effective regents, relegating the Abbasid caliphs to a purely ceremonial role. The office then formed the basis for the Buyid control over the Abbasid caliphs and over Iraq until the mid-11th century.

The title continued in use by Muslim states in the Middle East, but was mostly restricted to senior military leaders. It was also used in Norman Sicily for a few of the king's chief ministers.

== In the Abbasid Caliphate ==
=== Background ===
The first person to be titled amir al-umara was the commander Harun ibn Gharib, a cousin of the Caliph al-Muqtadir (r. 908–932), in 928. He was followed soon after by his rival, the eunuch Mu'nis al-Muzaffar (845–933), who served as commander-in-chief of the caliphal army and the power behind the throne for most of al-Muqtadir's reign. From 928, Mu'nis was involved in a tumultuous power struggle with his rivals in the court's civilian bureaucracy, which ended with the deposition and execution of al-Muqtadir in 932, and his replacement with his brother al-Qahir (r. 932–934). Mu'nis and the military were now dominant in the affairs of the Abbasid court, beginning a period of troubles that was, in the words of the historian Hugh Kennedy, "dominated by the struggles of military men to control the caliphate and, perhaps more importantly, the revenues of the Sawad which would enable them to satisfy the demands of their followers".

Mu'nis himself was executed by al-Qahir in 933, but in 934 another palace coup deposed al-Qahir and replaced him with al-Radi (r. 934–940). The frequent coups and violent struggle for control of the Caliphate greatly enfeebled the central government in Baghdad. Effective control over the Maghreb and Khurasan had long been lost, but now autonomous rulers emerged in the provinces closer to Iraq: Egypt and Bilad al-Sham were ruled by the Ikhshidid dynasty, the Hamdanid dynasty had secured control over Upper Mesopotamia, and most of Iran was ruled by Daylamite dynasties, among whom the Buyids were most prominent. Even in Iraq itself, the authority of the caliphal government was challenged. Thus in the south, around Basra, Abu Abdallah al-Baridi established his own domain, often refusing to send tax revenues to Baghdad and establishing contacts with the Buyids of nearby Fars. The historian Ali ibn al-Athir (d. 1233) asserted that after the death of Mu'nis, the post of amir al-umara fell to Tarif al-Subkari, who was also head of the treasury.

=== Elevation to regent ===
Finally, in November 936, the failure of the vizier Ibn Muqla to control the provincial governors and confront the disastrous financial situation of the Caliphate, led to the appointment of the governor of Wasit, Muhammad ibn Ra'iq, to the position of amir al-umara. The authority granted to Ibn Ra'iq and his successors was sweeping. According to the contemporary scholar Miskawayh, he was named governor of Baghdad and commander-in-chief of the army, was entrusted with the collection of the kharaj land tax and the supervision of all public estates, as well as the maintenance of security. He was also granted a banner and robes of office, as well as the privileges of being addressed by his kunya (teknonymic), and his name added to the caliph's during the Friday prayer. In effect, writes Miskawayh, the caliph "resigned to him the government of the kingdom". Henceforth, effective power in both military and civil administrations passed from the caliph to the amir al-umara and his secretary, who ran the civilian administration. Ibn Ra'iq took care to deprive the caliph of his last support base by disbanding the old household bodyguard, replacing them as the core of the caliphal army with his own Turks and Daylamites.

=== Struggle for power, 936–946 ===
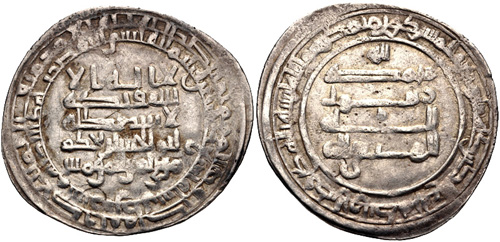
Silver dirham of 940/941 CE, with the names of Caliph al-Muttaqi and the amir al-umara Bajkam

Despite his extraordinary authority, however, Ibn Ra'iq failed to stabilize the situation and a decade-long complicated power struggle between various regional leaders followed for the office of amir al-umara. On 9 September 938 Ibn Ra'iq was deposed by his former subordinate, the Turk Bajkam, who secured his own succession to the post four days later, and ruled until his death at the hands of Kurdish brigands on 21 April 941. Caliph al-Muttaqi (r. 940–944), raised to the throne by Bajkam after al-Radi's death, now tried to restore civilian rule, appointing Ibn Maymun and then Abu Abdallah al-Baridi as viziers, but the military retook control under the leadership of Kurankij, who became amir al-umara on 1 July.

He was deposed on 16 September by Ibn Ra'iq, who within a few days re-assumed his old position. However, Ibn Ra'iq's restoration provoked the reaction of al-Baridi, whose forces occupied Baghdad, forcing Ibn Ra'iq and al-Muttaqi to flee to the Hamdanid ruler al-Hasan in Mosul. The latter helped the Caliph recover Baghdad, had Ibn Ra'iq assassinated on 13 February 942, and assumed the position of amir al-umara himself on 18 February, with the laqab (honorific title) of Nasir al-Dawla. The Hamdanids too were unable to consolidate their control in the face of financial difficulties, and a military revolt under the Turkish general Tuzun forced Nasir al-Dawla to abandon his post (11 May 943) and retreat to his base at Mosul. Tuzun became the new amir al-umara that year.

Al-Muttaqi tried to regain his independence by remaining at Raqqa instead of Baghdad and contacting the Ikhshidids, who encouraged him to seek refuge in Egypt. In the end, al-Muttaqi refused and returned to Baghdad, where Tuzun deposed and blinded him, raising al-Mustakfi (r. 944–946) to the throne. Tuzun's tenure lasted until his death in August/September 945, but was overshadowed by the rising power of the Buyids. After Tuzun's death, his secretary and successor, Muhammad ibn Shirzad, held only feeble authority and tried to fend off the Buyid threat by allying himself with Nasir al-Dawla. His efforts were in vain, and on 17 January 946, the Buyids under Mu'izz al-Dawla entered Baghdad. This began the Buyid era in Baghdad and Iraq, which lasted until the Seljuk conquest in the mid-11th century.

=== Under the Buyids ===
Possession of the title of amir al-umara formed the institutional framework of Buyid authority in Baghdad itself and vis-a-vis the caliph, who now became simply another state functionary and was given an annual salary. Although Ahmad ibn Buya had seized Baghdad, the strong family ties of the Buyid brothers determined their respective positions with each other, and the post of amir al-umara fell to the elder brother and ruler of Fars, Ali, known by his laqab Imad al-Dawla. After his death in 949 he was succeeded by the eldest surviving brother, Rukn al-Dawla, ruler of Rey, until his death in 976. It appears, however, that Ahmad (Mu'izz al-Dawla), who continued to rule over Iraq, also retained the title for himself, and gave it in addition to his son Izz al-Dawla when he declared him his heir in 955. In response, Rukn al-Dawla's son and heir 'Adud al-Dawla (r. 976–983) began to assume titles of sovereignty in Persian fashion, like shahanshah ("shah of shahs"), malik ("king"), or malik al-muluk ("king of kings"), to underline his pre-eminence. Thus, under the later Buyid rulers, Persian titles were more prominent, and amir al-umara came to denote the designated heir-apparent. In general, Buyid use of the title appears to have been inconsistent, and it was employed more as an honorific rather than an office.

== In other Muslim states ==
=== Iran and Khurasan ===
Further east, neither the Samanid Empire nor the Ghaznavids appear to have employed it often, except for the case of Abu Ali Simjuri, a rebel military commander who took control of Khorasan in 991 and proclaimed himself amir al-umara. Later Muslim dynasties, whether Iranian or Turkish, used the title mostly in a military context, although not always associated with the command-in-chief of the army. Thus the Seljuk Turks, who overran the former lands of the Caliphate in the later 11th century, used it as one among many designations for senior military commanders (ispahsalar, amir-i salar, muqaddam al-'askar, etc.). Only two instances are known where the title was held by princes of the dynasty as a mark of distinction: Osman, a son of Chaghri Beg, who in 1073 was named governor of northern Afghanistan, and Muhammad, a grandson of Chaghri Beg, who in 1097 rebelled in Khorasan against his nephew, Sultan Barkiyaruq (r. 1094–1105).

In the Safavid Iran, the title was initially of considerable importance, as it was held by the commander-in-chief of the Qizilbash forces that formed the mainstay of Safavid regime. In the time when Husayn Beg Shamlu occupied the office in 1501–1510, he was the most powerful state official, but after his fall it fell in importance and lost much power, particularly to the qurčibaši, the commanders of the Turkmen tribal cavalry. The amir al-umara enjoyed a revival in the period of Qizilbash tutelage over Tahmasp I in 1524–1533, but thereafter disappears almost completely. It only reappeared occasionally in the late Safavid period, when it designated a military commander exceptionally appointed to a border region threatened with foreign invasion.

=== Mamluks and Ottomans ===
The title was also, albeit rarely, used by the Mamluk Sultanate centered in Cairo, apparently associated with the commander of the army (atabak al-'asakir), but also appears to have been given to other amirs. In the Ottoman Empire, emīrü’l-umerā was used, along with the Persian equivalent mir-i miran, as a translation of beylerbey ("bey of beys").

== In Norman Sicily ==
As a result of the long period of Arab rule in Sicily, the Italo-Norman Kingdom of Sicily continued the use of many Arabic terms in its administration, among which was 'emir' (am[m]iratus in Latin, ἀμηρᾶς in Greek, the other two languages in official use), whose holders combined military and civilian authority. Among the most prominent of these was a Greek Christian known as George of Antioch, who as the most powerful official of Roger II of Sicily (r. 1130–1154) fulfilled the duties of chief minister to Roger and was given the titles of 'grand emir' (magnus amiratus, μέγας ἀμηρᾶς) and 'emir of emirs' (amiratus amiratorum, ἀμηρᾶς τῶν ἀμηράδων). The title lapsed after his death c. 1152, until it was awarded in 1154 by William I of Sicily (r. 1154–1166) to Maio of Bari, who held it until his assassination in 1160. The last ammiratus ammiratorum was Margaritus of Brindisi who held the title until the collapse of Hauteville dynasty in 1194. It is from these individuals that the corrupted form "admiral" began to be used in the western Mediterranean for naval commanders in the 13th century.
