= Ma'lamat al-Maghrib =

Moroccan encyclopedia (1989–present)

- Editors: Mohamed Hajji; Ahmed Toufiq
- Original title: معلمة المغرب
- Language: Arabic
- Publication date: 1989–present
- Publication place: Morocco

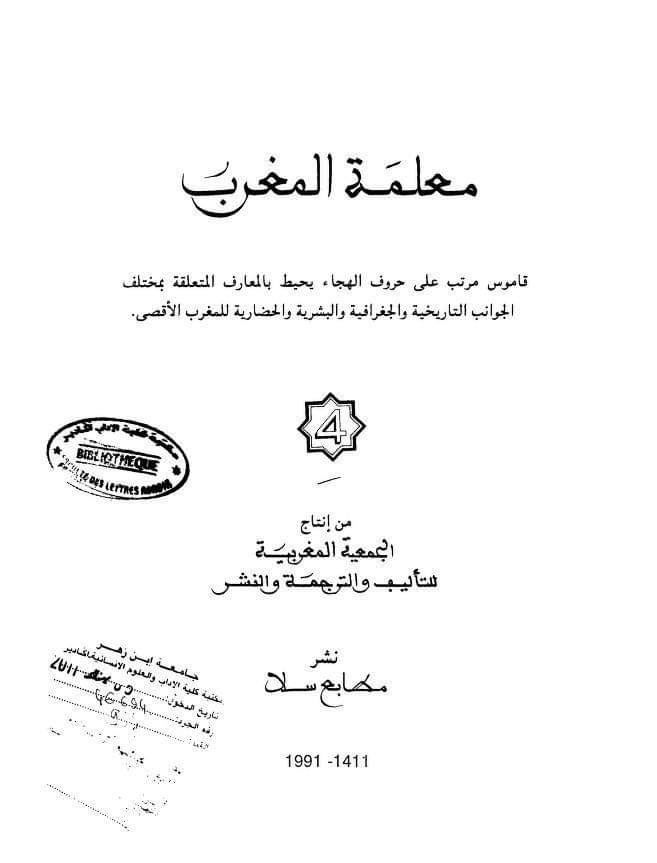
Maʿlamāt al-Maghrib cover

Maʿlamāt al-Maghrib (Arabic: معلمة المغرب, lit. 'Encyclopedia of Morocco') is an encyclopedia of Morocco produced by the Moroccan Association for Composition, Translation, and Publication (الجمعية المغربية للتأليف والترجمة والنشر) and its publication was begun in 1989 by Salé Press. Its completion was overseen by the historian Muhammad Hajji. It was edited by Mohamed Hajji and Ahmed Toufiq.

Contributors in the human sciences included Mohamed Benchrifa, Mohammed Zniber, Sālim Yafūt, and Mustafa Na'mi.
