= Banu'l-Furat =

The Banu'l-Furat (Arabic: بنو الفرات) were a Shia family of civil functionaries of the Abbasid Caliphate in the late 9th and early 10th centuries, several of whom held the office of vizier. In the sources, the members of the family are often simply designated as Ibn al-Furat. Along with their rivals, the Banu'l-Jarrah, they controlled the Caliphate's central government in the early decades of the 10th century.

The most notable members of the family were:

- Abu'l-Abbas Ahmad ibn Muhammad ibn Musa ibn al-Hasan ibn al-Furat (died 904), chief fiscal minister of the caliphs al-Mu'tadid and al-Muktafi until his death.
- Abu'l-Hasan Ali ibn Muhammad ibn Musa ibn al-Hasan ibn al-Furat (855–924), originally deputy of his brother Ahmad, vizier in 908–912, 917–918 and 923–924. Deposed and executed with his son al-Muhassin due to their abuse of power in July 924.
- Abu'l-Khattab Ja'far ibn Muhammad ibn Musa ibn al-Hasan ibn al-Furat (died 909/10), head of the land department of East and West from 908 to his death.
- Abu'l-Fath al-Fadl ibn Ja'far ibn al-Furat (died 938), held several posts in the fiscal ministries of land revenue, vizier for a few months in 932 and in 937. Last vizier of Caliph al-Muqtadir-billah. He was also vizier of the caliph al-Radi.
- Abu'l-Fadl Ja'far ibn al-Fadl ibn al-Furat (921–1001), also known as Ibn Hinzaba. Vizier of the Ikhshidids of Egypt, he headed the administration during the last years before the Fatimid conquest of the country.

== Sources ==
- Kennedy, Hugh (2004). The Prophet and the Age of the Caliphates: The Islamic Near East from the 6th to the 11th Century (Second ed.). Harlow: Longman. ISBN 978-0-582-40525-7.
- Sourdel, D. (1971). "Ibn al-Furāt". In Lewis, B.; Ménage, V. L.; Pellat, Ch. & Schacht, J. (eds.). The Encyclopaedia of Islam, Second Edition. Volume III: H–Iram. Leiden: E. J. Brill. pp. 767–768. doi:10.1163/1573-3912_islam_COM_0322. OCLC 495469525.
- Abdullah Burgu, Vizier Ibn al-Furât and His Family During the Collapse of Abbasids (PhD thesis under preparation, Selcuk University)
