= Ali ibn Isa ibn al-Jarrah =

10th-century official of the Abbasid Caliphate (859–946)

ʿAlī ibn ʿĪsā ibn Dā'ūd ibn al-Jarrāḥ (859 – 1 August 946), was an official of the court of the Abbasid Caliphate.

Born in Dayr Qunna and descended from a family with a long history of service in the Abbasid government, he rose to power in the Abbasid court, serving as vizier from 913–917, and 927–928 as well as de facto during the vizierate of Hamid ibn al-Abbas from 918–923.

Ali ibn Isa's political career, coinciding with the terminal decline of the Abbasid state, was turbulent, marked by a power struggle with his rival Abu'l-Hasan Ali ibn al-Furat and his supporters, resulting in frequent periods of exile. In contrast to the largesse and extravagance of Ibn al-Furat, Ali ibn Isa was austere and a determined opponent of corruption, which earned him many enemies. Nevertheless, he was later remembered as the "good vizier" for his administrative talent and honesty.

He died on the night of 1 August 946 in a sack of Baghdad by Daylamites led by Mu'izz al-Dawla.

Preceded by Muhammad ibn Ubayd Allah al-Khaqani	Vizier of the Abbasid Caliphate; 16 August 913 – 2 June 917	Succeeded by Abu'l-Hasan Ali ibn al-Furat
Preceded by Abu'l-Hasan Ali ibn al-Furat	De facto Vizier of the Abbasid Caliphate; De jure Hamid ibn al-Abbas; 22 November 918 – 7 August 923	Succeeded by Abu'l-Hasan Ali ibn al-Furat
Preceded by Ahmad al-Khasibi	Vizier of the Abbasid Caliphate; 13 April 927 – 6 May 928	Succeeded by Ibn Muqla
