= Vizier (Abbasid Caliphate) =

High position of the Abbasid Caliph

Vizier of the Abbasid Caliph
- وزير
- Residence: Madīnat as-Salām (Baghdad); Raqqa; Samarra; Baghdad
- Appointer: Abbasid Caliphs
- Term length: ad hoc
- Formation: c. 780
- First holder: Ya'qub
- Final holder: Ibn al-Alkami
- Abolished: 20 February 1258

The vizier (Arabic: وزير, romanized: wazīr) was the senior minister of the Abbasid Caliphate, and set a model that was widely emulated in the Muslim world. Many viziers came to enjoy considerable power, even at times eclipsing the Abbasid caliphs and using them as puppets. The majority of the viziers were of non-Arab origin, and several were also notable patrons of poets and scholars, sponsoring the Translation Movement as well as religious works.

== History ==
The term wazīr originally meant 'helper', and appears in this sense in the Quran. It was later adopted as a title, in the form of wazīr āl Muḥammad (lit. 'Helper of the Family of Muhammad') by the proto-Shi'a leaders al-Mukhtar and Abu Salama. Under the Abbasid caliphs, the term acquired the meaning of 'representative' or 'deputy'.

=== Early period ===
The exact origins of the office of vizier are not entirely clear. Some historians have suggested that it should be traced to pre-Islamic practices in Sasanian Persia (cf. wuzurg framadār), but others have stressed an independent evolution in the Arab-Islamic world, from the position of secretarial scribe (kātib) to that of royal councillor. The matter is confused further by the anachronistic application of the term to early Abbasid officials by later historians. In addition, historians often applied the term to important ministers who did not formally hold the actual office.

The first to have actually held the title may have been Ya'qub ibn Dawud under Caliph al-Mahdi (r. 775–785). The early history of the office was dominated by the Iranian Barmakid family, which held unparalleled authority during most of the reign of Harun al-Rashid (r. 786–809). The Barmakids distinguished themselves by their power, generosity, and the extent of their patronage, but are mostly remembered for their abrupt downfall in 803, possibly as the Caliph felt threatened by their power.

During the civil war between Harun al-Rashid's sons al-Amin (r. 809–813) and al-Ma'mun (r. 813–833), two viziers played a major role. Al-Fadl ibn al-Rabi, who had served Harun al-Rashid as vizier, was among the leading voices in persuading al-Amin to try and disinherit his brother leading to the outbreak of the civil war. On the other side, al-Ma'mun relied on his own favourite, al-Fadl ibn Sahl, a former Barmakid protégé, who became all-powerful after al-Ma'mun's victory and whose name appeared even on coins, with the style Dhu'l-Ri'āsatayn ('He of the Two Headships'), signifying his authority over both civilian and military affairs.

Ibn Sahl's power led to his assassination in 818, and after that, al-Ma'mun was careful not to allow any official to have such extensive authority. For most of his reign, it was the chief qāḍī, Ahmad ibn Abi Du'ad, who was the most influential figure in the administration, resulting in considerable rivalry between the latter and the viziers of the period.

=== Crisis of the Abbasid empire and the apogee of the vizierate ===
The introduction of the Turkish slave-soldiers (ghilmān) by al-Ma'mun's successor al-Mu'tasim (r. 833–842), and the power they quickly accumulated, led to a rivalry between the Turkish commanders and the civilian viziers over control of revenue. The decline and territorial fragmentation of the Abbasid empire following the "Anarchy at Samarra" in the 860s, and the pressing need for revenue led to the entrusting of the vizierate to financial experts, especially the two great bureaucratic families of the Banu'l-Furat and the Banu'l-Jarrah, who emerged during the caliphate of al-Mu'tadid (r. 892–902) and between them dominated the vizierate and the Abbasid government for over a generation.

The years between 908 and 936 mark the apogee of vizieral power, a period that the modern historian of the Abbasid vizierate, Dominique Sourdel, called its "grande époque". However, the period was also marked by the bitter rivalry between the Banu'l-Furat and the Banu'l-Jarrah, and their respective clients, which developed into a fierce factionalism: the fall of a vizier from one faction mean the dismissal of all junior officials of the same faction, followed by the newly ascendant faction fining and torturing their predecessors to extract money, according to the well-established practice known as muṣādara.

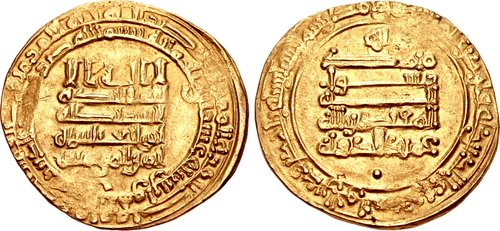
Gold dinar of Caliph al-Muqtadir with the names of his heir Abu'l-Abbas and the vizier Amid al-Dawla

The two groups represented primarily different factions in a struggle for office and power, but there are indications of what might be termed "ideological" differences as well: many of the Banu'l-Jarrah families hailed from converted Nestorian families and employed Christians in the bureaucracy, in addition to maintaining closer ties with the military, while the Banu'l-Furat tried to impose firm civilian control of the army and—albeit not quite openly—favoured Shi'ism. The leading figures of this period stand in marked contrast in the sources: Abu'l-Hasan Ali ibn al-Furat is known for his corruption and brutality, as well as his failure to confront the Qarmatians, while his rival, Ali ibn Isa ibn al-Jarrah, is universally remembered as the "good vizier" in Arabic historiography.

=== Collapse of the Abbasid empire and later period ===
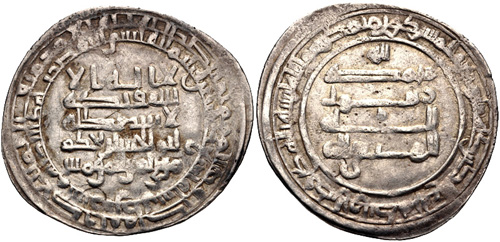
Abbasid Silver dirham of 940/941 CE, with the names of caliph al-Muttaqi and the amir al-umara Bajkam

In the end, the viziers were unable to halt the decline of the Abbasid state. The loss of provinces, coupled with the decline in productivity of the Sawad, reduced the income available to meet the extravagant expenditure of the caliphal court and the incessant need to pay the army, while the corruption and infighting within the administration hindered orderly government and reform efforts. These factors combined to effectively bankrupt the Abbasid government, leading to the appointment, in 936, of a military strongman, Ibn Ra'iq, to the position of amīr al-umarāʾ, combining the civilian authority of the vizier with that of a military commander-in-chief. This effectively put an end to the caliphs' power, reducing them to mere figureheads; for the next decade, a series of military strongmen competed for appointment to the title of amīr al-umarāʾ and control of the caliph. This process culminated in the capture of Baghdad in 946 by the Buyids, who put an end to caliphal independence even in name.

After 946, the Abbasid caliphs continued to have their own viziers, but it was the viziers of the new dynasties that dominated Iraq, the Buyids, and later the Seljuks, that exercised real power. These produced a number of illustrious figures like Abu'l-Fadl ibn al-Amid and Nizam al-Mulk. Under the Buyids, indeed, the caliphs did not formally have a vizier at all, but merely a 'secretary' (kātib), although chronicles often do not make the distinction; it was not until the reign of al-Qa'im (r. 1031–1075) that the chief ministers of the caliph assumed the title of vizier. After the decline of the Seljuks at the turn of the 12th century and the partial revival of the temporal power of the Abbasid caliphs, who once again came to rule over Iraq, the Abbasid vizierate also experienced a renaissance, in the hands of men like Awn al-Din ibn Hubayra and his son Izz al-Din.

== Sources ==
- Bonner, Michael (2010). "The waning of empire, 861–945". In Robinson, Chase F. (ed.). The New Cambridge History of Islam, Volume 1: The Formation of the Islamic World, Sixth to Eleventh Centuries. Cambridge: Cambridge University Press. pp. 305–359. ISBN 978-0-521-83823-8.
- Busse, Heribert (2004) [1969]. Chalif und Grosskönig - Die Buyiden im Irak (945-1055) [Caliph and Great King - The Buyids in Iraq (945-1055)] (in German). Würzburg: Ergon Verlag. ISBN 3-89913-005-7.
- Kennedy, Hugh (2004) [1986]. The Prophet and the Age of the Caliphates: The Islamic Near East from the 6th to the 11th Century (Second ed.). Harlow: Longman. ISBN 978-0-582-40525-7.
- van Berkel, Maaike (2013). "The Vizier". Crisis and Continuity at the Abbasid Court: Formal and Informal Politics in the Caliphate of al-Muqtadir (295-320/908-32). Leiden: Brill. pp. 65–86. ISBN 978-90-04-25271-4.
- Zaman, Muhammad Qasim (2002). "Wazīr. I. In the Arab World 1. The ʿAbbāsids.". In Bearman, P. J.; Bianquis, Th.; Bosworth, C. E.; van Donzel, E. & Heinrichs, W. P. (eds.). The Encyclopaedia of Islam, Second Edition. Volume XI: W–Z. Leiden: E. J. Brill. pp. 185–188. doi:10.1163/1573-3912_islam_COM_1346. ISBN 978-90-04-12756-2.
