= Ja'far ibn al-Furat =

10th-century Ikhshidid vizier of Egypt

Abu'l-Fadl Ja'far ibn al-Fadl ibn al-Furat (Arabic: أبو الفضل جعفر بن الفضل بن الفرات; 921 - 1001), also called Ibn Hinzaba, like his father before him, was a member of the bureaucratic Banu'l-Furat family from Iraq. A highly educated man renowned for his strict piety and knowledge of traditions about the early Islamic times, he served as vizier of the Ikhshidids of Egypt from 946 until the end of the dynasty in 969, and continued serving the Fatimid Caliphate after that.

Following the death of Abu'l-Misk Kafur in April 968, Ibn al-Furat was left as one of the most powerful leaders in the country. His lack of support outside the bureaucracy and his inability to restore orderly administration and security in a country plagued by years of famine and external attacks, mean that his position was weak and constantly challenged by other factions, especially the military. He was deposed and imprisoned by al-Hasan ibn Ubayd Allah ibn Tughj in November 968, but released and restored to his office when Hasan suddenly abandoned Egypt in February 969 and returned to Palestine. Ibn al-Furat remained vizier merely because no-one could agree on his replacement; faced with the impasse, the Egyptian elites, influenced by long and persistent Fatimid propaganda, began to accept and even seek the prospect of a Fatimid takeover of the country. During the Fatimid conquest of Egypt in June 969, Ibn al-Furat offered no resistance and merely supervised negotiations with the Fatimid general Jawhar.

Jawhar kept Ibn al-Furat in office as head of the administration, but he was dismissed after Caliph al-Mu'izz li-Din Allah arrived in Egypt in 973.

== Family and character ==
Abu'l-Fadl Ja'far ibn al-Furat was born in 921, the scion of a bureaucratic dynasty, the Banu'l-Furat, that had occupied senior posts in the fiscal bureaucracy of the Abbasid Caliphate at Baghdad since the reign of Caliph al-Mu'tadid (r. 892–902) and had gone on to become one of the two major factions within the Abbasid administrative elite in the first decades of the 10th century. Ibn al-Furat's father was al-Fadl ibn al-Furat (died 938), who had held several posts in the fiscal ministries of the Abbasid Caliphate, and had served as vizier for a few months in 932 and in 937, before retiring to Egypt, ruled since 935 by Muhammad ibn Tughj al-Ikhshid.

Ibn al-Furat himself became tied to the Ikhshidid dynasty by his marriage to an Ikhshidid princess, while his sister had married the one-time Abbasid generalissimo (amir al-umara) Muhammad ibn Ra'iq, and their son Muzahim, originally held as a hostage in the Ikhshidid court, had become a senior commander in the Ikhshidid army and also married an Ikhshidid princess.

Ibn al-Furat was known for his piety and strict moral principles, which he imposed on his relatives, and which earned him the support of the religious circles. His piety was also expressed through his cultivation of the ashraf: every year he sent gifts of money to the Alid families of Mecca and Medina, and purchased a plot of land in the latter city where he intended to be buried. This in turn gave him the backing of the ashraf in Egypt, and especially of their leader, Abu Ja'far Muslim, a close personal friend. He was also esteemed for his deep knowledge about traditions concerning the Prophet Muhammad, so that the leading hadith scholar of the time, the Iraqi al-Daraqutni, came from Baghdad to consult with him. As the historian of the vizierate, Dominique Sourdel, writes, Ibn al-Furat "left behind him the reputation of a generous patron of poets and scholars [...] but also that of an eccentric who had acquired a collection of snakes and scorpions which terrified his neighbours".

== Career ==
Ibn al-Furat became vizier in 946, succeeding his father's old political rival, Abu Bakr Muhammad ibn Ali al-Madhara'i. Ibn al-Furat held the post continuously under the Ikhshidid emirs Unujur (r. 946–961) and Ali (r. 961–966), as well as under Abu al-Misk Kafur, the strongman who, after having long served as the power being the throne, became emir in his own right from 966 to 968.

=== Crisis of the Ikhshidid regime, 968–969 ===
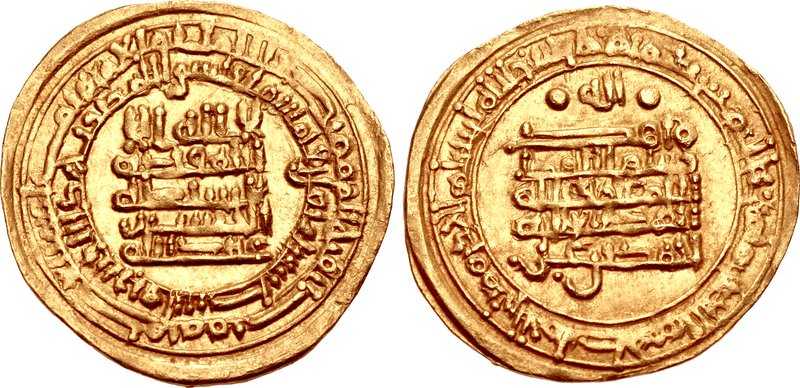
Gold dinar in the name of the last Ikhshidid ruler, Abu'l-Fawaris Ahmad, minted in 968/9 in Ramla, Palestine

After Kafur's death in April 968, the various factions initially agreed on a pact to share power under the nominal rule of al-Ikhshid's eleven-year-old grandson, Abu'l-Fawaris Ahmad ibn Ali, as emir. Ibn al-Furat, by virtue of his office, was the leader of the civilian bureaucratic faction. In alliance with the commander-in-chief Shamul, Ibn al-Furat seemed set to secure the role of regent over the under-age ruler, while as the husband of an Ikhshidid princess, he could hope to possibly place his own son, Ahmad, on the throne. Nevertheless, the new regime was unstable: Ibn al-Furat lacked a power-base outside the bureaucracy, Fatimid agents stirred up trouble among the Bedouin in Syria, the army was divided into mutually antagonistic factions (chiefly the Ikhshidiyya, recruited by al-Ikhshid, and the Kafuriyya, recruited by Kafur), and the treasury was empty due to a series of low Nile floods that had caused an unprecedented famine.

Ibn al-Furat was quickly confronted with his inability to impose his authority: the military chiefs withheld the revenue due to the central treasury from their fiefs (iqta), and were soon emulated by the regional fiscal officials. To find money, the vizier was thus forced to impose fines on other high officials, 4,500 gold dinars on Ya'qub ibn Killis, and 10,000 dinars on the Christian Ibrahim ibn Marwan, secretary of al-Ikhshid's sons. Left unpaid, the Turkish ghilman rioted, and on 29 August 968, the mutinous troops sacked his own palace, forcing Ibn al-Furat to go into hiding. A few days later, the sharif Abu Ja'far Muslim gathered the highest officials and military commanders in his home, and effected a reconciliation with Ibn al-Furat, by having him appear before them dressed in the formal costume of Kafur; moved by the sight, Ibn al-Furat's rivals agreed to support him. Ibn al-Furat then led the Friday prayer, before going to pay his respects to the widow of Ali ibn al-Ikhshid, the grandmother of the young emir, thus implicitly disavowing any designs of placing his own son on the throne.

Nevertheless, the situation remained difficult: financial problems persisted, and Ibn al-Furat remained unable to restore the overland Hajj pilgrimage to Mecca, a key demand of the religious class. This impasse led to a growing willingness to accept any solution, even a foreign intervention. The Fatimid agents in Fustat, led by the merchant Abu Ja'far Ahmad ibn Nasr, worked to exploit the situation, win the support, or at least passive acceptance, of the elites and the common people alike. Dissension was sown among the elites in order to prevent any rapprochement between the Ikhshidiyya and the Kafuriyya, while some of Ibn al-Furat's rivals were encouraged to defect to the Fatimids; most prominent among them being Ibn Killis, who provided the Fatimids with valuable information on the situation in Egypt.

Amidst this chaos, some in the ruling circles turned to al-Hasan ibn Ubayd Allah, an older cousin of the emir and governor of Palestine, for help. Al-Hasan was facing problems of his own: a Qarmatian army had invaded the Ikhshidid territories, defeated al-Hasan, and forced him to agree to the payment of a heavy tribute of 300,000 gold dinars. With his position in Palestine endangered, in need of money, and encouraged by the continued instability in Fustat, al-Hasan resolved to return to Egypt. Without facing any opposition, al-Hasan made a triumphal entrance into Fustat on 28 November, accompanied by Ibn al-Furat. He was immediately recognized as the regent and co-ruler of the young emir, and took up residence in the palace. Three days later he imprisoned Ibn al-Furat and a number of his associates, and imposed fines so heavy on them that Ibn al-Furat was forced to sell some of his properties to pay them.

Al-Hasan moved one step further to the throne when he married his cousin Fatima, a daughter of al-Ikhshid, on 1 January 969. In almost complete control of the regime, al-Hasan nevertheless despaired of his ability to restore order to Egypt. Instead, he chose to leave the country to its fate and focus his energy and resources on trying to hold the Ikhshidid domains in Palestine and Syria. On 24 February 969 he abandoned Fustat, taking with him many provincial governors and administrative officials, as well as some of the best Ikhshidid troops under Shamul. Fustat was left in a complete power vacuum: Ibn al-Furat, who had been set free before al-Hasan's departure, formally resumed his duties, but lacked any support among the remaining notables, who, on the other hand, were unable to put forward any candidate to replace him.

Faced with this impasse, the Egyptian elites were left only "with the choice of seeking outside intervention", in the words of historian Yaacov Lev. Given the international situation at the time, this could only mean the Fatimids. Fatimid agents had for years operated more or less openly in Fustat, and had created an extensive network of contacts among the common people and the elites alike. This "intensive period of psychological and political preparation" (Thierry Bianquis) was decisive in undermining the will to resist and preparing the way for military conquest. During the crisis of 968–969, letters from civilian as well as military leaders in Fustat were sent to the Fatimid caliph al-Mu'izz li-Din Allah (r. 953–975) in Ifriqiya, where preparations for a new invasion of Egypt were already in full swing.

When the Fatimid army under Jawhar arrived in Egypt in June 969, all Ibn al-Furat could do was to supervise the negotiations for surrender with Jawhar.

=== Under the Fatimids ===
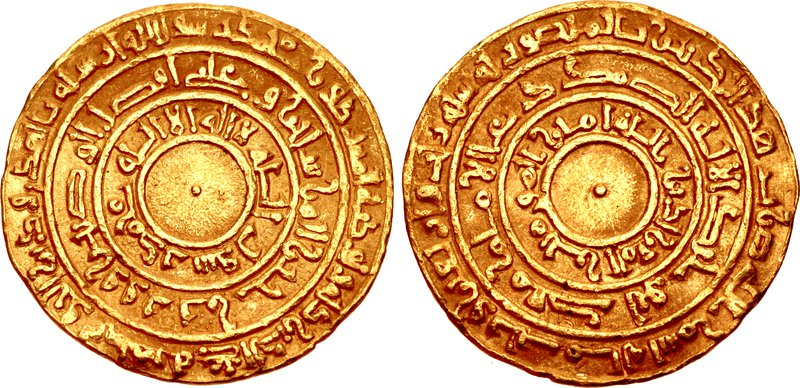
Gold dinar of al-Mu'izz, minted in al-Mansuriya in 954/5

Jawhar was anxious to ensure an orderly transition of power, keep the administration running, and avoid the impression of a foreign, forcible take-over of Egypt. As a result, he kept the Ikhshidid officials in place. Among others, Ibn al-Furat was kept in his post. He was not entirely trusted, however: when the Qarmatians invaded Egypt in September 971, Jawhar had him placed under constant surveillance, and to avoid a defection, gave him a residence in the new capital of Cairo, then under construction.

Ja'far continued in office for under Jawhar, but was dismissed by the Fatimid caliph al-Mu'izz (r. 953–975) in favour of his rival Ibn Killis. Following the death of Ibn Killis in 991, he was again offered the post of vizier, but resigned after a few months. He died in 1001.

His son Abu'l-Abbas was appointed vizier by the Fatimid caliph al-Hakim (r. 996–1021) in 1014/5, but executed after a few days.

== Sources ==
- Bianquis, Thierry (1972). "La prise de pouvoir par les Fatimides en Égypte (357‑363/968‑974)" [The Seizure of Power by the Fatimids in Egypt (357–363/968–974)]. Annales islamologiques (in French). XI: 49–108. ISSN 0570-1716.
- Bianquis, Thierry (1998). "Autonomous Egypt from Ibn Ṭūlūn to Kāfūr, 868–969". In Petry, Carl F. (ed.). The Cambridge History of Egypt, Volume 1: Islamic Egypt, 640–1517. Vol. 1. Cambridge: Cambridge University Press. pp. 86–119. ISBN 0-521-47137-0.
- Brett, Michael (2001). The Rise of the Fatimids: The World of the Mediterranean and the Middle East in the Fourth Century of the Hijra, Tenth Century CE. The Medieval Mediterranean. Vol. 30. Leiden: BRILL. ISBN 9004117415.
- Kennedy, Hugh (2004). The Prophet and the Age of the Caliphates: The Islamic Near East from the 6th to the 11th Century (Second ed.). Harlow: Longman. ISBN 978-0-582-40525-7.
- Lev, Yaacov (1991). State and Society in Fatimid Egypt. Leiden: Brill. ISBN 90-04-09344-3.
- Sourdel, D. (1971). "Ibn al-Furāt". In Lewis, B.; Ménage, V. L.; Pellat, Ch. & Schacht, J. (eds.). The Encyclopaedia of Islam, Second Edition. Volume III: H–Iram. Leiden: E. J. Brill. pp. 767–768. doi:10.1163/1573-3912_islam_COM_0322. OCLC 495469525.
