= Abu Bakr Muhammad ibn Ali al-Madhara'i =

Abbasid director of finance for Egypt and Syria (871–957)

Abu Bakr Muhammad ibn Ali al-Madhara'i (871–957) was the last important representative of the bureaucratic al-Madhara'i dynasty of fiscal officials. He served as director of finances of Egypt and Syria under the Tulunid dynasty and the Abbasid Caliphate, as well as becoming vizier for the Tulunid ruler Harun ibn Khumarawayh, and later occupying high office under the Ikhshidids.

== Life ==
Born in 871, Muhammad was the son of Ali ibn Ahmad al-Madhara'i and grandson of the family's founder, Abu Bakr Ahmad. Ahmad had been appointed head of finances of Tulunid Egypt in 879, and his family were likewise appointed to senior positions in the fiscal bureaucracy. As its nisba shows, the family hailed from the village of Madharaya near Wasit in lower Iraq. Muhammad came to Egypt in 885, where his father had become vizier to the Tulunid ruler, Khumarawayh (reigned 884–896). Ali appointed him deputy director of finances. His father was murdered along with Khumarawayh's short-lived successor, Jaysh, in 896, and Muhammad became vizier of the new Tulunid ruler, Harun (r. 896–904).

Following the overthrow of the Tulunids and the re-establishment of direct control over Egypt and Syria by the Abbasid Caliphate in 904–5, Muhammad and many of his followers were deported to the Abbasid capital, Baghdad, while his uncle, Abu Ali al-Husayn, thanks to his contacts in the Abbasid court, managed to survive the regime change and become financial director of Egypt. The family now became involved in factional struggles between the leading bureaucratic factions in Baghdad, siding with the opposition to the Banu'l-Furat clan. Its fortunes fluctuated as a result: in 913, al-Husayn was moved once more to Syria, while Muhammad departed Baghdad to take over the finances in Egypt, but both were dismissed in 917, when the Banu'l-Furat regained the vizierate in Baghdad.

Muhammad then retired to private life in the Egyptian capital, Fustat. The family had already amassed an enormous fortune through its control of the province's finances, but Muhammad went on to increase it further. At the same time, he publicly expressed his religious piety, by going to the Hajj pilgrimage to Mecca every year between 913 and 934, and distributing lavish presents to the holy cities of Mecca and Medina and their inhabitants. During the second Fatimid invasion of Egypt, al-Madhara'i corresponded with the Fatimid commander, the heir-apparent al-Qa'im, and kept him informed about the state of the Fustat garrison. As al-Qa'im did not launch an attack on the city, despite the garrison's weakness, it may be that al-Madhara'i played a double game, trying to delay an attack until fresh Abbasid troops arrived from Iraq.

Al-Madhara'i was re-appointed as the director of Egyptian finances in 930, under the governorship of his friend Takin al-Khazari, but lost it again after Takin's death in 933. In the factional strife that engulfed Egypt after Takin's death, Muhammad played a major role, and was an opponent to Takin's son Muhammad. In 935, Muhammad ibn Tughj was appointed governor of Egypt by the Abbasid vizier Abu'l-Fath al-Fadl (another member of the Banu'l-Furat). Although Ibn Tughj reached out to him and sought an amicable agreement, Muhammad refused to recognize his appointment and tried to resist his takeover of Egypt, but his troops defected to Ibn Tughj without a fight.

Following Ibn Tughj's entry into Fustat in August 935, Muhammad went into hiding, but when Abu'l-Fath al-Fadl himself abandoned Baghdad and came to Egypt in 937, the al-Madhara'i were arrested, and Muhammad had to surrender much of his fortune to the treasury. After the death of Abu'l-Fath al-Fadl in 939, he was released from prison and soon regained his rank and power in the Ikhshidid court. By the time of Ibn Tughj's death in 946, he was strong enough to become the de facto regent for Ibn Tughj's under-age son Unujur, but he was soon overthrown and imprisoned in a coup orchestrated by Abu'l-Fath al-Fadl's son Ja'far. He was released in 947 by the new strongman, Kafur, and retired once more into private life. His death at Fustat on 16 January 957 ended the al-Madhara'i line.

== Sources ==
- Bianquis, Thierry (1998). "Autonomous Egypt from Ibn Ṭūlūn to Kāfūr, 868–969". In Petry, Carl F. (ed.). The Cambridge History of Egypt: Islamic Egypt, 640–1517. Vol. 1. Cambridge: Cambridge University Press. pp. 86–119. ISBN 0-521-47137-0.
- Gottschalk, H. L. (1986). "al-Mād̲h̲arāʾī". In Bosworth, C. E.; van Donzel, E.; Lewis, B. & Pellat, Ch. (eds.). The Encyclopaedia of Islam, Second Edition. Volume V: Khe–Mahi. Leiden: E. J. Brill. p. 953. ISBN 978-90-04-07819-2.
- Halm, Heinz (1991). Das Reich des Mahdi: Der Aufstieg der Fatimiden [The Empire of the Mahdi: The Rise of the Fatimids] (in German). Munich: C. H. Beck. ISBN 978-3-406-35497-7.
- Lev, Yaacov (1988). "The Fāṭimids and Egypt 301–358/914–969". Arabica. 35 (2): 186–196. doi:10.1163/157005888X00332.
