= Abu'l-Tayyib Ahmad ibn Ali al-Madhara'i =

Director of finance in Tulunid Egypt (died 915)

Abu'l-Tayyib Ahmad ibn Ali al-Madhara'i (died 915) was a member of the bureaucratic al-Madhara'i dynasty of fiscal officials, and served as director of finances of Egypt for the Tulunid dynasty during its last decades.

== Life ==
Ahmad was a son of Ali ibn Ahmad al-Madhara'i and grandson of the family's founder, Abu Bakr Ahmad. Abu Bakr had been named controller of finances by the autonomous ruler of Egypt and Syria, Ahmad ibn Tulun, and had in turn named Ali as his representative in Egypt and another son, al-Husayn, as his representative in Syria. After Abu Bakr died in 884, Ali became vizier of the Tulunid domains until his murder in 896. Ahmad succeeded his father as fiscal director of Egypt, while his uncle al-Husayn held the analogous post in Syria, until the end of the Tulunid dynasty in 904–5. Ahmad's brother Muhammad became vizier in their father's place in 896–904. After the Abbasids re-established direct control over the former Tulunid domains in 904–5, Ahmad was replaced in Egypt by his uncle al-Husayn. He died in 915.

== Sources ==
- Gottschalk, H. L. (1986). "al-Mād̲h̲arāʾī". In Bosworth, C. E.; van Donzel, E.; Lewis, B. & Pellat, Ch. (eds.). The Encyclopaedia of Islam, Second Edition. Volume V: Khe–Mahi. Leiden: E. J. Brill. p. 953. doi:10.1163/1573-3912_islam_SIM_4729. ISBN 978-90-04-07819-2.
