= Abu'l-Faraj al-Tarsusi =

Abu'l-Faraj al-Tarsusi was a commander from Tarsus who served the Ikhshidids of Egypt.

As his nisba indicates, Abu'l-Faraj was originally from Tarsus, a city on the frontier of the Muslim lands with the Byzantine Empire. According to Maqrizi, he came from a family with distinguished military background, and was instructed in the art of war and chivalry (furusiyya) by his father. He was involved in the border warfare with the Byzantines, and even spent a time as a prisoner of war of the latter. In 960/1 he left Tarsus and went to Egypt, where the local Ikhshidid ruler, Kafur al-Ikhshidi, appointed him as commander of the navy. In this capacity Abu'l-Faraj led a raid against the Byzantine Empire, comprising eleven large and five small warships. The raid achieved little except returning safely to its base. Abu'l-Faraj died soon after, and was succeeded by his lieutenant, Abdallah al-Khazin.

== Sources ==
- Lev, Yaacov (1999–2000). "The Fatimids and Byzantium, 10th–12th Centuries". Graeco-Arabica. 7–8: 273–281. OCLC 183390203.
