= Ali ibn Ahmad al-Madhara'i =

9th-century director of finance of Tulunid Egypt

Ali ibn Ahmad al-Madhara'i (died 897) was a member of the al-Madhara'i family of fiscal bureaucrats, serving as director of finances and vizier under the Tulunids of Egypt.

As its nisba shows, the family hailed from the village of Madharaya near Wasit in lower Iraq. Ali was a son of the founder of the family's fortunes, Abu Bakr Ahmad ibn Ibrahim al-Madhara'i. Educated in the traditions of the Abbasid bureaucracy at Samarra, Ali and his sons moved to Egypt, where in 879 Ahmad was appointed director of finances (‘āmil) by Ahmad ibn Tulun, the autonomous ruler of Egypt and later Syria. Ahmad held his post until his death in 884, and appointed Ali and his brother al-Husayn as his representatives in Egypt and Syria respectively. Ali succeeded his father in 884, serving as vizier to the new Tulunid ruler, Khumarawayh ibn Ahmad ibn Tulun, throughout the latter's reign (884–896). He continued in the post under Khumarawayh's underage successor, Jaysh ibn Khumarawayh, and was murdered on the same day as he in 897.

Ali's sons, Abu'l-Tayyib Ahmad (died 915), and Abu Bakr Muhammad, continued to occupy high office, Ahmad as fiscal director and Muhammad as vizier to the new Tulunid ruler, Harun ibn Khumarawayh. Muhammad was the longest-serving and last important representative of the family, surviving the Abbasid recovery of the Tulunid domains and going on to serve the Ikhshidid dynasty after 939.

== Sources ==
- Bianquis, Thierry (1998). "Autonomous Egypt from Ibn Ṭūlūn to Kāfūr, 868–969". In Petry, Carl F. (ed.). Cambridge History of Egypt, Volume One: Islamic Egypt, 640–1517. Cambridge: Cambridge University Press. pp. 86–119. ISBN 978-0-521-47137-4.
- Gottschalk, H. L. (1986). "al-Mād̲h̲arāʾī". In Bosworth, C. E.; van Donzel, E.; Lewis, B. & Pellat, Ch. (eds.). The Encyclopaedia of Islam, Second Edition. Volume V: Khe–Mahi. Leiden: E. J. Brill. p. 953. doi:10.1163/1573-3912_islam_SIM_4729. ISBN 978-90-04-07819-2.
