= Al-Madhara'i =

The al-Madhara'i (Arabic: الماذرائيون) were a family of officials from Iraq who served as and virtually monopolized the posts of director of finances (‘āmil) of Egypt and Syria for the Tulunid dynasty, the Abbasid Caliphate, and the Ikhshidid dynasty, between 879 and 946. In this role, they amassed "one of the largest personal fortunes in the medieval Arab east" (Thierry Bianquis).

As its nisba shows, the family hailed from the village of Madharaya near Wasit in lower Iraq. The first member to rise to prominence was Abu Bakr Ahmad ibn Ibrahim al-Madhara'i, who in 879 was named controller of finances by the autonomous ruler of Egypt and Syria, Ahmad ibn Tulun (reigned 868–884), a post he kept until his death in 884. He named his sons Ali and Abu Ali al-Husayn as his representatives in Egypt and Syria respectively. Ali succeeded his father and became vizier under Khumarawayh ibn Ahmad ibn Tulun (r. 884–896) and during the brief reign of Jaysh ibn Khumarawayh, along with whom he was murdered in 896. He was in turn succeeded as fiscal director by his son Abu'l-Tayyib Ahmad (died 915), while another son, Abu Bakr Muhammad served as vizier to the penultimate Tulunid ruler, Harun ibn Khumarawayh (r. 896–904).

Following the end of the Tulunid dynasty and the re-imposition of direct Abbasid control over their domains in 904–5, many of the family and its followers were deported to Baghdad, but al-Husayn, who had maintained contacts with the Abbasid court, was appointed in charge of the Egyptian finances. The family now became involved in factional struggles between the leading bureaucratic factions in Baghdad, siding with the opposition to the Banu'l-Furat clan. Its fortunes fluctuated as a result. In 913, al-Husayn was moved once more to Syria, while his nephew Abu Bakr Muhammad took over in Egypt, but both were dismissed in 917. Al-Husayn again served as financial director of Egypt in 919–922, and for a third and final time (along with Syria) from 926 until his death in 929. The last important representative of the family, al-Husayn's nephew Abu Bakr Muhammad, took over the direction of Egyptian finances in 930–933, under the governorship of his friend Takin al-Khazari. In 936 he tried without success to oppose the takeover of Egypt by Muhammad ibn Tughj, and was imprisoned. Released in 939, he played a leading role in the governance of the new Ikhshidid state until his dismissal in 946, after Ibn Tughj's death. He retired into private life, and died in 957.

== Sources ==
- Bianquis, Thierry (1998). "Autonomous Egypt from Ibn Ṭūlūn to Kāfūr, 868–969". In Petry, Carl F. (ed.). The Cambridge History of Egypt: Islamic Egypt, 640–1517. Vol. 1. Cambridge: Cambridge University Press. pp. 86–119. ISBN 0-521-47137-0.
- Gottschalk, H. L. (1986). "al-Mād̲h̲arāʾī". In Bosworth, C. E.; van Donzel, E.; Lewis, B. & Pellat, Ch. (eds.). The Encyclopaedia of Islam, Second Edition. Volume V: Khe–Mahi. Leiden: E. J. Brill. p. 953. doi:10.1163/1573-3912_islam_SIM_4729. ISBN 978-90-04-07819-2.
