= Abu'l-Fawaris Ahmad ibn Ali =

Autonomous ruler of Egypt, Syria and Hejaz (968–969)

- Autonomous ruler of Egypt, Syria and the Hejaz
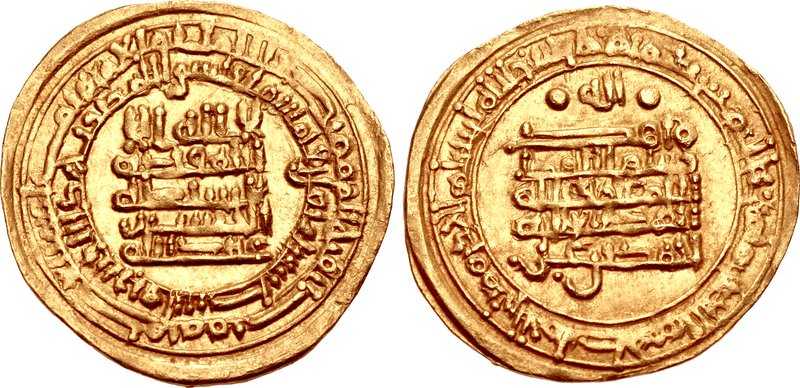
- Gold dinar minted in the name of Abu'l-Fawaris Ahmad and Abbasid caliph, mint in Palestine, 968/9
- Rule: 23 April 968 – 5 August 969
- Predecessor: Abu al-Misk Kafur
- Successor: None (Fatimid conquest of Egypt)
- Regent: Ja'far ibn al-Furat; Al-Hasan ibn Ubayd Allah ibn Tughj
- Died: 13 July 987
- House: Ikhshidids
- Father: Abu'l-Hasan Ali ibn al-Ikhshid
- Religion: Sunni Islam

Abu'l-Fawaris Ahmad ibn Ali ibn al-Ikhshid (Arabic: أبو الفوارس أحمد بن علي بن الإخشيد) was the last ruler of the autonomous ruler of Ikhshidid dynasty, which ruled Egypt, Syria and the Hejaz, from 968 to 969. However, he was a child and did not exercise actual rule, being instead under the tutelage first of the vizier Ja'far ibn al-Furat and then of his uncle al-Hasan ibn Ubayd Allah ibn Tughj. His reign ended with the conquest of Egypt by the Fatimids in the summer of 969.

== Life ==
Ahmad was the son of the third Ikhshidid ruler, Abu'l-Hasan Ali ibn al-Ikhshid, and grandson of the dynasty's founder, Muhammad ibn Tughj al-Ikhshid. When his father Ali died in January 966, he was only ten; consequently, the powerful man Abu'l-Misk Kafur, who had long been the virtual ruler of the state, assumed the reins of power himself.

Ahmad succeeded to the throne after Kafur's death in April 968, but the situation in Egypt was critical: the vizier Ja'far ibn al-Furat tried to control the government, but lacked a power-base outside the bureaucracy; Fatimid agents stirred up trouble among the Bedouin; the army was divided into mutually antagonistic factions (the Ikhshidiyya, recruited by Muhammad al-Ikhshid, the Kafuriyya, recruited by Kafur, and the Saqaliba or Rum, European/Byzantine slave-soldiers); and the treasury was empty due to a series of low Nile floods that had caused famine. In the end, Ibn al-Furat was overthrown by Ahmad's uncle, al-Hasan ibn Ubayd Allah ibn Tughj, governor of Palestine. Hasan seized control of Fustat in autumn 968, and installed himself as regent. On the coinage minted during this period, Hasan's name even preceded that of Ahmad, the nominal ruler. However, after only three months, Al-Hasan replaced Ibn al-Furat with his private secretary, al-Hasan ibn Jabir al-Rayahi, entrusted him with the governance of Egypt, and returned to Palestine.

=== Fatimid invasion and Deposed ===
Soon after, the Fatimids, taking advantage of the turmoil in the Ikhshidid regime, launched an invasion under Jawhar al-Siqilli. By June 969, the Fatimid army stood before Fustat. After the Ikhshidid troops failed in a last-ditch effort to stop the Fatimids, the city, and Egypt with it, surrendered. Ahmad was taken prisoner, thus ending the Ikhshidid dynasty, although the last Ikhshidid loyalists under his uncle remained in control of the southern part of Syria until in turn defeated by the Fatimids in spring 970. According to the historian al-Farghani, relayed by Ibn Khallikan, Ahmad died on 13 July 987.

== Sources ==
- Bacharach, Jere L. (2006). Islamic History Through Coins: An Analysis and Catalogue of Tenth-century Ikhshidid Coinage. Cairo: American University in Cairo. ISBN 9774249305.
- Bianquis, Thierry (1998). "Autonomous Egypt from Ibn Ṭūlūn to Kāfūr, 868–969". In Petry, Carl F. (ed.). The Cambridge History of Egypt: Islamic Egypt, 640–1517. Vol. 1. Cambridge: Cambridge University Press. pp. 86–119. ISBN 0-521-47137-0.
- Brett, Michael (2001). The Rise of the Fatimids: The World of the Mediterranean and the Middle East in the Fourth Century of the Hijra, Tenth Century CE. The Medieval Mediterranean. Vol. 30. Leiden: BRILL. ISBN 9004117415.
- Kennedy, Hugh (2004) [1986]. The Prophet and the Age of the Caliphates: The Islamic Near East from the 6th to the 11th Century (Second ed.). Harlow: Longman. ISBN 978-0-582-40525-7.
- McGuckin de Slane, William, ed. (1868). Ibn Khallikan's Biographical Dictionary, translated from the Arabic by Bn. William McGuckin de Slane, Vol. III. Paris: Oriental translation fund of Great Britain and Ireland.

Preceded by Abu'l-Misk Kafur	Ikhshidid governor of Egypt, southern Syria and the Hejaz (de jure for the Abbasid Caliphate); April 968 – June 969	Fatimid conquest of Egypt
