= Al-Hasan ibn Ubayd Allah ibn Tughj =

Ikhshidid prince and governor of Palestine (924/5-982)

Governor of Palestine
- In office April 968 – March 970
- Preceded by: Akhu Muslim

Abu Muhammad al-Hasan ibn Ubayd Allah ibn Tughj (924/5 – 19 January 982) was an Ikhshidid prince and briefly governor of Palestine and regent for his underage nephew Abu'l-Fawaris Ahmad in 968–969. After his departure from Egypt, he assumed control of the remaining Ikhshidid domains in southern Syria and Palestine until defeated and captured by the Fatimids in March 970. He died in Cairo in 982.

== Life ==
Hasan was a son of Ubayd Allah ibn Tughj, and hence member of a cadet branch of the main Ikhshidid dynasty, founded by Ubayd Allah's brother Muhammad ibn Tughj al-Ikhshid. According to the historian al-Farghani, relayed by Ibn Khallikan, he was born in 924/5. The famed poet al-Mutanabbi, during his sojourn in Egypt, dedicated a long qasida poem to Hasan.

=== Governor of Palestine ===
Following the death in April 968 of Abu al-Misk Kafur—who had formally ruled the Ikhshidid state since 966, but had been the real power behind the throne since al-Ikhshid's death in 946—Hasan was appointed to the governorship of Palestine, where he confronted and ousted the previous governor, Akhu Muslim. During this contest, he is reported to have written to the Fatimid caliph, al-Mu'izz li-Din Allah, urging him to invade Egypt and restore order in the country, which since the death of Kafur was plagued by factional rivalries that had paralyzed its administration.

This very chaos in Egypt led to the arrival in September of a delegation of Ikhshidid officials, led by the black eunuch Fanak, who requested that he return to Egypt and take over the government from the vizier Ja'far ibn al-Furat. For the moment, Hasan deferred, wishing to first strengthen his own hold over Syria and Palestine. For the same reason, he appointed Fanak as governor of Damascus. Indeed, his control of Syria would be challenged shortly after by a Qarmatian invasion. The Qarmatians, under the command of al-Hasan al-A'sam, captured Damascus and on 28 October defeated Hasan in battle before his capital, Ramla. The town was plundered for two days, but the locals managed to buy off the Qarmatians with 125,000 gold dinars. Hasan was obliged to agree to an annual tribute of 300,000 dinars to maintain control of Syria.

=== Regent of Egypt ===
Now in desperate need of money, and possibly encouraged by Ibn al-Furat's continuing troubles, Hasan returned to Egypt. From Farama he followed the Nile down to Rawda Island, and made his ceremonial entry into the capital, Fustat, on Friday, 28 November 968, accompanied by the vizier Ibn al-Furat. In the ensuing Friday prayer, his name was mentioned immediately after that of the underage emir, Abu'l-Fawaris Ahmad, in the khuṭba, thus effectively marking Hasan as regent or even co-ruler. As such, his name was added on the coinage, which were the last coins minted by the Ikhshidid dynasty. Tellingly Hasan's name is found in the second position, after that of the Abbasid caliph al-Muti, and is followed by that of his nephew and nominal ruler, Ahmad. Taking up residence in the palace, Hasan moved to consolidate his authority: three days later he imprisoned Ibn al-Furat and a number of the latter's associates, forcing them to pay exorbitant fines. Al-Hasan replaced Ibn al-Furat with his private secretary, al-Hasan ibn Jabir al-Rayahi.

To further enhance his legitimacy, on 1 January 969, he married his first cousin Fatima, daughter of al-Ikhshid, to whom he had been betrothed already during his governorship of Palestine. Despite now being in almost complete control of the regime, al-Hasan despaired of his ability to restore order to Egypt. Instead, he chose to leave the country to its fate and focus his energy and resources on trying to hold the Ikhshidid domains in Palestine and Syria. On 22 or 24 February 969 he abandoned Fustat, taking with him many provincial governors and administrative officials, as well as some of the best Ikhshidid troops under Shamul. Fustat was left in a complete power vacuum: Ibn al-Furat, who had been set free before al-Hasan's departure, formally resumed his duties, but lacked any support among the remaining notables, who, on the other hand, were unable to put forward any candidate to replace him.

=== Return to Palestine ===
The situation in Palestine had deteriorated in his absence, as the Qarmatians once more threatened Ikhshidid rule, while further north, the collapse of Hamdanid power in northern Syria exposed the entire region to the Byzantines, who laid siege to Antioch, capturing the city in October 969.

Following his departure from Egypt, the province was invaded and swiftly taken over by the Fatimids under Jawhar al-Siqilli. Following the demise of Ikhshidid rule in Egypt, Hasan remained the last Ikhshidid ruler, controlling the dynasty's possessions in Palestine and Syria. Hasan initially moved his residence north to Damascus, but after learning of the Fatimids' conquest of Egypt he returned to Ramla to supervise the defence of Palestine, leaving Damascus and its province in the hands of the commander Shamul, and the province of Jordan under the ghulam Fatik. There in October/November 969 he confronted another Qarmatian invasion. Defeated once again, he nevertheless managed to conclude peace with them in exchange of an annual tribute of 300,000 dinars, sealed by unspecified "marriage relations". The Qarmatians left after 30 days, but a detachment was apparently left behind and joined Hasan's army.

Although his army was augmented by the remnants of the Ikhshidid regiments from Egypt, as well as Qarmatians, in March 970 the Ikhshidids were defeated in battle by Ja'far ibn Fallah, and Hasan was taken prisoner and sent to the Fatimid caliph, al-Mu'izz. Eventually, he was brought back to Fustat (March/April 970). His fate after that is unknown, but al-Farghani reports that he died on 19 January 982.

== Sources ==
- Bacharach, Jere L. (2006). Islamic History Through Coins: An Analysis and Catalogue of Tenth-century Ikhshidid Coinage. Cairo: American University in Cairo. ISBN 9774249305.
- Bianquis, Thierry (1972). "La prise de pouvoir par les Fatimides en Égypte (357‑363/968‑974)" [The Seizure of Power by the Fatimids in Egypt (357–363/968–974)]. Annales Islamologiques (in French). XI: 49–108.
- Bianquis, Thierry (1998). "Autonomous Egypt from Ibn Ṭūlūn to Kāfūr, 868–969". In Petry, Carl F. (ed.). The Cambridge History of Egypt, Volume 1: Islamic Egypt, 640–1517. Vol. 1. Cambridge: Cambridge University Press. pp. 86–119. ISBN 0-521-47137-0.
- Brett, Michael (2001). The Rise of the Fatimids: The World of the Mediterranean and the Middle East in the Fourth Century of the Hijra, Tenth Century CE. The Medieval Mediterranean. Vol. 30. Leiden: BRILL. ISBN 9004117415.
- Gil, Moshe (1997) [1983]. A History of Palestine, 634–1099. Translated by Ethel Broido. Cambridge: Cambridge University Press. ISBN 0-521-59984-9.
- Madelung, Wilferd (1996). "The Fatimids and the Qarmaṭīs of Baḥrayn". In Daftary, Farhad (ed.). Mediaeval Isma'ili History and Thought. Cambridge: Cambridge University Press. pp. 21–73. ISBN 0-521-45140-X.
- McGuckin de Slane, William, ed. (1868). Ibn Khallikan's Biographical Dictionary, translated from the Arabic by Bn. William McGuckin de Slane, Vol. III. Paris: Oriental translation fund of Great Britain and Ireland.
