= Abdallah al-Khazin =

- Occupation: military commander

Abdallah al-Khazin was a military commander who served the Ikhshidids of Egypt.

In 956/7, he conquered the town of Ibrim in Nubia, while in 956/7, 960/1, and 964/5 he led unsuccessful naval raids against the Byzantine Empire, the last one along with a fleet from Syria. Sometime between the last two raids he also participated, as second-in-command, in another raid led by Abu'l-Faraj al-Tarsusi.

== Sources ==
- Lev, Yaacov (1999–2000). "The Fatimids and Byzantium, 10th–12th Centuries". Graeco-Arabica. 7–8: 273–281. OCLC 183390203.
