= Abu Ali al-Husayn ibn Ahmad al-Madhara'i =

Director of finance in Abbasid Egypt and Syria (died 929)

Abu Ali al-Husayn ibn Ahmad al-Madhara'i, also known as Abu Zunbur ("the hornets' man"), was a member of the bureaucratic al-Madhara'i dynasty of fiscal officials, and served as director of finances of Egypt and Syria for the Abbasid Caliphate in the first decades of the 10th century.

== Life ==
Al-Husayn was a son of Abu Bakr Ahmad ibn Ibrahim al-Madhara'i, who in 879 founded the family's fortunes when he was named controller of finances by the autonomous ruler of Egypt and Syria, Ahmad ibn Tulun. Abu Bakr held the post until his death in 884, and eventually named al-Husayn as his representative in Syria, while another son, Ali, fulfilled the same role in Egypt. Ali succeeded his father until his own death in 897, and was in turn succeeded by his son Ahmad.

Al-Husayn remained in charge of the finances of Syria throughout the Tulunid regime, but as it began to weaken, he took up contacts with the Abbasid court in Baghdad. Consequently, when the Tulunid domains were brought once more under direct Abbasid control in 904–5, and many of the family were deported to Baghdad, he replaced his nephew Ahmad as director of finances of Egypt. From this post he became involved in the factional struggles between the leading bureaucratic factions in Baghdad, the Banu'l-Furat clan and their opponents, the al-Madhara'i steadfastly siding with the latter. During the second vizierate of Ali ibn Isa al-Jarrah (913–917), al-Husayn was once more appointed to Syria, while another nephew, Muhammad, took over in Egypt. When Ali ibn Isa fell and was replaced by his arch-rival Abu'l-Hasan Ali ibn al-Furat, the al-Madhara'i were dismissed and imprisoned.

Al-Husayn was recalled to Baghdad, where he remained until May 919, when he was once more assigned to the post of financial director of Egypt. He kept the post until 922, when he was dismissed by Ali ibn Isa. Recalled to Baghdad in 923, he was forced to pay a huge fine of five million dirhams. Nevertheless, in 926 he was again sent to Egypt with his remit extended to Syria as well. He died in office at Fustat in 929.

== Sources ==
- Bianquis, Thierry (1998). "Autonomous Egypt from Ibn Ṭūlūn to Kāfūr, 868–969". In Petry, Carl F. (ed.). The Cambridge History of Egypt: Islamic Egypt, 640–1517. Vol. 1. Cambridge: Cambridge University Press. pp. 86–119. ISBN 0-521-47137-0.
- Gottschalk, H. L. (1986). "al-Mād̲h̲arāʾī". In Bosworth, C. E.; van Donzel, E.; Lewis, B. & Pellat, Ch. (eds.). The Encyclopaedia of Islam, Second Edition. Volume V: Khe–Mahi. Leiden: E. J. Brill. p. 953. doi:10.1163/1573-3912_islam_SIM_4729. ISBN 978-90-04-07819-2.
