= Abu'l-Hasan Ali ibn al-Ikhshid =

Ikhshidid sultan of Egypt from 960 to 966

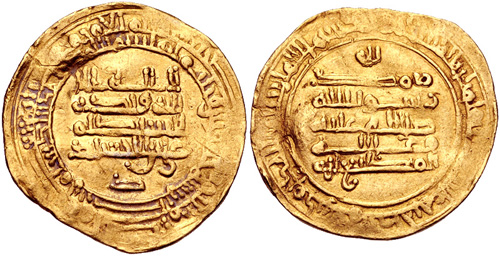
Gold dinar of Abu'l-Hasan Ali, minted at Fustat in 961/2

Abu'l-Hasan Ali ibn al-Ikhshid (Arabic: أبو الحسن علي بن الإخشيد) was the third ruler of the autonomous Ikhshidid dynasty, which ruled Egypt, Syria and the Hejaz for the Abbasid Caliphate. He reigned for six years, between 960 and 966 CE.

He was a younger son of the dynasty's founder, Muhammad ibn Tughj al-Ikhshid, and reigned from the death of his elder brother Unujur in 961. Actual power throughout his reign was held by the capable black eunuch Abu'l-Misk Kafur. The main events of his reign were a Nubian invasion in 963, as well as a resurgence of Bedouin unrest and raids both in the Western Desert and in the Syrian Desert, in the latter case accompanied by the reappearance of the Qarmatians. Anti-Christian riots were provoked by a defeat of the Ikhshidid fleet against the Byzantine navy in 960/963, as well as the Byzantine offensives under Nikephoros Phokas in Cilicia and northern Syria.

Ali died in January 966, and was buried in Jerusalem next to his father and brother, at a location close to the Gate of the Tribes on the Temple Mount. After Ali's death, Kafur sidelined Ali's underage son Ahmad and became ruler in his own right. Kafur ruled until his death in 968, when Ahmad succeeded him. The Ikhshidid state was weakened by internal turmoil and a succession of bad harvests, however, leading to its fall to the Fatimids in 969.

== Sources ==
- Bacharach, Jere L. (2006). Islamic History Through Coins: An Analysis and Catalogue of Tenth-century Ikhshidid Coinage. Cairo: American University in Cairo Press. ISBN 9774249305.
- Bianquis, Thierry (1998). "Autonomous Egypt from Ibn Ṭūlūn to Kāfūr, 868–969". In Petry, Carl F. (ed.). The Cambridge History of Egypt, Volume 1: Islamic Egypt, 640–1517. Vol. 1. Cambridge: Cambridge University Press. pp. 86–119. ISBN 0-521-47137-0.
- van Berchem, Max (1927). Matériaux pour un Corpus Inscriptionum Arabicarum, Deuxième partie: Syrie du Sud. Tome deuxième: Jérusalem «Haram» (in French). Cairo: Imprimerie de l'Institut français d'archéologie oriantele.

Preceded by Abu'l-Qasim Unujur ibn al-Ikhshid	Ikhshidid governor of Egypt, southern Syria and the Hejaz (de jure for the Abbasid Caliphate); 960–966	Succeeded by Abu'l-Misk Kafur
