= Al-Husayn ibn Sa'id =

- أبو عبدالله الحسين بن سعيد بن حمدان
- Known for: Member of the Hamdanid dynasty
- Spouse: Sarirah

Abu 'Abdallāh al-Husayn ibn Sa'id ibn Hamdan (Arabic: أبو عبدالله الحسين بن سعيد بن حمدان) was a member of the Hamdanid dynasty, grandson of its founder, Hamdan ibn Hamdun, and cousin of the emirs Nasir al-Dawla and Sayf al-Dawla.

In 944, he was sent by Nasir al-Dawla to seize Syria, allocated to the Hamdanids by the amir al-umara Tuzun, from the forces of Muhammad ibn Tughj al-Ikhshid. Husayn was initially successful in occupying the north of the country, but was soon driven out of Syria by Ikhshidid forces, led by al-Ikhshid himself. Husayn married Sarirah, a former slave of Ibn Ra'iq.

== Sources ==
- Bianquis, Thierry (1998). "Autonomous Egypt from Ibn Ṭūlūn to Kāfūr, 868–969". In Petry, Carl F. (ed.). Cambridge History of Egypt, Volume One: Islamic Egypt, 640–1517. Cambridge: Cambridge University Press. pp. 86–119. ISBN 0-521-47137-0.
