= Abu'l-Qasim Unujur ibn al-Ikhshid =

Emir of Egypt, Syria and Hejaz from 946 to 960

- Hereditary emir of Egypt, Syria and the Hejaz
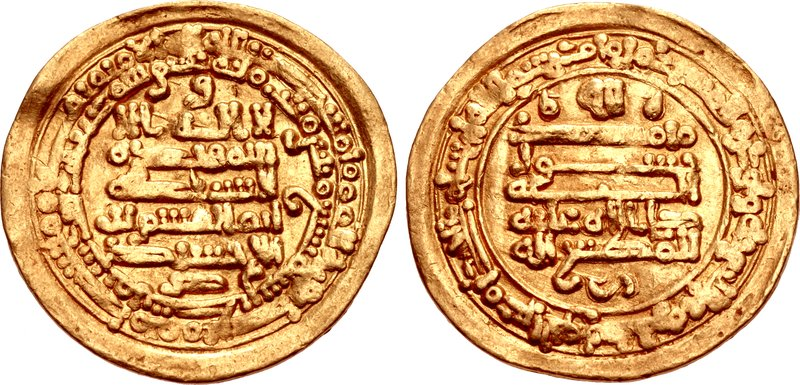
- Gold dinar of Abu'l-Qasim, minted 949/50, recognizing the suzerainty of Abbasid caliph.
- Rule: 946 – 960
- Predecessor: Muhammad ibn Tughj al-Ikhshid
- Successor: Abu'l-Hasan Ali ibn al-Ikhshid
- Died: 960; Jerusalem
- Burial: Jerusalem
- House: Ikhshidids
- Father: Muhammad ibn Tughj
- Religion: Islam (Sunni)

Abu'l-Qasim Unujur ibn al-Ikhshid (Arabic: أبو القاسم أنوجور بن الإخشيد), also written as Anujur, was the second ruler of the Ikhshidid dynasty, which ruled Egypt, Syria and the Hejaz under the suzerainty of the Abbasid Caliphate but de facto autonomous. Unujur ruled from 946 to 960, but much of the actual power was held by the black eunuch Abu'l-Misk Kafur.

Unujur died in 960 CE, and was buried in Jerusalem next to his father, at a location close to the Gate of the Tribes on the Temple Mount.

== Sources ==
- van Berchem, Max (1927). Matériaux pour un Corpus Inscriptionum Arabicarum, Deuxième partie: Syrie du Sud. Tome deuxième: Jérusalem "Haram" (in French). Cairo: Imprimerie de l'Institut français d'archéologie oriantele.

| Preceded by Muhammad ibn Tughj al-Ikhshid | Ikhshidid governor of Egypt, southern Syria and the Hejaz (de jure for the Abbasid Caliphate); 946–960 | Succeeded by Abu'l-Hasan Ali ibn al-Ikhshid |
