= Abu Bakr Ahmad ibn Ibrahim al-Madhara'i =

Founder al-Madhara'i family of Egyptian bureaucrats (died 884)

Abu Bakr Ahmad ibn Ibrahim al-Madhara'i (died 884), surnamed al-Atrash ("the Deaf"), was the founder of the al-Madhara'i family of fiscal bureaucrats.

As its nisba shows, the family hailed from the village of Madharaya near Wasit in lower Iraq. Educated in the traditions of the Abbasid bureaucracy at Samarra, Ahmad and his sons moved to Egypt, where in 879 he was appointed director of finances (‘āmil) by Ahmad ibn Tulun, the autonomous ruler of Egypt and later Syria as well. Ahmad held his post until his death in 884, and appointed his two sons, Ali and al-Husayn as his representatives in Egypt and Syria respectively. This laid the foundations for the virtual monopolization of the fiscal affairs of Egypt and Syria by his descendants under the Tulunids, the restored Abbasid government, and the subsequent autonomous Ikhshidid dynasty until 946.

== Sources ==
- Bianquis, Thierry (1998). "Autonomous Egypt from Ibn Ṭūlūn to Kāfūr, 868–969". In Petry, Carl F. (ed.). Cambridge History of Egypt, Volume One: Islamic Egypt, 640–1517. Cambridge: Cambridge University Press. pp. 86–119. ISBN 978-0-521-47137-4.
- Gottschalk, H. L. (1986). "al-Mād̲h̲arāʾī". In Bosworth, C. E.; van Donzel, E.; Lewis, B. & Pellat, Ch. (eds.). The Encyclopaedia of Islam, Second Edition. Volume V: Khe–Mahi. Leiden: E. J. Brill. p. 953. doi:10.1163/1573-3912_islam_SIM_4729. ISBN 978-90-04-07819-2.
