= Abu al-Misk Kafur =

Ruler of Ikhshidid Egypt and Syria (905–968)

Abū al-Misk Kāfūr al-Ikhshīdī
- al-Ustādh
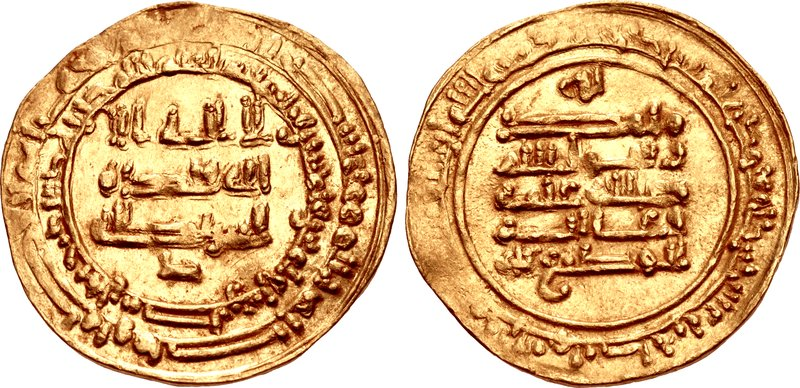
- Gold dinar of Abu al-Misk Kafur minted in 966 in Ramla, Palestine. The letter kaf on the obverse represents Kafur.

Governor of Autonomous Egypt
- Reign: 5 February 966 – 22 April 968
- Predecessor: Abu'l-Hasan Ali ibn al-Ikhshid
- Successor: Abu'l-Fawaris Ahmad ibn Ali

Regent of Egypt
- Regency: 24 July 946 – 7 January 966
- Successor: Ja'far ibn al-Furat; Al-Hasan ibn Ubayd Allah ibn Tughj
- Born: c. 904 – 920
- Died: 22 April 968
- Burial: Al-Quds, Palestine
- Dynasty: Ikhshidid
- Religion: Sunni Islam

Abū al-Misk Kāfūr al-Ikhshīdī (Arabic: أبو المسك كافور الاخشيدي) (?–968), also titled al-Ustādh, was an African eunuch and regent of the Ikhshidid dynasty, and the sole ruler of Egypt and the Levant in his own name from 966 until his death. Originally a black slave, most likely of Nubian origin, his career was sponsored by his master, Muhammad ibn Tughj, who appointed him in distinguished positions and as the tutor of his two sons. After Ibn Tughj's death in 946, Kafur became regent of the Ikhshidid governorship, and was the de facto ruler of autonomous Egypt and parts of the Levant until his death in 948.

== Biography ==
Kafur was a eunuch, and is recorded as having a shiny, dark complexion. The laqab Kafur is antiphrastic, meaning "camphor" in Arabic, contrasting the whiteness of camphor with his dark skin. The kunya Abu al-Misk means "Father of Musk," which may be a pun on the blackness of musk. There is some disagreement on the geographical origins of Kafur; modern studies suggest that he was most likely from Nubia or the Sudan. History of the Patriarchs of Alexandria states that he was “captured in the lands of Nubia,” in accordance with the Egyptian Muslim habit of conducting slave raids in the region. An account relayed by Ibn Zafir has Kafur state that he was brought to Egypt from the Sudan when he was fourteen. The nisba al-Lābi, given to him by the famous poet al-Mutanabbi, points to the province of Lāb in Nubia as his geographic origin. Modern research shows that Kafur’s origins were likely to have been between the Nuba Mountains and the west of the White Nile. Kafur's age is heavily contested, with the years of birth given by medieval historians ranging from 904 to 920. Sources describe his physical appearance as ugly, fat and pot-bellied, with deformed legs.

Kafur was brought to Egypt in 922, when he was over the age of ten, supposedly to the city of Qūṣ in Upper Egypt. Muhammad ibn Tughj, the founder of the Ikhshidid dynasty of Egypt, purchased him as a slave in 923 for the very low price of eighteen dinars. Other accounts state that he was either gifted or taken by Ibn Tughj without payment. The story goes that when a group of exotic animals from Nubia gifted to Ibn Tughj were passing through Fustat, all of the governor's slaves rushed to view the spectacle. Only Kafur was unmoved, keeping his eyes on Ibn Tughj and awaiting any command he might give. Thus, historian Philip Hitti noted, Kafur would be generously rewarded for such loyalty.

Noticing Kafur's intelligence, Ibn Tughj provided him with an education. He was eventually manumitted, and affixed the nisba al-Ikhshīdī to his name. Ibn Tughj appointed Kafur to be the supervisor of princely education for his two sons and sponsored his career as a military officer. Since he was the tutor of the royal children, Kafur was referred to as Ustādh (transl. teacher), a common title for eunuch guardians at the time. As a field commander, Kafur conducted a military mission to Syria in 945. He was put in charge of some campaigns in the Hejaz. Kafur was involved in some diplomatic exchanges between the Ikhshidids and the caliph of Baghdad.

Kafur became the de facto ruler of Egypt in 946 (since Kāfūr was the guardian of bin Tughj's sons, he ruled in their stead upon the death of their father). Though subsequent historians have portrayed him as a just and moderate ruler, he owes a great deal of his fame to the scathing satirical poems directed against him by al-Mutanabbi, a medieval Arab poet.

Kafur died in April 968, and was buried in Jerusalem next to the Ikhshidid emirs, at a location close to the Gate of the Tribes on the Haram al-Sharif.

== Status as former slave ==
Kafur's rise to power, from being an African slave to the ruler of Egypt and parts of Syria, is one of the earliest examples in Islamic history of a sovereign with the lowliest of origins. It had been customary for mamluks to enter the military organization and even reach high positions in it, and many Africans such as Kafur were employed in various occupations and maintained a cohesive culture interacting with that of their hosts.. The distinction was that Kafur far surpassed the rank of general during his career, a position that was more typical for black eunuchs in the same period, and represented the highest point of eunuch political power in the Abbasid era.

== Policies ==
=== Domestic politics ===
While Kafur held real authority over Egypt, he operated behind the façade of Ikhshīdid rulers. On his deathbed, Ibn Tughj had appointed him as guardian over his two sons. In 946, Kafur helped the elder son, Anūdjūr, secure the succession to Ibn Tughj. In 961, he again helped ʿAlī ibn al-Ikhshīd, Anūdjūr's younger brother, secure the Egyptian throne. Only in 966, following the death of ʿAlī, did Kafur publicly declare himself as the sole master of Egypt.

Kafur, despite the tremendous pressure placed upon him, maintained stability inside Egypt. During 947 and 948, he fought and put down the rebellion by Ghalbūn. In 954 he successfully averted an abortive coup d'état by Anūdjūr. He also survived the spread of subversive Ismāʿīlī propaganda against him. His ability to resolve internal political complications is considered as having significantly prolonged the lifespan of the Ikhshidids.

=== Foreign politics ===
One of Kafur's greatest achievements was his successful protection of the Ikhshidid establishment from the Hamdanids (in Syria), Fatimids (in northern Africa, to the west of Egypt), Qarmatians (in the Arabian peninsula), and the Nubians (from Sudan).

Earlier, Kafur's master, Muhammad ibn Tughj, had trusted him to handle the military campaigns of Syria and Hejaz (in the Arabian peninsula). His military and diplomatic measures secured Damascus for the Ikhshidids (from the Hamdanids) in 947. Sayf al-Dawla, governor of Aleppo, had tried to overrun Syria, but his efforts were frustrated by Kafur, and the former recognized the latter's lordship over parts of Syria.

He was also able to delay the Fatimid expansion into Egypt, frustrating the efforts of the latter's agents. So long as Kafur was alive, the Ikhshidid establishment kept the Fatimids at bay; upon his death, the Fatimids took over.

=== Economy ===
Kafur generally maintained economic stability in Egypt, despite serious setbacks:

- A fire devastated the business section of Fustat in 954;
- A major earthquake rocked Egypt in 955 or early 956;
- Recurrence of food-price inflation (sometimes resulting in famine), and consequent civil disturbances, in 949, 952, 955, and 963–968.

Excepting the heavy government expenditure, Kafur's administration refrained from extortionate fiscal practices. His gold coinage displayed remarkable stability, though it did fluctuate. Kafur also enrolled the services of competent administrators and merchants, such as Yaqub ibn Killis, contributing to his economic accomplishments.

== Patronage of the arts ==
Kafur gained popularity by being a patron of scholars and writers. Perhaps the most celebrated patronage, according to A.S. Ehrenkreutz, was that of the poet al-Mutanabbi. In return, al-Mutanabbi praised the former slave. However, after Kafur's failure to reward him with the high office to which he aspired, al-Mutanabbi ridiculed Kāfūr. Thus Kafur was immortalised in the poetry of al-Mutanabbi, who was the greatest poet of Kafur's time, according to Philip Hitti.

As he was a pious man, Kafur was more comfortable with the ulema (Muslim scholarly establishment) than the poets. He surrounded himself with religious men, some of whom he showered with gifts. He constructed two mosques in Giza and on al-Muqattam and a hospital. Nevertheless, he still clung to superstitions, abandoning a home once, believing it to be under a jinn.

Kafur also maintained a magnificent and luxurious court. In addition to the mosques and the hospital, Kafur constructed a number of sumptuous palaces, and the Kāfūriyya gardens in his capital. No archaeological remains of his contributions have been found thus far.

== See also ==
- Slavery in Islam
- List of rulers of Egypt
- History of Egypt

== Sources ==
- Bianquis, Thierry (1998). "Autonomous Egypt from Ibn Ṭūlūn to Kāfūr, 868–969". In Petry, Carl F. (ed.). The Cambridge History of Egypt: Islamic Egypt, 640–1517. Vol. 1. Cambridge: Cambridge University Press. pp. 86–119. ISBN 0-521-47137-0.
- Ehrenkreutz, A. S. (1978). "Kāfūr". In van Donzel, E.; Lewis, B.; Pellat, Ch. & Bosworth, C. E. (eds.). The Encyclopaedia of Islam, Second Edition. Volume IV: Iran–Kha. Leiden: E. J. Brill. pp. 418–419. doi:10.1163/1573-3912_islam_SIM_3781. ISBN 978-90-04-05745-6. OCLC 758278456.
- Fromherz, Allen J. (2012). "Kafur, Abu al-Misk". In Emmanuel Kwaku Akyeampong; Henry Louis Gates Jr. (eds.). Dictionary of African biography. Oxford; New York: Oxford University Press. ISBN 9780195382075.
- van Berchem, Max (1927). Matériaux pour un Corpus Inscriptionum Arabicarum, Deuxième partie: Syrie du Sud. Tome deuxième: Jérusalem "Haram" (in French). Cairo: Imprimerie de l'Institut français d'archéologie oriantele.

Preceded by Abu'l-Hasan Ali ibn al-Ikhshid	Ikhshidid governor of Egypt, southern Syria and the Hejaz (de jure for the Abbasid Caliphate); January 966 – April 968	Succeeded by Abu'l-Fawaris Ahmad ibn Ali
