= Ikhshidid dynasty =

Turkic mamluk dynasty (935–969)

Ikhshidids الإخشيديون
- 935–969
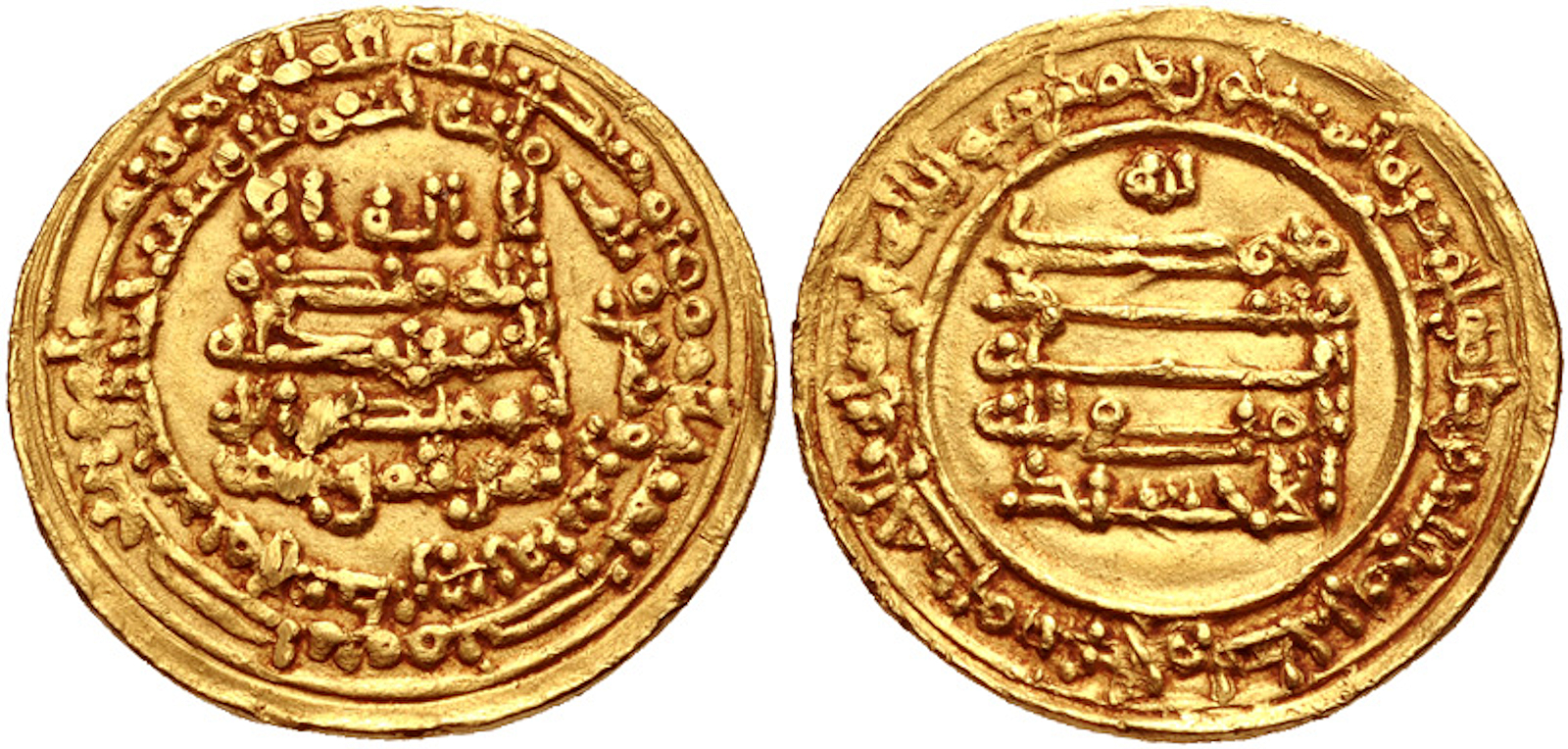
- Coinage of Muhammad al-Ikhshid. Filastin (al-Ramla) mint. Dated AH 332 (943-4 CE).
- Status: Emirate (vassal of the Abbasid Caliphate)
- Capital: Fustat
- Common languages: Arabic (administrative); Coptic (predominant); Western Aramaic; Turkic (army)
- Religion: Islam; Coptic Orthodox (predominant); Maronite Church
- Government: Monarchy
- Wali (governor)
  - 935–946: Muhammad ibn Tughj al-Ikhshid
  - 946–961: Abu'l-Qasim Unujur ibn al-Ikhshid
  - 961–966: Abu'l-Hasan Ali ibn al-Ikhshid
  - 966–968: Abu'l-Misk Kafur
  - 968–969: Abu'l-Fawaris Ahmad ibn Ali ibn al-Ikhshid
- History
  - Established: 935
  - Fatimid conquest: 969
- Currency: Dinar
Preceded by	Succeeded by
Abbasid Caliphate	Fatimid Caliphate

The Ikhshidid dynasty (Arabic: الإخشيديون, romanized: al-Ikhshīdīyūn) was a dynasty of governors of Turkic Mamluk origin, who governed Egypt and parts of the Levant from 935 to 969 on behalf of the Abbasid Caliphate. The dynasty carried the Arabic title "Wāli" reflecting their position as governors on behalf of the Abbasids. The Ikhshidids came to an end when the Fatimid army conquered Fustat in 969. Muhammad ibn Tughj al-Ikhshid, a Turkic Mamluk soldier, was appointed governor by the Abbasid Caliph al-Radi.

The Ikhshidid family tomb was in Jerusalem.

== History ==
=== Origin of the name ===
The name "Ikhshidid" comes from the Central Asian dynastic name Ikhshid, a nobiliary title whose prestige in Central Asia remained high as late as the 10th century. It was adopted by the Turkic commander and ruler of Egypt Muhammad ibn Tughj, whose grandfather had come from Ferghana. After this title, the short-lived dynasty founded by Muhammad al-Ikhshid is known as the Ikhshidid dynasty. Muhammad al-Ikhshidid was from a Turkic military family already serving as mamluks for the Abbasid caliphs for generations.

=== Founding ===
The creation of the Ikhshidid state was part of the wider disintegration and decentralisation of the Abbasids after the Anarchy at Samarra, whereupon government became more decentralised. The founder, Muhammad ibn Tughj al-Ikhshid, possessed some form of military power and was on friendly relations with Mu'nis al-Muzaffar, a powerful military leader. Before he was appointed to Fustat he held the post of governor of Damascus. He was first appointed to the post of Governor of Egypt in 933 but did not enter it during the first stint. In 935 he was appointed a second time to the governorship whilst the country was in a state of war with multiple factions. He launched a campaign to conquer Egypt by land and sea, the naval forces taking Tinnis and able to outflank Ahmad ibn Kayghalagh, the main opponent, forcing his retreat and facilitating ibn Tughj's subsequent entry to Fustat in August. The Fatimids were a major threat at the time and considerable effort was put into repelling them, culminating in their defeat by Ubayd Allah, ibn Tughj's brother, by November 936. There was remarkable stability in the early years, with an absence of economic chaos and Bedouin raids, coupled with prohibition of looting, which helped pacify Egypt. Ibn Tughj sought the honorific title (laqab) of Al-Ikhshīd, which means "King of the Farghanians", from the Abbasids and official designation arrived in July 939.

=== Consolidation ===
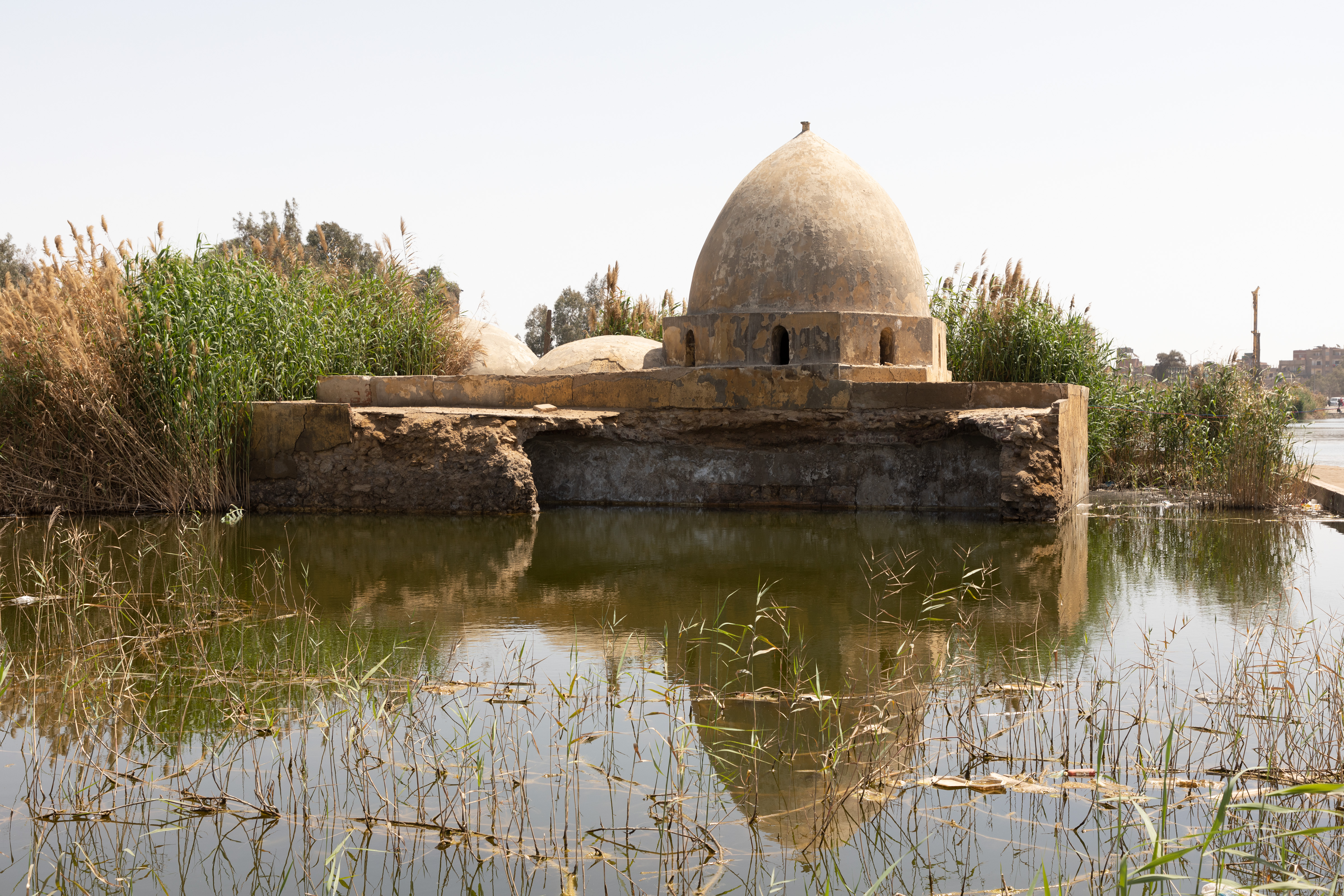
The Mashhad (Mausoleum) of Al-Tabataba (erected in 943 CE) in Cairo is the only remaining monument of the Ikhshidid period.

Muhammad ibn Tughj defeated a Fatimid incursion near Alexandria in 936. Muhammad ibn Ra'iq took over Syria in 939, which threatened Egypt. Enraged, ibn Tughj threatened to recognise the Fatimids, the Abbasids' enemy as the Abbasid caliph did not formally declare for ibn Tughj, the de jure governor. Nonetheless, his simple goals resulted in mainly defensive actions and eventually came to terms with ibn Ra'iq where ibn Tughj would continue to have Egypt and the same for ibn Ra'iq in Syria, partitioned along Ramla-Tiberias. In 944, the governorships of Egypt, Syria and Hijaz were awarded for 30 years to ibn Tughj's family, and these posts would pass to his son, Abu'l-Qasim. In 942 he began striking coins in his own name, and the changes of power in Baghdad meant less central authority. In 945 he defeated Sayf al-Dawla, another adversary who took over Damascus, which resulted in a truce until his death in 946. Abu'l-Qasim inherited the conflict with Sayf al-Dawla and fought him at Damascus, and al-Dawla soon occupied Aleppo in 947. There was a simultaneous revolt by Ghabun, governor of Middle Egypt, who managed to occupy Fustat before his death in the same year. Nonetheless, Kafur's continuation of the appeasement policy managed to negotiate a settlement between the Ikhshidids and the Hamdanids where Damascus became Egyptian again and the tribute to the Hamdanids stopped, with borders largely in line with status quo ante bellum. This peace practically settled the Ikhshidid borders and left the Fatimids again as the main threat, with the Byzantines now the responsibility of the Hamdanids. Kafur wielded real authority following ibn Tughj's death in 946 and was highly regarded among contemporaries.

=== Troubles, decline and conquest by Fatimids ===
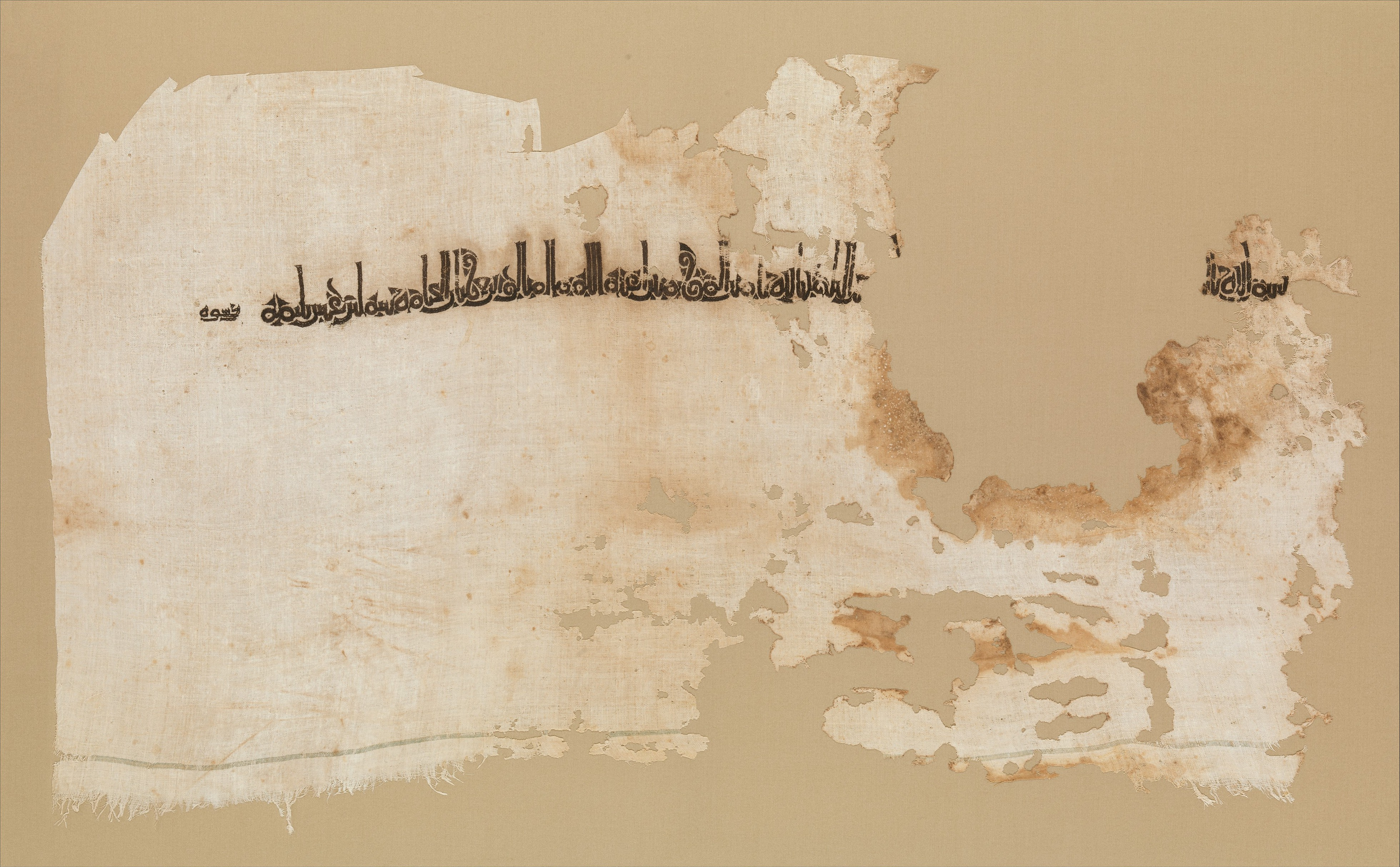
Ikhshidid tiraz band, conferred in the name of the Abbasids in 939-940 CE. The Arabic inscription in Kufic script reads: In the name of God [...] al-Muqtadir billah Commander of the Faithful, may God glorify him. Of what the vizier ordered [in] the private tiraz, year 312/924–925 CE. Kiswa (i.e., garment)." The inscription also contains the names of the caliph al-Radi billah and his vizier Fadl ibn Ja'far as well as the date A.H. 328 (939–40 CE) and the place of manufacture, Damiette, Egypt.

Nubian incursions occurred in 950 and a more serious invasion took place in 965, when Aswan was pillaged. This coincided with the famine of 963–968 while Berbers, Bedouins and Qarmatians all took advantage of the weakened state. In 966 Kafur took over after Abu'l-Hasan's death, which further increased uncertainty due to his status as a eunuch. Nonetheless, he received the title 'Ustādh,' meaning "master", from Baghdad, which gave him some legitimacy. Ibn Killis, Kafur's vizier, was arrested following Kafur's death in 968 and following his release traveled to Fatimid Ifriqiya and provided vital information to them. Only a later attempt by the Fatimid general Jawhar al-Siqilli managed to conquer Egypt in 969. Ubayd Allah, brother of Muhammad ibn Tughj, held out in Syria until March 970, when he was defeated and taken prisoner by Ja'far ibn Fallah.

== List of rulers ==
- Muhammad al-Ikhshid, son of Tughj ibn Juff, a Turkic general of Abbasids, 935–946
- Abu'l-Qasim Unujur, son of al-Ikhshid, 946–961
- Abu'l-Hasan Ali, son of al-Ikhshid, 961–966
- Abu'l-Misk Kafur, slave of al-Ikhshid, 966–968
- Abu'l-Fawaris Ahmad, son of Ali, 968–969

== Family tree ==
Ikhshidid Dynasty

Tughj ibn Juff d. 906
Ubayd Allah	Al-Ikhshid r. 935–946
Al-Hasan	Unujur r. 946–960	Ali r. 960–966	Kafur r. 966–968
Ahmad r. 968–969

== Military ==
Like the Fatimids after them, the Ikhshidids made use of Black slave troops. The practice began with the Tulunids in 870 AD, where the Africans were used as infantrymen, and continued by the Ikhshidids due to financial reasons, as they were cheaper than Turkic military slaves which were used as cavalry.

== Coinage ==
Only gold coins are common, with coppers being extremely rare. Dinars were mainly struck at Misr (Fustat) and Filastin (al-Ramla), and dirhams were usually struck at Filastin, and less often at Tabariya, Dimashq, and Hims. Other mints for dirhams are quite rare. Dinars from Misr are often well struck, while the Filastin dinars are more crude. Dirhams are usually crudely struck and often are illegible on half of the coin.

== See also ==
- List of Sunni Muslim dynasties
- 10th century in Lebanon § The Ikhshidids

== Sources ==
- Bacharach, Jere L. (1993). "Muḥammad b. Ṭug̲h̲d̲j". In Bosworth, C. E.; van Donzel, E.; Heinrichs, W. P. & Pellat, Ch. (eds.). The Encyclopaedia of Islam, Second Edition. Volume VII: Mif–Naz. Leiden: E. J. Brill. p. 411. ISBN 978-90-04-09419-2.
- Bosworth, C. E. (1971). "Ik̲h̲s̲h̲īd". In Lewis, B.; Ménage, V. L.; Pellat, Ch. & Schacht, J. (eds.). The Encyclopaedia of Islam, Second Edition. Volume III: H–Iram. Leiden: E. J. Brill. p. 1060. OCLC 495469525.
- Bosworth, C.E. (1996). The New Islamic Dynasties. Columbia University Press. ISBN 0-231-10714-5.
- Brett, Michael (2002). "The Fatimid Revolution (861-973) and its aftermath in North Africa". In Fage, J. D.; Oliver, Roland Anthony (eds.). The Cambridge History of Africa. Vol. 2. Cambridge University Press. ISBN 978-0521215923.
- Holt, Peter Malcolm (2004). The Crusader States and Their Neighbours, 1098-1291. Pearson Longman. ISBN 978-0-582-36931-3. "The two gubernatorial dynasties in Egypt which have already been mentioned, the Tulunids and the Ikhshidids, were both of Mamluk origin."
- Sears, Stuart D. (2006). "Ikhshidids". In Meri, Josef W. (ed.). Medieval Islamic Civilization. Vol. 1, A–K. Routledge. p. 382. ISBN 9780415966900.
