= Muqtadir =

Given name

Muqtadir مقتدر
- Gender: Male
- Language: Arabic

Origin
- Language: Arabic
- Origin: Names of God in Islam
- Meaning: Dominant, Determiner
- Region of origin: 7th-century Arabian Peninsula; Bengal

Muqtadir or Muktadir (Arabic: مقتدر) is a male Arabic Muslim given name. It is built from the Arabic word Muqtadir. The name means "Dominant" or "Determiner", al-Muqtadir being one of the names of God in the Qur'an, which give rise to the Muslim theophoric names. It is mainly used by Abbasids and Bengalis.

Notable people with the name include:

- al-Muqtadir (895–932), 18th Abbasid caliph
- Umm al-Muqtadir (died 933), Abbasid queen mother
- Ishaq ibn al-Muqtadir (910s–988), Abbasid prince
- Ahmad al-Muqtadir (died 1081), Ruler of Taifa Zaragoza
- Mohammad Abdul Muktadir (1940–1971), Bangladeshi geologist
- Abdul Muqtadir Choudhury (born 1941), Assam Bengali politician
- Dr. A. K. Mohammad Abdul Muqtadir, Bangladeshi ophthalmologist and freedom fighter
- R. A. Mohammad Obaidul Muktadir Chowdhury (born 1955), Bangladeshi government minister
- Ruhul Amin Mohammad Golam Muktadir (died 2020), 5th Director General of Bangladesh Rifles
- Muqtadir Nimji (born 1999), Kenyan squash player

== See also ==
- Müqtədir, Azerbaijan
