= Alam Qahramana =

10th-century Abbasid Harem official

Alam Husn Qahramana

Qahramana of the Abbasid harem
- In office 944–945
- Succeeded by: Thumal

Personal details
- Died: Baghdad, Abbasid Caliphate
- Harem of Caliph: al-Mustakfi

Alam Qahramana (fl. 945) was a courtier of the Abbasid harem during the reign of caliph al-Mustakfi (r. 944–946).

She was originally from Persia and named Husn, before coming to the Abbasid harem. She was a qahramana (stewardess).

She enjoyed great influence during the short reign of Al-Mustakfi. It was said that "Alam became the qahramana of Caliph al-Mustakfi, and she dominated all his affairs". She formed an alliance with the commander of the army, Tuzun (amir al-umara), and together they wielded great influence over the affairs of state, supported by the influence of their respective positions.

According to Meskawayh:

"The court of al-Mustakfi suffered the most humiliating times among the eras of caliphs, because it became under the domination and influence of a Persian woman named Husn. Several corrupt and evil people gathered around her, forming her entourage. She would inspect the hajibs and ghulman of the caliph in a council called the Hudan, where only the vizier had access. As a result of that, the prestige and dignity of the caliphate was torn apart. The court ceremonies were lost, and the palace of the caliph became approachable by many (allowed by her). She wanted to reward Tuzun, so she made the caliph treat him with ceremonies unheard of before this time."

She attempted to form good relations with the Daylami Iranian commanders of the Buyid amir al-umaras, and "She held several banquets in their honour, in the hope they would support the caliph against any opposition".

Her ally Tuzun died shortly before the fall of Al-Mustakfi. When the Emir Mu'izz al-Dawla entered Baghdad in 945, he arrested both her and the caliph. He accused her of having worked against him, had her tongue cut of and seized her money.

She was the last qahramana known to have wielded political influence over the affairs of state.
