= Jijak =

Mother of Abbasid caliph Al-Muktafi

Jijak جيجاك

Umm walad of the Abbasid caliph
- Period: 877/78 – 5 April 900s
- Born: North-Eastern border, Abbasid Caliphate
- Died: c. 900s Baghdad, Abbasid Caliphate
- Burial: Baghdad
- Spouse: al-Mu'tadid
- Children: al-Muktafi
Names
- Umm Ali Jijak
- Religion: Islam

Jijak (Arabic: جيجاك) also known as Umm Ali (Arabic: أم علي) was a Turkic Umm Walad of al-Mu'tadid and the mother of the future caliph al-Muktafi.

== Life ==
Jijak Čiček ("flower" in Turkish) was a Turkic slave-girl, who was a concubine of Ahmad ibn Talha, the future caliph al-Mu'tadid. She gave birth to a son, Ali, in 877/8. After her son's birth she received the named Umm Ali, meaning mother of Ali and the name became like a common name for her.

Her son was the first caliph named after caliph Ali. Jijak's allowance were increased when al-Mu'tadid became caliph in 892. Al-Mu'tadid also took care to prepare her son Ali, because he was his oldest son and heir-apparent, for the succession by appointing him as a provincial governor: first in Rayy, Qazvin, Qum and Hamadan, when these provinces in c. 894/5, and in 899 over the Jazira and the frontier areas, her son Ali al-Muktafi took up residence at Raqqa. The favourite city of his Abbasid ancestors.

Jijak became an important and influential Umm walad of the Abbasid harem because of her merit as the mother of elder and nominated heir of al-Mu'tadid.

She died around 900s, before or shortly after her son's ascension to the Caliphate. After her death her rival Shaghab took attention in the Harem. Even though Jijak was influential she never aspire for any kind of political power.

== See also ==
- Shaghab

== Sources ==
- Zetterstéen, K. V. & Bosworth, C. E. (1993). "al-Muktafī". In Bosworth, C. E.; van Donzel, E.; Heinrichs, W. P. & Pellat, Ch. (eds.). The Encyclopaedia of Islam, Second Edition. Volume VII: Mif–Naz. Leiden: E. J. Brill. pp. 542–543. ISBN 978-90-04-09419-2.
- Hasan, M. (1998). History of Islam: Classical period, 571-1258 C.E. History of Islam. Islamic Publications. p. 249.
- Rosenthal, Franz, ed. (1985). The History of al-Ṭabarī, Volume XXXVIII: The Return of the Caliphate to Baghdad: The Caliphates of al-Muʿtaḍid, al-Muktafī and al-Muqtadir, A.D. 892–915/A.H. 279–302. SUNY Series in Near Eastern Studies. Albany, New York: State University of New York Press. ISBN 978-0-87395-876-9.
- Özaydın, Abdülkerim (2006). "Müktefî-Billâh". TDV Encyclopedia of Islam, Vol. 31 (Muhammedi̇yye – Münâzara) (in Turkish). Istanbul: Presidency of Religious Affairs, Centre for Islamic Studies. pp. 534–536. ISBN 978-975-389-458-6.
