= Gharib al-Khal =

Gharib ibn Abdallah, surnamed al-Khal ('the Maternal Uncle'), was the brother of Shaghab, the influential mother of Abbasid caliph al-Muqtadir (r. 908–932), and a powerful figure in his nephew's court. He was one of the most prominent military commanders of the time, and served as governor of the Syrian frontier with the Byzantine Empire in 910, and of Eastern Arabia in 912. In the sources, he is often mentioned in tandem with the Abbasid commander-in-chief, Mu'nis al-Muzaffar, as the most powerful men of the state. When he died in 917, the entire court attended his funeral. His offspring also attained prominent roles at court, especially his son, Harun ibn Gharib al-Khal.

== Sources ==
- Bowen, Harold (1928). The Life and Times of ʿAlí Ibn ʿÍsà, ‘The Good Vizier’. Cambridge: Cambridge University Press. OCLC 386849.
- El Cheikh, Nadia Maria (2013). "The Harem". Crisis and Continuity at the Abbasid Court: Formal and Informal Politics in the Caliphate of al-Muqtadir (295-320/908-32). Leiden: BRILL. pp. 165–185. ISBN 978-90-04-25271-4.
