= Nimji =

Nimji is a surname. Notable people with this surname include:

- Khaaliqa Nimji (born 1998), Kenyan squash player
- Muqtadir Nimji (born 1999), Kenyan squash player
