= Umm Musa al-Hashimiyya =

10th-century Abbasid Harem official

Umm Musa al-Hashimiyya أم موسى الهاشمية

Qahramana of the Abbasid harem
- In office 911–922
- Succeeded by: Thumal

Personal details
- Died: Baghdad, Abbasid Caliphate
- Relatives: Niece
- Harem of Caliph: al-Muqtadir

Umm Musa al-Hashimiyya (Arabic: أم موسى الهاشمية) (9th-century - fl. 923) was a courtier of the Abbasid harem during the reign of Caliph Al-Muqtadir (r. 908–929). Umm Musa is known as one of the most powerful of the women in the office of qahramana (stewardess), which was the most powerful office of the women in the Abbasid harem.

== Life ==
She was a member of a minor branch of the Hashemite family.

In 911, the Caliph appointed her to the office of qahramana, or personal agent of the mother of Shaghab, mother of Al-Muqtadir. She replaced her predecessor, Qahramana Fatima, who drowned in the Tigris when her boat was caught in a storm. She was responsible for the purse of the harem, and managed the costs of the harem women, staff and the princes, and she was credited for having reduced the cost of the harem by 45.000 dinars a month.

She became the center of a major patronage network. She was engaged as an intermediary by various supplicants who wished to seek contact with Caliph and his mother for both political and financial reasons, thus indirectly causing many political events. In 912 for example, vizier Abu'l-Hasan Ali ibn al-Furat was arrested and deposed after Umm Musa informed the Caliph of a plot on the assignment by Muhammed b. Khaqan. She recommended Ibn ab Bach as vizier to the Caliph with the help of his mother, and had an argument with the Caliph when he appointed another man instead. She managed to have vizier Ali b. Isa deposed by allying with the Caliph mother.

Her plotting for her favourites, the corruption of her family, and her hostility towards the "good vizier" Ali ibn Isa al-Jarrah, who was dismissed due to her machinations in 917, are underlined in the chronicles of the period. In 914, she managed to have her brother Ahmand appointed naqib.

When she married her niece to Abu'l-Abbas, a grandson of al-Mutawakkil (r. 847–861), her rivals were quick to accuse her of aspiring to overthrow the Caliph and place her nephew on the throne. The Caliph's mother accused her of planning to depose the Caliph and replace him with her son-in-law or grandson with the help of the fortune and contacts she had secured. In 922/3, she was arrested and replaced by Thumal, who tortured Umm Musa, her brother, and her sister, until they had revealed where her treasure—reportedly valued at one million gold dinars—was hidden.

She was deposed from her position because of disloyalty.
