= Zaydan Qahramana =

10th-century Abbasid Harem official

Zaydan Qahramana زيدان القهرمانة

Qahramana of the Abbasid harem
- Monarch: al-Muqtadir
- Preceded by: Umm Musa al-Hashimiyya

Personal details
- Died: Baghdad, Abbasid Caliphate

Zaydan the qahramana (Arabic: زيدان القهرمانة 10th-century) was a courtier of the Abbasid harem during the reign of caliph al-Muqtadir (r. 908–932).

She was taken as a slave and placed in the Abbasid harem, where she was given the office of qahramana (stewardess). The qahramana's acted as the intermediaries of the women of the harem and the outside world, was assigned a number of different tasks such as managing economic and judicial affairs of the harem, and was the most influential of the offices a woman could have.

Zaydan is known as one of the most powerful of the qahramanas. She was assigned to be the guardian of the state jewels.

She acted as the jailkeeper of high status prisoners. High status prisoners were placed in comfortable house arrest in her home. Among the prisoners she guarded was governor Ibn Abi al-Saj in 919, Hamid ibn al-Abbas in 923 and vizier al-Khasibi in 927. This enabled her to form a net of contacts among influential officials, and act as an intermediary between them and the Caliph.

One of the most famous of her prisoners were the vizier Ibn al-Furat, who was placed in her care after he had fallen out of favor. She managed to have him restored to power through her harem contacts. She was rewarded by him with lands and wealth, and they formed a mutually favorable alliance which continued for the rest of their careers, with him addressing her as "sister". Because of this, al-Furat's successor Hamid ibn al-Abbas said about him: "you depended on the qahramana...to plead your case and defend you..."
