= Vələmir =

- Location within Azerbaijan
- Coordinates: 41°39′46″N 48°45′37″E
- Country: Azerbaijan
- Rayon: Khachmaz
- Municipality: Müqtədir
- Time zone: UTC+4 (AZT)
  - Summer (DST): UTC+5 (AZT)

Vələmir (also, Velamir and Velemir) is a village in the Khachmaz Rayon of Azerbaijan. The village forms part of the municipality of Müqtədir.
