= İstisu (Khachmaz) =

- Municipality
- Location within Azerbaijan
- Coordinates: 41°39′51″N 48°46′50″E
- Country: Azerbaijan
- Rayon: Khachmaz

Population
  - Total: 2,236
- Time zone: UTC+4 (AZT)
  - Summer (DST): UTC+5 (AZT)

İstisu (till 2018 Müqtədir, also, Mukhtadir or Muxtedir) is a coastal town and municipality in the Khachmaz Rayon of Azerbaijan. It has a population of 2,236. The municipality consists of the İstisu town and Vələmir village.
