= Thumal the Qahraman =

Abbasid Judge of Mazalim (918–929)

Thumal the Qahraman ثمل القهرمانة

Abbasid Judge of Mazalim
- In office 918–928/929
- Monarch: al-Muqtadir

Personal details
- Born: c. 890s or 900s Baghdad, Abbasid Caliphate (now Iraq)
- Died: c. 929 Baghdad, Abbasid Caliphate
- Cause of death: illness (natural)
- Religion: Sunni Islam

Thumal the Qahraman (Arabic: ثمل القهرمانة) (died 929) was a Muslim woman appointed in 918 as a judge in a maẓālim (secular administrative) court during the reign of Caliph al-Muqtadir (r. 908–932). She was not a Qadi (a judge adjudicating Islamic law), for she only dealt with secular law. She was put in charge of rescripting the petitions which petitioners brought to the court. Her position was an extraordinary unique for her sex. She was appointed by Umm Jafar Muqtadir, the mother to caliph Jafar al-Muqtadir-billah (r. 908–923), the eighteenth Abbasid caliph.

== Life ==
Thumal was originally the qahramāna-assistant of Shaghab, mother of Caliph al-Muqtadir.

When Shaghab secured the succession of her son to the throne, she de facto seized power and appointed a parallel bureaucracy to handle state affairs. Shaghab stated that the affairs of the ummah, especially justice, was better administered with a woman in charge. In 918 she appointed Thumal in charge of mazalim, in effect minister of justice or chief administrator of justice, and supervisor of the qadis. The qadis opposed to be supervised by a woman, but was forced to accept the appointment.

According to the historian Tabari, Thumal carried out her duties well enough to achieve popularity among the public in her office, especially because of reforms which lowered the cost for a plaintiff to initiate a case. However, her appointment was described in Muslim history, among others by Ibn Hazm, as one example of a series of "scandals whose equal has not been seen to this day".

== See also ==
- Women in islam
- Qadi
