= Al-Muqtadir =

18th Abbasid Caliph (r. 908–932)

Abū’l-Faḍl Jaʿfar ibn Aḥmad Al-Muqtadir bi'Llāh أبو الفضل جعفر بن أحمد المقتدر بالله
- Caliph; Commander of the Faithful
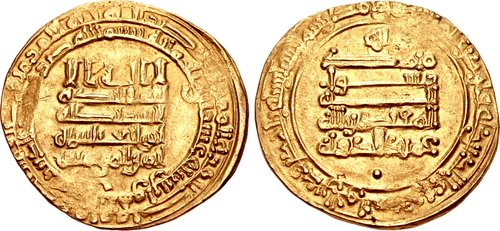
- Gold dinar of al-Muqtadir with the names of his heir Abu'l-Abbas and the vizier Amid al-Dawla

18th Caliph of the Abbasid Caliphate
- Reign: 13 August 908 – 28 February 929
- Predecessor: al-Muktafi
- Successor: al-Qahir
- Reign: 2 March 929 – 31 October 932 (second period)
- Born: 13 November 895; Baghdad, Abbasid Caliphate
- Died: 31 October 932 (aged 36); Baghdad, Abbasid Caliphate
- Burial: Baghdad
- Consort: Hurra bint Badr; Zalum; Khalub; Dimna; Mash'ala; Khamrah
- Issue: al-Radi; al-Muttaqi; al-Muti'; Harun; Ishaq; Isa; Ibrahim
Names
- Abū’l-Faḍl Jaʿfar ibn Aḥmad ibn Ṭalḥa ibn Jaʿfar ibn Muḥammad ibn Hārūn Al-Muqtadir bi'Llāh
- Dynasty: Abbasid
- Father: al-Mu'tadid
- Mother: Shaghab
- Religion: Sunni Islam

Abū’l-Faḍl Jaʿfar ibn Aḥmad ibn Ṭalḥa ibn Jaʿfar ibn Muḥammad ibn Hārūn Al-Muqtadir bi'Llāh (Arabic: أبو الفضل جعفر بن أحمد المقتدر بالله) (895 – 31 October 932 AD), better known by his regnal name al-Muqtadir bi'Llāh (Arabic: المقتدر بالله, "Mighty in God"), was the eighteenth caliph of the Abbasid Caliphate from 908 to 932 AD (295–320 AH), with the exception of a brief deposition in favour of al-Qahir in 929.

He came to the throne at the age of 13, the youngest Caliph in Abbasid history, as a result of palace intrigues. His accession was soon challenged by the supporters of the older and more experienced Abdallah ibn al-Mu'tazz, but their attempted coup in December 908 was quickly and decisively crushed. Al-Muqtadir enjoyed a longer rule than any of his predecessors, but was uninterested in government. Affairs were run by his officials, although the frequent change of viziers—fourteen changes of the head of government are recorded for his reign—hampered the effectiveness of the administration. The Abbasid harem, where his mother, Shaghab, exercised total control, also exercised a frequently decisive influence on affairs, and especially on the advancement or dismissal of officials. After a period of consolidation and recovery under his father al-Mu'tadid and older half-brother al-Muktafi, al-Muqtadir's reign marks the onset of rapid decline. The full treasury inherited by al-Muqtadir was quickly emptied, and financial difficulties would become a persistent feature of the caliphal government. Ifriqiya fell to the Fatimids, although the commander-in-chief Mu'nis al-Muzaffar was able to repel their attempts to conquer Egypt as well. Nearer to Iraq, the Hamdanids became autonomous masters of the Jazira and the Qarmatians re-emerged as a major threat, culminating in their capture of Mecca in 929. The forces of the Byzantine Empire, under John Kourkouas, began a sustained offensive into the borderlands of the Thughur and Armenia. As a result, in February 929 a palace revolt briefly replaced al-Muqtadir with his brother al-Qahir. The new regime failed to consolidate itself, however, and after a few days al-Muqtadir was restored. The commander-in-chief, Mu'nis al-Muzaffar, was by then a virtual dictator. Urged by his enemies, al-Muqtadir attempted to get rid of him in 932, but Mu'nis marched with his troops on Baghdad, and in the ensuing battle on 31 October 932 al-Muqtadir was killed.

== Birth and background ==
The future al-Muqtadir was born on 14 November 895, as the second son of Caliph al-Mu'tadid (r. 892–902). His mother was the Byzantine slave concubine Shaghab. Al-Mu'tadid was the son of al-Muwaffaq, an Abbasid prince who became the Caliphate's main military commander, and de facto regent, during the rule of his brother, al-Mu'tamid (r. 870–892). Al-Muwaffaq's power relied on his close ties with the ghilmān, the foreign-born "slave-soldiers" that now provided the professional mainstay of the Abbasid army. The ghilmān were highly proficient militarily, but also very expensive, and a potential political danger, as their first priority was securing their pay; alien to the mainstream of Muslim society, the ghilmān had no compunctions about overthrowing a vizier or even a caliph to secure their aims, as demonstrated during the "Anarchy at Samarra" (861–870), when five caliphs succeeded one another.

Caliphal authority in the provinces collapsed during the "Anarchy at Samarra", with the result that by the 870s the central government had lost effective control over most of the Caliphate outside the metropolitan region of Iraq. In the west, Egypt had fallen under the control of Ahmad ibn Tulun, who also disputed control of Syria with al-Muwaffaq, while Khurasan and most of the Islamic East had been taken over by the Saffarids, who replaced the Abbasids' loyal governor Muhammad ibn Tahir. Most of the Arabian peninsula was likewise lost to local potentates, while in Tabaristan a radical Zaydi Shi'a dynasty took power. Even in Iraq, the rebellion of the Zanj slaves threatened Baghdad itself, and further south the Qarmatians were a nascent threat. Until his death in 891, al-Muwaffaq was engaged in a constant struggle to avert complete collapse, but managed to suppress the Zanj and repel the Saffarids. Upon his death, his son assumed his powers, and when Caliph al-Mu'tamid died in 892, he usurped the throne from his sons. Al-Mu'tadid would prove to be the epitome of the "warrior-caliph", spending most of his reign on campaign. He managed to overthrow the local dynasts who had seized power during the Anarchy and restore control over the Jazira, the frontier towns of the Thughur, and the Jibal, but his attempts to capture Fars and Kirman were unsuccessful. In other areas, however, the fragmentation of the Islamic world continued: the Sajid dynasty was established in Adharbayjan, the Armenian princes became de facto independent, Yemen was lost to a local Zaydi dynasty, and a new radical sect, the Qarmatians, emerged and in 899 seized Bahrayn. His successor, al-Muqtadir's older half-brother al-Muktafi, was a more sedentary figure but continued al-Mu'tamid's policies, and was able to score a major victory over the Qarmatians, and reconquer the Tulunid domains.

All this came at the cost of gearing the state towards war: according to the historian Hugh N. Kennedy, based on a treasury document from the time of al-Mu'tadid's accession, "out of the total expenditure of 7915 dinars per day, some 5121 are entirely military, 1943 in areas (like riding animals and stables) which served both military and non-military and only 851 in areas like the bureaucracy and the harem which can be described as truly civilian (though even in this case, the bureaucrats' main purpose seems to have been to arrange the payment of the army). It seems reasonable to conclude that something over 80 per cent of recorded government expenditure was devoted to maintaining the army." Paying the army thus became the chief concern of the government, but it became an increasingly difficult proposition as the outlying provinces were lost. The situation was further exacerbated by the fact that in the remaining provinces, semi-autonomous governors, grandees and members of the dynasty were able to establish virtual latifundia, aided by the system of muqāṭa'a, a form of tax farming in exchange for a fixed tribute, which they often failed to pay. Even the revenues of the Sawad, the rich agricultural lands of Iraq, are known to have declined considerably at the time. Nevertheless, through stringent economy, and despite near-constant warfare, both al-Mu'tadid and al-Muktafi were able to leave a full treasury behind. Thus the restored Caliphate at the time of al-Muktafi's death was less than half the size than in its heyday under Harun al-Rashid (r. 786–809), but it remained a powerful and viable state, with an army that, "though it was very expensive, was probably the most effective in the Muslim world", and an almost unchallenged legitimacy as the true successors of Muhammad.

== Accession ==
In 908, al-Muktafi fell ill, and was evidently nearing his end. The issue of succession had been left open, and with the Caliph incapacitated, the vizier al-Abbas ibn al-Hasan al-Jarjara'i took it upon himself to seek out a successor. Two different versions are told of the events: Miskawayh reports that the vizier sought the advice of the most important bureaucrats (kuttāb, sing. kātib), with Mahmud ibn Dawud ibn al-Jarrah suggesting the older and experienced Abdallah ibn al-Mu'tazz, but Ali ibn al-Furat—who is usually portrayed as a villain by Miskawayh—proposing instead the thirteen-year-old Ja'far al-Muqtadir as someone weak, pliable, and easily manipulated by the senior officials. The vizier also consulted Ali ibn Isa al-Jarrah, who refused to choose, and Muhammad ibn Abdun, whose opinion has not been recorded. In the end, the vizier concurred with Ibn al-Furat, and on al-Muktafi's death Ja'far was proclaimed as heir and brought to the caliphal palace; when the testament of al-Muktafi was opened, he too had chosen his brother as his successor. A different story is reported by the Andalusi historian Arib, whereby the vizier dithered between the candidacies of Ibn al-Mu'tazz and another older Abbasid prince, Muhammad ibn al-Mu'tamid. The choice of the latter would represent a major political departure, in effect a repudiation of al-Mu'tadid's coup that had deprived the offspring of al-Mu'tamid from power, and of the officials and ghilmān that had underpinned al-Mu'tadid's regime. The vizier indeed inclined towards Muhammad, but the latter prudently chose to await al-Muktafi's death before accepting. Indeed, the Caliph recovered, and was informed that people were discussing both Ibn al-Mu'tazz and Ibn al-Mu'tamid as his possible successors. This worried al-Muktafi, who in the presence of the qāḍīs as witnesses officially nominated Ja'far as his heir, before dying. The two stories highlight different aspects of al-Muqtadir's accession: on the one hand, a cabal of officials choosing a weak and pliable ruler, "a sinister development" that inaugurated one "of the most disastrous reigns in the whole of Abbasid history [...] a quarter of a century in which all of the work of [al-Muqtadir's] predecessors would be undone", while on the other hand, the issue of dynastic succession, and especially the loyalty of al-Mu'tadid's ghilmān to his family, evidently also played an important role.

Al-Muqtadir's succession was unopposed, and proceeded with the customary ceremonies. The full treasury bequeathed by al-Mu'tadid and al-Muktafi meant that the donatives to the troops could easily be paid, as well as reviving the old practice of gifts to the members of the Hashimite families. The new caliph was also able to display his largess, and solicitude for his subjects, when he ordered the demolition of a suq erected by his predecessor near Bab al-Taq, where the merchants were forced to pay rent, instead of being able to offer their wares freely as before. This benefited the poor of the capital.

=== Suppression of the revolt of Ibn al-Mu'tazz ===
Nevertheless, the intrigues surrounding his accession had not abated. The supporters of Ibn al-Mu'tazz in particular remained determined to get their candidate on the throne. According to Arib, the vizier al-Abbas had been one of the chief conspirators, but had begun to acquiesce to al-Muqtadir's rule, hoping to control him. His increasingly arrogant behaviour spurred the other conspirators on, and on 16 December 908, the Hamdanid commander al-Husayn ibn Hamdan led a group of men that killed the vizier as he was riding to his garden. The conspirators then sought to seize the young caliph as well, but the latter had managed to flee to the Hasani Palace, where he barricaded himself with his supporters. The ḥājib (chamberlain) Sawsan was the driving force behind the loyalists' resistance, urging the commanders Safi al-Hurami, Mu'nis al-Khadim, and Mu'nis al-Khazin, to defend the caliph. Al-Husayn tried the entire morning to gain entrance, but failed; and then abruptly, and without notifying his fellow conspirators, fled the city to his home of Mosul. In the meantime, the other conspirators, led by Mahmud ibn Dawud ibn al-Jarrah, had assembled in a house and proclaimed Ibn al-Mu'tazz as caliph. This had the support of some of the qāḍīs, who regarded al-Muqtadir's accession as illegal, but others were opposed, reflecting the uncertainty and indecision of the conspirators themselves. Along with Ibn Hamdan's departure, this indecision allowed al-Muqtadir's followers to regain the upper hand: Mu'nis al-Khadim led his ghilmān on boats across the Tigris to the house where Ibn al-Mu'tazz and the conspirators had gathered, and dispersed them—Arib records that Mu'nis' troops attacked the assembled supporters of Ibn al-Mu'tazz with arrows, while Miskawayh claims that they fled as soon as the troops appeared.

Whatever the true events, the coup collapsed swiftly. Ali ibn al-Furat, the only one among the leading kuttāb to not have had any contact with the conspirators, was named vizier. Muhammad ibn al-Jarrah remained a fugitive and a price was placed on his head. Ibn al-Furat tried to limit retaliations and several of the prisoners were released, but many of the conspirators were executed. The troops, whose loyalty had been decisive, received another donative equal to that of the accession. The ḥājib Sawsan, however, was soon purged, as he grew arrogant and overbearing: he was arrested by Safi al-Hurami and died under house arrest a few days later.

== Reign ==
=== The queen-mother Shaghab and the harem ===
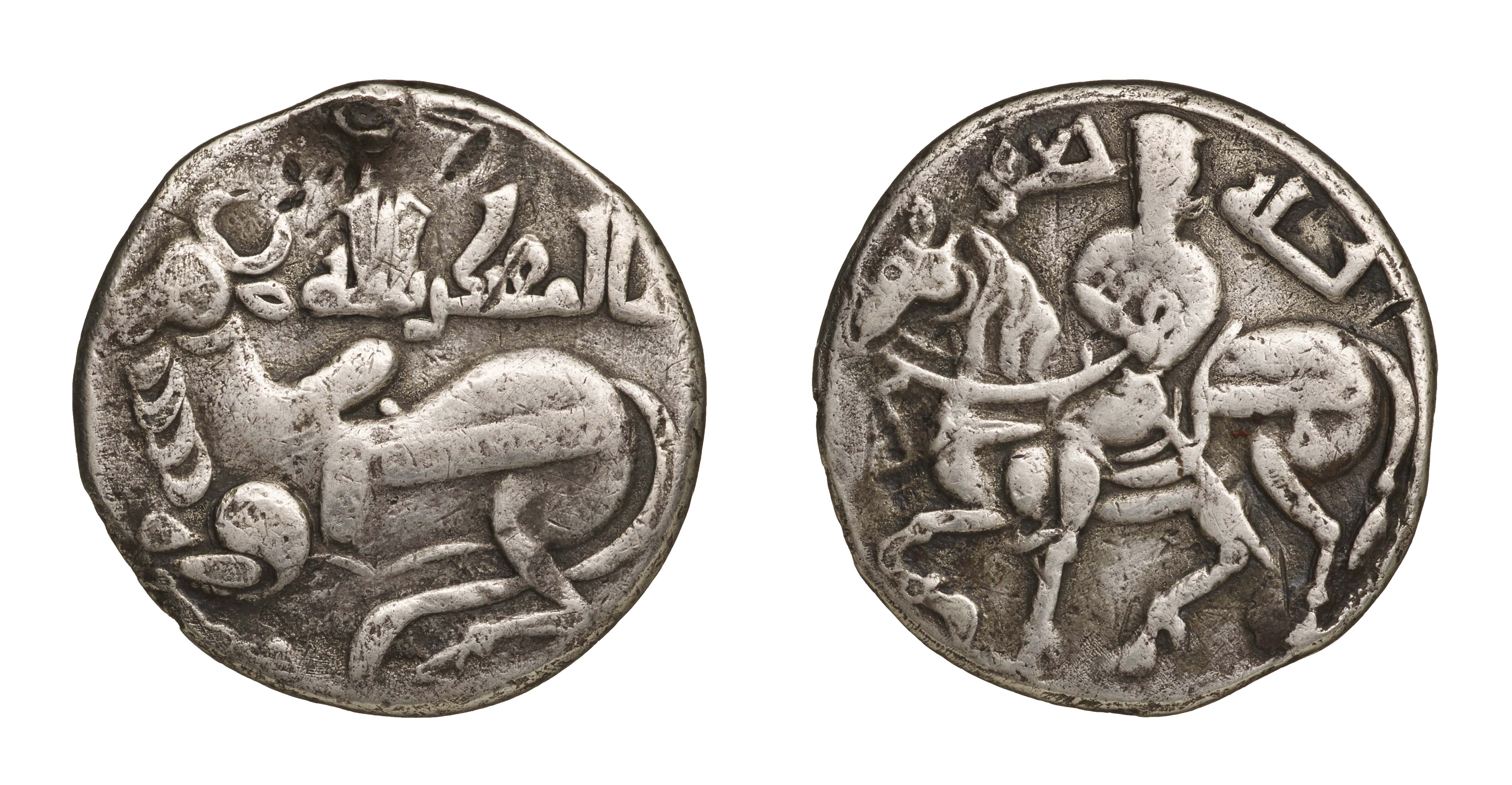
Silver dirham in the name of al-Muqtadir, on the model of the coinage of the Hindu Shahis.

Al-Muqtadir was the first underage Caliph in Muslim history, and as such during the early years of his reign, a regency council (al-sāda, "the masters") was set up, comprising, according to al-Tanukhi, his mother Shaghab, her personal agent (qahramāna) Umm Musa, her sister Khatif, and another former concubine of al-Mu'tadid's, Dastanbuwayh. Saghab, usually known simply as al-Sayyida ("the Lady"), utterly "dominated her son to the exclusion of the other women in his harem, including his wives and concubines"; al-Muqtadir would spend much of his time in his mother's quarters. As a result, government business came to be determined in the private quarters of the sovereign rather than the public palace dominated by the bureaucracy, and Saghab became one of the most influential figures of her son's reign, interfering in the appointments and dismissals of officials, making financial contributions to the treasury, and undertaking charitable activities. Indeed, a common feature of all accounts by medieval sources is that "mentions of al-Muqtadir are indissolubly tied to mentions not only of his viziers, but also of his female household", and this was one of the main points of criticism for subsequent historians. Thus the contemporary historian al-Mas'udi condemned al-Muqtadir's reign as one where "those who had power were women, servants and others", while the Caliph himself "did not concern himself with State affairs", leaving his officials to govern the state. Likewise, the 13th-century chronicler Ibn al-Tiqtaqa, regarded al-Muqtadir as a "squanderer" for whom "matters concerning his reign were run by women and servants, while he was busy satisfying his pleasure". Shaghab in particular is usually portrayed as a "rapacious and short-sighted schemer" by later historians.

Shaghab spent most of her life confined in the harem, where she had her own parallel bureaucracy, with her own kuttāb devoted to both civil and military affairs. Her power was such that when her secretary Ahmad al-Khasibi was appointed vizier in 925 due to her own and her sister's influence, he regretted the appointment, since his post as kātib to the queen-mother was more beneficial to himself. The most important members of her court were the stewardesses or qahramāna, who were free to exit the harem and act as her agents in the outside world. These women wielded considerable influence, especially as intermediaries between the harem and the court; their influence with Shaghab could lead to the dismissal of even the viziers. The first incumbent was one Fatima, who drowned in the Tigris when her boat was caught in a storm. She was followed by Umm Musa, a descendant of one of the Abbasid clan's junior branches. Her plotting for her favourites, the corruption of her family, and her hostility towards the "good vizier" Ali ibn Isa al-Jarrah, who was dismissed due to her machinations in 917, are underlined in the chronicles of the period. However, when she married her niece to Abu'l-Abbas, a grandson of al-Mutawakkil (r. 847–861), her rivals were quick to accuse her of aspiring to overthrow the Caliph and place her nephew on the throne. In 922/3, she was arrested and replaced by Thumal, who tortured Umm Musa, her brother, and her sister, until they had revealed where her treasure—reportedly valued at one million gold dinars—was hidden. Thumal enjoyed a reputation for cruelty; her first master, Abu Dulaf, had used her to punish servants who displeased him. Another qahramāna, Zaydan, was the antithesis of Thumal: her house was used to jail several senior officials after they were dismissed, but it was a comfortable captivity, and she often provided refuge to those persecuted by their political rivals.

=== Policies and events ===
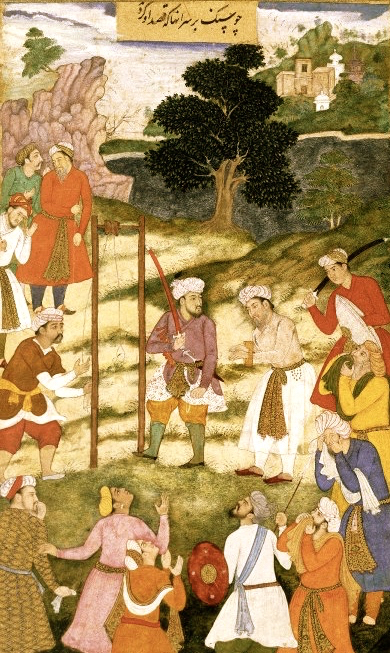
The execution of Mansur al-Hallaj at the behest of al-Muqtadir on 26 March 922, as represented in a 17th-century Mughal Indian painting.

The stand that had been made during the last four reigns to stay the decline of the Abbasid power at last came to an end. From al-Muqtadir's reign on, the Abbasids would decline. Yet, at the same time, many names that would become famous in the world of literature and science lived during this and the following reigns. Among the best known are: Ishaq ibn Hunayn (d. 911) (son of Hunayn ibn Ishaq), a physician and translator of Greek philosophical works into Arabic; ibn Fadlan, explorer; al Battani (d. 923), astronomer; al-Tabari (d. 923), historian and theologian; al-Razi (d. 930), a philosopher who made fundamental and lasting contributions to the fields of medicine and chemistry; al-Farabi (d. 950), chemist and philosopher; Abu Nasr Mansur (d. 1036), mathematician; Alhazen (d. 1040), mathematician; al-Biruni (d. 1048), mathematician, astronomer, physicist; Omar Khayyám (d. 1123), poet, mathematician, and astronomer; and Mansur al-Hallaj, a mystic, writer and teacher of Sufism most famous for his self-proclaimed attainment of unity with God (which was misunderstood and disputed as divinity), his poetry, and for his execution for heresy by al-Muqtadir, on 23 Dhu 'l-Qa'da (March 25th).

By the time of al-Muqtadir's reign, there had been war for some years between the Muslims and the Greeks in Asia, with heavy losses for the most part on the side of the Muslims, many of whom were taken prisoner. The Byzantine frontier, however, began to be threatened by Bulgarian hordes. So the Byzantine Empress Zoe Karbonopsina sent two ambassadors to Baghdad with the view of securing an armistice and arranging for the ransom of the Muslim prisoners. The embassy was graciously received and peace restored. A sum of 120,000 golden pieces was paid for the freedom of the captives. All this only added to the disorder of the city. The people, angry at the success of the "Infidels" in Asia Minor and at similar losses in Persia, complained that the Caliph cared for none of these things and, instead of seeking to restore the prestige of Islam, passed his days and nights with slave-girls and musicians. Uttering such reproaches, they threw stones at the Imam, as in the Friday service he named the Caliph in the public prayers.

On 21 June 921 (11 safar AH 309), a diplomatic party led by Susan al-Rassi, a eunuch in the caliph's court, left Baghdad. Primarily, the purpose of their mission was to explain Islamic law to the recently converted Bulgar peoples living on the eastern bank of the Volga River in what is now Russia. Additionally, the embassy was sent in response to a request by the king of the Volga Bulgars to help them against their enemies, the Khazars. Ibn Fadlan served as the group's religious advisor and lead counselor for Islamic religious doctrine and law.

Ahmad ibn Fadlan and the diplomatic party utilized established caravan routes toward Bukhara but instead of following that route all the way to the east, they turned northward in what is now northeastern Iran. Leaving the city of Gurgan near the Caspian Sea, they crossed lands belonging to a variety of Turkic peoples, notably the Khazar Khaganate, Oghuz Turks on the east coast of the Caspian, the Pechenegs on the Ural River and the Bashkirs in what is now central Russia, but the largest portion of his account is dedicated to the Rus Vikings on the Volga trade route. All told, the delegation covered some 4000 kilometers (2500 mi).

Some twelve years later, al-Muqtadir was subjected to the indignity of deposition. The leading courtiers having conspired against him, he was forced to abdicate in favour of his brother al-Qahir, but, after scenes of rioting and plunder, and loss of thousands of lives, the conspirators found that they were not supported by the troops. Al-Muqtadir, who had been kept in safety, was again placed upon the throne. The state's finances fell after this event into so wretched a state that nothing was left with which to pay the city guards. Al-Muqtadir was eventually slain outside the city gate in 320 AH (932 AD).

Al-Muqtadir's long reign had brought the Abbasids to their lowest ebb. Northern Africa was lost and Egypt nearly. Mosul had thrown off its dependence and the Greeks could make raids at pleasure along the poorly protected borders. Yet in the East formal recognition of the Caliphate remained in place, even by those who virtually claimed their independence; and nearer home, the terrible Carmathians had been for the time put down. In Baghdad, al-Muqtadir, the mere tool of a venal court, was at the mercy of foreign guards, who, commanded for the most part by Turkish and other officers of foreign descent, were frequently breaking out into rebellion. Because of al-Muqtadir's ineffective rule, the prestige which his immediate predecessors had regained was lost, and the Abbasid throne became again the object of contempt at home and a tempting prize for attack from abroad.

=== Rivalry between his Court officials ===
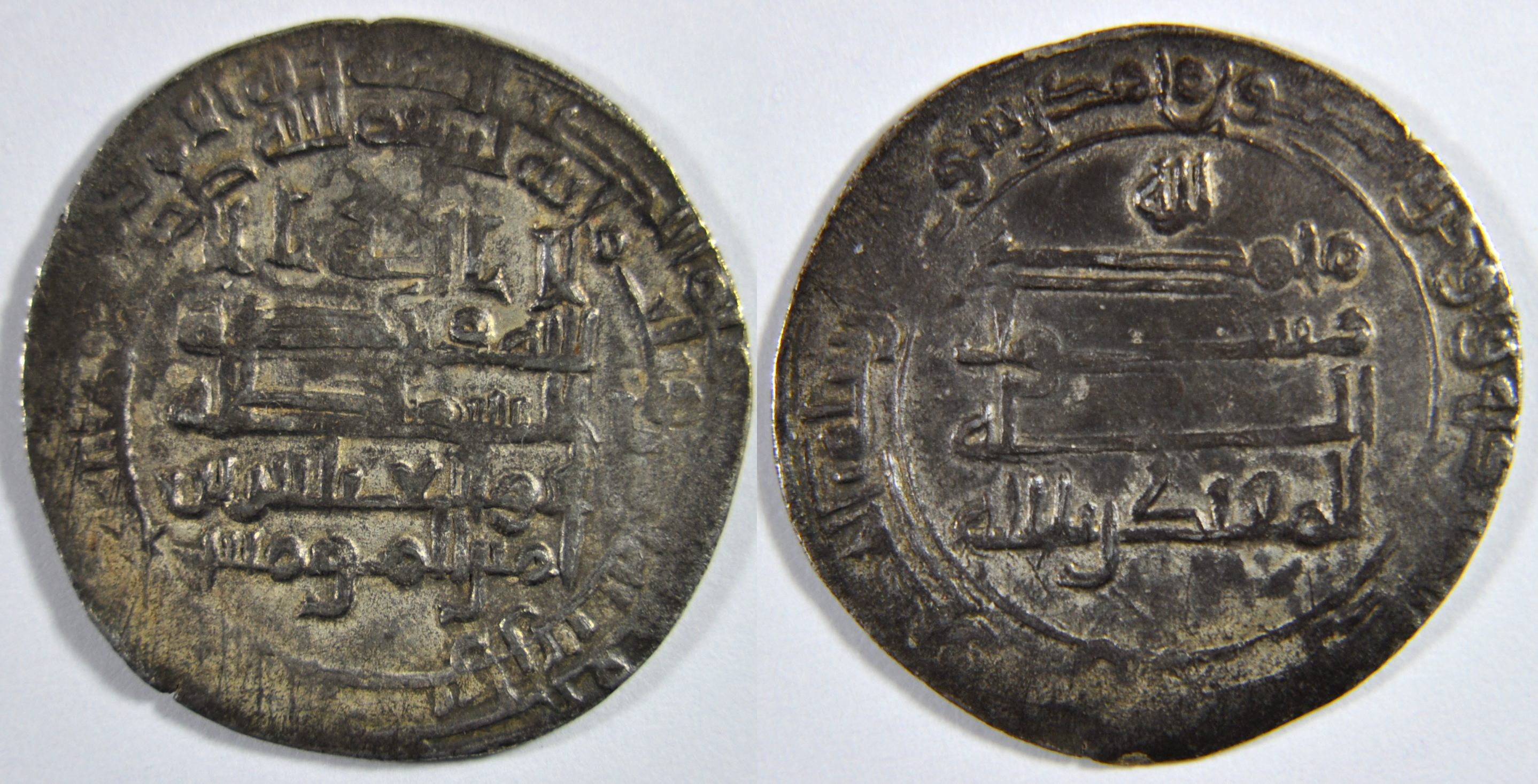
Dirham of al-Muqtadir (r. 908–932)

At court, Mu'nis was an early and staunch opponent of Ibn al-Furat, and an ally of the latter's main rival, Ali ibn Isa al-Jarrah and his faction. The conflict between the two came to a head during Ibn al-Furat's third vizierate, in 923–924. This was a troubled period, which saw Mu'nis sent to quasi-exile in Raqqa, the widespread torture of the Banu'l-Furat's political opponents, as well as the resurgence of the Qarmatian threat with the sack of Basra and the destruction of the Hajj caravan returning from Mecca. All this culminated in a military coup, the deposition of Ibn al-Furat, the recall of Mu'nis, and the subsequent execution of the aged vizier and his son.

This marked the apogee of Mu'nis's career: he was now in virtual control of the government and a decisive voice in the appointment of Ibn al-Furat's successors as viziers. At the same time, however, his power created a widening rift between him and the Caliph, with al-Muqtadir even plotting to assassinate his leading general in 927. In the summer of the same year, Mu'nis led an army to the border around Samosata, which the Byzantines had sacked. The Byzantines managed to catch the Abbasid army by surprise and inflicted a defeat upon them, killing 400 men. In the same year Mu'nis, with Hamdanid help, successfully defended Baghdad itself against a determined Qarmatian invasion. The Qarmatian raids were particularly troublesome: not only did they devastate the fertile districts of the Sawad—the government's chief source of revenue—but also diminished the prestige of the Caliph and the dynasty, especially after the Qarmatians sacked Mecca in 930 and carried off the Black Stone, precipitating the power struggle in Baghdad between Mu'nis and the court faction.

=== Unsuccessful coup against him ===
In 928, following the dismissal of his favourite, Ali ibn Isa, from the vizierate, Mu'nis launched a coup and deposed al-Muqtadir and installed his half-brother al-Qahir in his place, but reneged after a few days. Mu'nis now possessed virtually dictatorial authority over the Abbasid government.

== Early defence policy ==
=== Fatimid invasion of the Cyrenaica (914) ===
The expedition against Egypt was launched on 24 January 914, when the army under Habasa ibn Yusuf departed Tripoli. The Fatimid army took the coastal route. The Abbasid garrisons of Sirte and Ajdabiya abandoned these towns without battle, and on 6 February Habasa entered Barqa, the capital of Cyrenaica and the "gateway of Egypt". The conquest of Cyrenaica promised to be beneficial to the Fatimid treasury: the land tax (kharaj) had brought in 24,000 gold dinars to the Abbasids annually, with another 15,000 dinars provided by the jizya paid by the Christian dhimmi, as well as the zakat, and the ushr taxes. The fatimid troops committed atrocities against the inhabitants and extorted funds from the local merchants. Thus Habasa forced the local pigeon merchants to roast and eat their ware, suspecting them of using their birds to spy for the Abbasids. He urged the members of the local Arab militia (the jund) to enroll in the Fatimid army, while imposing considerable financial levies on the town's population. He furthermore executed two chieftains of the Mazata, who nine years before had waylaid and robbed al-Mahdi during his journey to Ifriqiya; their sons were also killed, while their womenfolk were sold into slavery and their possessions confiscated.

News of the Fatimids' arrival in Barqa provoked the Abbasid authorities in Egypt to send an army against them. Habasa's men, reinforced by fresh troops from Ifriqiya, won the ensuing battle outside the city on 14 March.

=== Fatimid failed invasion of Alexandria ===
Encouraged by this success, Abdallah al-Mahdi billah sent his son and heir, al-Qa'im, with another army east to assume command of the expedition. At the head of a force comprising numerous Kutama as well as members of the Arab jund of Ifriqiya, al-Qa'im set out from al-Mahdi's residence at Raqqada on 11 July. He arrived at Tripoli on 1 August, writing to Habasa to await his coming before invading Egypt proper. Disregarding these orders, however, the ambitious Habasa led his forces into Egypt; after defeating an Abbasid force at al-Hanniya (near modern El Alamein), on 27 August 914 he entered Alexandria. The Kutama raided south along the River Nile and devastated the country, reaching as far as Giza, across the river from the capital of Egypt, Fustat. Habasa wrote to the local governor, Takin al-Khazari, offering safe-conduct (aman) in exchange for his surrender, but Takin refused. Al-Qa'im arrived in Alexandria on 6 November 914, where he imposed the Fatimid call to prayer, a Kutama governor, and an Isma'ili qadi (judge).

In the meantime, the arrival of the Fatimid army in Alexandria provoked panic in Baghdad. The Abbasid government had paid little attention to the affairs of Ifriqiya and the claims of al-Mahdi, but now urgent enquiries were made as to his origin and intentions. Takin urgently requested reinforcements, and the Syrian provinces were mobilized. In September 914, the first Syrian troops began arriving in Fustat. In October, the caliph al-Muqtadir appointed his chamberlain Mu'nis as commander-in-chief and ordered him to Egypt. To support the expedition, and alleviate the financial burden on the Egyptian populace of the expeditionary force, two million silver dirham were allocated by the treasury.

=== Fatimid attempts to March on Fustat and first battle at Giza ===
In early December, as the Nile floods withdrew and allowed the passage of armies along the river, the Fatimid army set out for Fustat in two columns: Habasa ahead, with al-Qa'im following behind. As Fustat lay on the eastern bank of the Nile, and the only way to cross to it was by the pontoon bridge to Rawda Island and Giza, Takin al-Khazari mobilized the garrison and the inhabitants of the city and set up a fortified camp at Giza.

On 13 December, the first alarm was raised in Fustat, with anyone able to bear arms rushing over the bridge, but no attack ensued. This was repeated the next day, and only on the day after did the Fatimids attack. In the ensuing battle, the Abbasid forces prevailed, as Takin's Turkish horse-archers inflicted heavy casualties on the Kutama lancers. The Egyptian forces pursued the Kutama into the night, but during the pursuit the inexperienced levies fell into an ambush, saving the Fatimid army from a complete rout. The Egyptians remained tense, with another false alarm the next day, but only minor skirmishes occurred during the next few days. Despite this setback, some of the Egyptians (Christian Copts and Muslims alike) corresponded with al-Qa'im, revealing the continued presence of an element of possible sympathizers and, according to Heinz Halm, possibly the presence of a Fatimid da'i in Fustat.

=== Fatimid occupation of Fayyum and defeat at Giza ===
Unable to cross the river to Fustat, al-Qa'im moved, with a large part of his army, around Takin's defences and into the fertile Fayyum Oasis, where they could find provisions. The Kutama initially plundered the area, but al-Qa'im restored order and imposed a regular tax regime on the inhabitants.

At this point, al-Qa'im and Habasa, who had remained behind in command of the bulk of the Fatimid army at Giza, fell out when al-Qa'im ordered Habasa replaced. On 8 January 915, in a large-scale battle at Giza, the Fatimids were decisively defeated; Fatimid sources unanimously attribute this defeat to Habasa, who fled the battlefield, despite al-Qa'im's exhortations to stand firm. The pro-Fatimid accounts maintain that al-Qa'im launched three attacks on the enemy and caused many casualties, but these embellishments cannot hide the fact that the battle was a disaster: with his army collapsing, al-Qa'im retreated to Alexandria, which he entered on 23 January.

=== Fatimid withdrawal from Alexandria and revolt in Cyrenaica ===
Despite the setback, in his letters to his father, and the surviving sermons that he delivered in Alexandria, al-Qa'im appears not to have lost confidence in his ultimate success. At Alexandria, he held a number of Friday prayer sermons (khutbah), propagating the Isma'ili and Fatimid cause. For a while he also engaged in negotiations with some Egyptian defectors, who asked for aman from al-Qa'im, and raised the prospect of the capitulation of Fustat. It appears that al-Qa'im himself was not entirely convinced of the sincerity of such proposals, which became impossible when the Abbasid commander-in-chief Mu'nis arrived at Fustat in April 915. Mu'nis dismissed Takin and replaced him with Dhuka al-Rumi.

Soon after, Habasa with thirty of his closest followers deserted al-Qa'im and made for Ifriqiya; alarmed by this, al-Qa'im evacuated Alexandria hastily and without battle, leaving much of his armament and equipment behind. Dhuka occupied the city and installed a strong garrison under his son al-Muzzafar, before returning to Fustat to mete out punishment to those elements suspected of corresponding with al-Qa'im. Al-Qa'im arrived at Raqqada on 28 May 915. In his rear, Cyrenaica rose in revolt and overthrew Fatimid control; in Barqa, the entire Kutama garrison was killed. The rebellion was only suppressed in 917, after an 18-month siege of Barqa.

== Defence of Egypt ==
=== Fatimid invasion attempt of Alexandria and Abbasid fortification of Giza ===
The vanguard arrived before Alexandria on 9 July 919, while the main body under al-Qa'im, came in September/October. The arrival of the Fatimid expeditionary force in July 919 caught the city's governor, Dhuka's son Muzaffar, by surprise. Along with his aides and many of the populace, he fled without giving battle. Having already once acknowledged Fatimid sovereignty and hence now considered in revolt, the city was sacked by the Fatimid troops.

The situation for Dhuka al-Rumi was critical: unlike the previous Fatimid invasion, when the population had largely stood behind the efforts to defend Fustat and armed itself for battle, now panic spread, and those who had the means fled the country into the Levant. At the same time, the garrison proved unwilling to fight for lack of pay; indeed, many officers absconded with their units to Palestine.

As in 914, Abbasid governor Dhuka al-Rumi concentrated his few forces at Giza, across the Nile from Fustat, where the pontoon bridge gave access to Rawda Island and the city itself. There he fortified the bridgehead, erecting a fort and a fortified encampment for his troops. Soon after, however, the new fiscal administrator for Egypt, al-Husayn al-Madhara'i, arrived with sufficient funds to pay the regular troops their arrears. On 11 August, Dhuka died, and his predecessor Takin al-Khazari was chosen to succeed him; he did not arrive in Fustat until January 920, whereupon he ordered a second ditch dug around the camp at Giza.

=== Abbasid reaction and the naval victory of Thamal ===
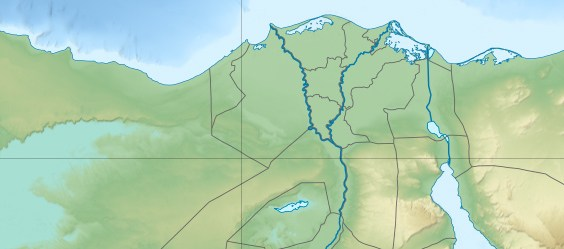
Sites of the campaign in Lower Egypt

Unlike in 914, however, al-Qa'im made no move to exploit the weakness of the Fustat garrison and storm Giza, even though several key figures, including the former Tulunid vizier, Abu Bakr Muhammad ibn Ali al-Madhara'i, corresponded with him. Instead, he remained at Alexandria for the remainder of the year, as reinforcements continued to arrive. These included the Fatimid fleet, 80 ships strong under the eunuch Sulayman.

The Abbasid court also mobilized its forces at the news of the Fatimid invasion; once again, Mu'nis al-Muzaffar was entrusted with the high command, leaving Baghdad on 23 February 920.

More importantly, the fleet of Tarsus, under Thamal al-Dulafi, was given orders to sail to Egypt. Thamal, with his 25 ships carrying Greek fire, arrived in time to prevent the Fatimid ships from entering the Rosetta branch of the Nile, and on 12 March, near Abukir, he inflicted a crushing defeat on the Fatimid fleet, whose vessels were driven to the shore by the wind. Most of the Fatimid crews were either killed or captured. The prisoners were brought to al-Maqs on the Nile, where Takin released most of the ordinary sailors, while admiral Sulayman and 117 of his officers paraded around publicly in Fustat. The Kutama and the black African guardsmen ('Zawila'), some 700 men in total, were delivered to the mob to be lynched.

On 25 May, Mu'nis arrived in Fustat, and with his 3,000 men took position at Giza. Further detachments were sent north, up to Damanhur in the northwestern Nile Delta, which was held by Muhammad ibn Tughj, as well as south, to prevent a possible advance of the Fatimids into Upper Egypt.

=== Fatimid temporarily capture of Fayyum and Upper Egypt and stand-off with Mu'nis ===
Indeed, al-Qa'im, pressed for supplies in Alexandria, decided to repeat the manoeuvre of 914: on 30 July he left Alexandria and, bypassing Giza, took over the fertile Fayyum Oasis, which could provide provisions and a base of operations. As before, he proceeded to tax the inhabitants, as if he were the rightful ruler of Egypt.

In Alexandria he left behind Fath ibn Ta'laba, with orders to construct numerous catapults (manjaniq and 'arrada) to protect the city harbour from a naval attack by Thamal's fleet. Mu'nis did not oppose this move, since his forces were inadequate to confront the Fatimids in open battle, and he was facing difficulties in providing the salary of his troops. Furthermore, when the commander he had sent to Upper Egypt died in spring 921, the Kutama were easily able to take over the entire region, up to the Coptic bishopric of al-Ushmuniyya. Not only did this increase the area under taxation for al-Qa'im, but it also ended the grain supply of Fustat from there.

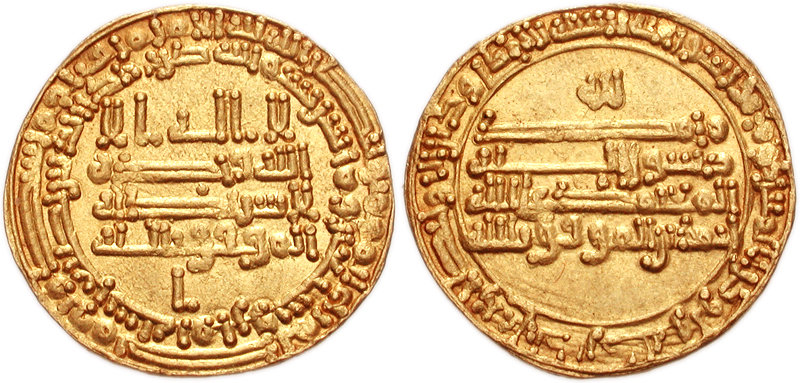
Gold dinar of al-Muqtadir, 298 AH

For an entire year, both sides avoided open conflict, and engaged rather in a diplomatic and propaganda battle. Mu'nis offered promises of safe-conduct (aman), as well as recognition of the Fatimids as autonomous rulers of Ifriqiya in the style of the Aghlabids, if al-Qa'im submitted to the Abbasid caliph. Al-Qa'im rejected these overtures in a letter that reiterated the Fatimids' claims to universal dominion as the rightful heirs of Muhammad. A fragment of a long poem exhorting the inhabitants of Fustat to emulate the "westerners" and follow the rightful Fatimid da'wa also survives; Mu'nis sent a copy to Baghdad, where the scholar al-Suli was commissioned to compose a reply. His riposte to the Fatimids' pretensions was considered so successful that al-Muqtadir gave him 10,000 dinars in reward.

Al-Qa'im also kept up his correspondence with the former vizier al-Madhara'i, who informed him about the Fustat garrison's weakness, but may have played a double game, trying to delay an attack until fresh Abbasid troops arrived. At the same time, the Fatimid commander sent appeals to the two holy cities of Islam, Mecca and Medina, urging them to recognize the Fatimids' claims to sovereignty over the Islamic world. His requests were ignored.

=== Abbasid recovery of Alexandria and Fayyum, retreat of Fatimids ===
Finally, in late spring 921, while Mu'nis sent one of his officers to attack towards Fayyum, Thamal with his fleet sailed down the Nile to Alexandria. The city was captured with relative ease from its Kutama garrison (May/June 921), who left much of their stores and equipment behind. Thamal evacuated the city's inhabitants to Rosetta, and then followed with his fleet.

On 28 June, Mu'nis and Takin, along with Thamal's fleet, set out with all their forces to attack Fayyum. Together, the Abbasid army and fleet blockaded the sole connection of Fayym with the Nile at Illahun, cutting al-Qa'im and his men in the oasis from the rest of the country. Once the Abbasid forces began to advance into the oasis, on 8 July al-Qa'im ordered the retreat: all heavy equipment was left behind, while he and his men made their way through the desert to the coastal road to Barqa, an arduous march in which many perished.

== Family ==
Al-Muqtadir's only wife was Hurra. She was the daughter of Commander-in-Chief, Badr al-Mut'adidi. He was generous towards her. After his death, she remarried a man of lower status. Al-Muqtadir had numerous concubines. One of his concubines was Zalum. She was a Greek, and the mother of al-Muqtadir's eldest son, the future caliph al-Radi and Prince Harun. Another concubine was Dimna. She was the mother of Prince Ishaq, and the grandmother of the future caliph al-Qadir. Another concubine was Khalub also known as Zuhra. She was a Greek, and was the mother of the future caliph al-Muttaqi. Another concubine was Mash'ala. She was a Slavic, and the mother of the future caliph al-Muti'. Another concubine was Khamrah. She was the mother of Prince Isa, and is described as having been very charitable to the poor and the needy. She died on 3 July 988, and was buried in Rusafah Cemetery. Another concubine was the mother of Prince Ibrahim. Another concubine was the mother of a son, born in 909. She was buried in Rusafah Cemetery. Al-Muqtadir had two daughters. One died in 911, and was buried beside the grave of her grandfather caliph al-Mu'tadid in the Dar of Muhammad bin Abdullah bin Tahir. The second died in 917, and was buried in Rusafah Cemetery.

Children

The children of al-Muqtadir are:

- al-Radi was born on 20 December 909, to the caliph al-Muqtadir (r. 908–932) and a Greek slave concubine named Zalum. He was nominated Heir by his father.
- al-Muttaqi, also known as Abu Ishaq Ibrahim.
- al-Muti', was born in 913/14 as al-Fadl, a son of Caliph al-Muqtadir and a Slavic concubine, Mash'ala.
- Harun ibn al-Muqtadir, was the younger son of al-Muqtadir and Zalum.
- Ishaq ibn al-Muqtadir, he was one of the younger son of al-Muqtadir. He died in March 988.
- Isa ibn al-Muqtadir
- Ibrahim ibn al-Muqtadir, youngest son of al-Muqtadir.

== Death and legacy ==
=== Assassination and succession ===
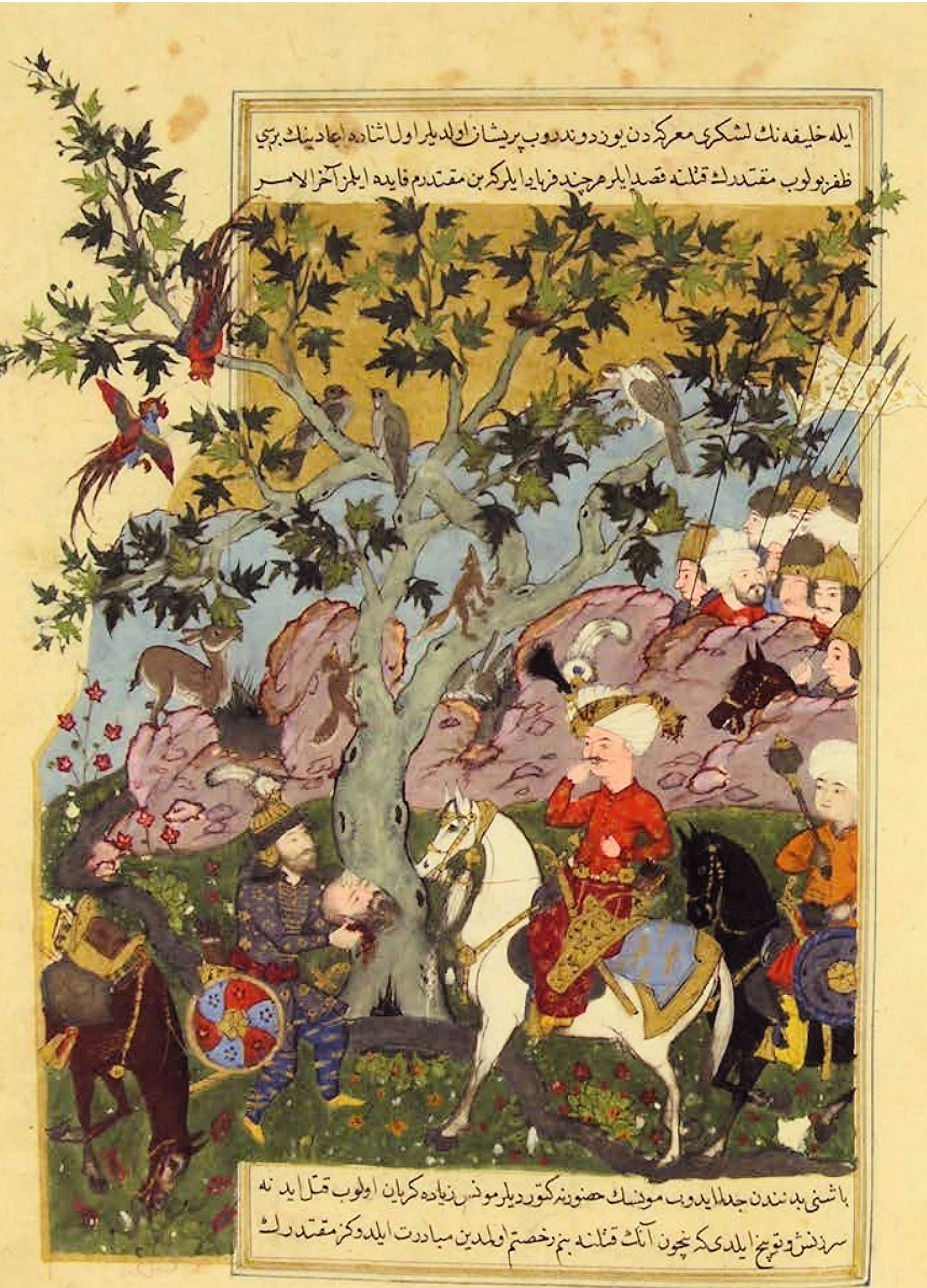
The head of al-Muqtadir brought before Mu'nis. Cāmiʿü’s-siyer of Muhammed Tahir, Topkapı Palace Museum Library, Istanbul, H. 1230, fol. 70a.

In 931, al-Muqtadir rallied enough support to force him to leave Baghdad, but in 932, after gathering troops, Mu'nis marched onto Baghdad and defeated the caliphal army before the city walls, with al-Muqtadir falling in the field. Triumphant, Mu'nis now installed al-Qahir as caliph, but the two quickly became estranged. The new caliph resumed contacts with the defeated court faction, and found himself soon under confinement in his palace. Nevertheless, in August 933 al-Qahir managed to lure Mu'nis and his main lieutenants to the palace, where they were executed.

=== Assessment and legacy ===
Al-Muqtadir was the last Abbasid Caliph of his era to enjoy full authority of Caliph among Muslims without any rival Caliphates. Under al-Muqtadir's Caliphate, Shia rebels in Ifriqiya established rival Caliphate and several decades later this Small Caliphate turned into a large Empire. On 26 August 909, the Kutama army reached Sijilmasa, and demanded the release of their captive shia imam. After brief clashes with the Midrarid troops, Emir al-Yasa fled his city, which was occupied and plundered. Mounted on horseback and dressed in fine clothes, Sa'id and his son were presented to the army, amidst shouts and tears of religious exaltation. On the next day, 27 August, Sa'id was enthroned and acclaimed by the troops. As the historian Michael Brett explains, the occasion had double meaning: on the one hand, it acknowledged Sa'id's leadership, but on the other, it recognised the Kutama soldiery as 'faithful' (mu'minin) or 'friends of God' (awliya), an elite distinct from the mass of ordinary Muslims.

The new usurper Fatimid rulers in Ifriqiya, were rejected by the Sunni Maliki elites. Maliki authors call them merely "Easterners" or even "Unbelievers", and the caliphs by their first names rather than their regnal titles. Abdallah himself was derisively called by the diminutive form of his first name as Ubayd Allah ('Little Abd Allah'); whence the dynasty is usually labelled in hostile sources as "Ubaydid" (Banī ʿUbayd).

Two decades later Abd al-Rahman III declare himself Caliph of Córdoba on 16 January 929, effectively breaking his allegiance to, and ties with the Abbasid caliphs. The caliphate was thought only to belong to the Emperor who ruled over the sacred cities of Mecca and Medina, like al-Muqtadir. These two rival Caliphates pose a threat to the Abbasids in the late tenth century and eleventh century.

== See also ==
- Ahmad ibn Fadlan, Arab Muslim traveler who wrote an account of al-Muqtadir's embassy to the king of the Volga Bulgars.

== Sources ==
- Bonner, Michael (2010). "The waning of empire, 861–945". In Robinson, Chase F. (ed.). The New Cambridge History of Islam, Volume 1: The Formation of the Islamic World, Sixth to Eleventh Centuries. Cambridge: Cambridge University Press. pp. 305–359. ISBN 978-0-521-83823-8.
- Bowen, Harold (1928). The Life and Times of ʿAlí Ibn ʿÍsà, ‘The Good Vizier’. Cambridge: Cambridge University Press.
- Brubaker, L.; Tougher, S. (2016). Approaches to the Byzantine Family. Birmingham Byzantine and Ottoman Studies. Taylor & Francis. ISBN 978-1-317-18001-2.
- El Cheikh, Nadia Maria (2013). "The Harem". Crisis and Continuity at the Abbasid Court: Formal and Informal Politics in the Caliphate of al-Muqtadir (295–320/908–32). Leiden: Brill. pp. 165–185. ISBN 978-90-04-25271-4.
- Kennedy, Hugh (2001). The Armies of the Caliphs: Military and Society in the Early Islamic State. London and New York: Routledge. ISBN 978-0-415-25093-1.
- Kennedy, Hugh (2004) [1986]. The Prophet and the Age of the Caliphates: The Islamic Near East from the 6th to the 11th Century (Second ed.). Harlow: Longman. ISBN 978-0-582-40525-7.
- Güner, Ahmet (2006). "Mutî'-Lillâh". TDV Encyclopedia of Islam, Vol. 31 (Muhammedi̇yye – Münâzara) (in Turkish). Istanbul: Presidency of Religious Affairs, Centre for Islamic Studies. pp. 401–402. ISBN 978-975-389-458-6.
- Kennedy, Hugh (2006). When Baghdad Ruled the Muslim World: The Rise and Fall of Islam's Greatest Dynasty. Cambridge, MA: Da Capo Press. ISBN 978-0-306814808.
- Kennedy, Hugh (2013). "The Reign of al-Muqtadir (295–320/908–32): A History". Crisis and Continuity at the Abbasid Court: Formal and Informal Politics in the Caliphate of al-Muqtadir (295–320/908–32). Leiden: Brill. pp. 13–47. ISBN 978-90-04-25271-4.
- Lilie, Ralph-Johannes; Ludwig, Claudia; Pratsch, Thomas; Zielke, Beate (2013). Prosopographie der mittelbyzantinischen Zeit Online. Berlin-Brandenburgische Akademie der Wissenschaften. Nach Vorarbeiten F. Winkelmanns erstellt (in German). Berlin and Boston: De Gruyter.
- Massignon, Louis (1994). The Passion of Al-Hallaj: Mystic and Martyr of Islam. Translated by Herbert Mason. Princeton University Press. ISBN 978-0-691019192.
- Mottahedeh, Roy (1975). "The ʿAbbāsid Caliphate in Iran". In Frye, R. N. (ed.). The Cambridge History of Iran, Volume 4: From the Arab Invasion to the Saljuqs. Cambridge: Cambridge University Press. pp. 57–89.
- Osti, Letizia (2013). "The Caliph". Crisis and Continuity at the Abbasid Court: Formal and Informal Politics in the Caliphate of al-Muqtadir (295–320/908–32). Leiden: Brill. pp. 49–61. ISBN 978-90-04-25271-4.
- Özaydın, Abdülkerim (2007). "Râzî-Billâh". TDV Encyclopedia of Islam, Vol. 34 (Osmanpazari – Resuldar) (in Turkish). Istanbul: Presidency of Religious Affairs, Centre for Islamic Studies. pp. 489–490. ISBN 978-975-389-456-2.
- Rosenthal, Franz, ed. (1985). The History of al-Ṭabarī, Volume XXXVIII: The Return of the Caliphate to Baghdad: The Caliphates of al-Muʿtaḍid, al-Muktafī and al-Muqtadir, A.D. 892–915/A.H. 279–302. SUNY Series in Near Eastern Studies. Albany, New York: State University of New York Press. ISBN 978-0-87395-876-9.
- Sourdel, D. (1978). "al-Ḳādir Bi'llāh". In van Donzel, E.; Lewis, B.; Pellat, Ch. & Bosworth, C. E. (eds.). The Encyclopaedia of Islam, Second Edition. Volume IV: Iran–Kha. Leiden: E. J. Brill. pp. 378–379. doi:10.1163/1573-3912_islam_SIM_3761. ISBN 978-90-04-05745-6. OCLC 758278456.
- Zetterstéen, K. V. & Bosworth, C. E. (1993a). "al-Muḳtadir". In Bosworth, C. E.; van Donzel, E.; Heinrichs, W. P. & Pellat, Ch. (eds.). The Encyclopaedia of Islam, Second Edition. Volume VII: Mif–Naz. Leiden: E. J. Brill. pp. 541–542. ISBN 978-90-04-09419-2.
- Zetterstéen, K. V. & Bosworth, C. E. (1993b). "al-Muṭīʿ Li 'llāh". In Bosworth, C. E.; van Donzel, E.; Heinrichs, W. P. & Pellat, Ch. (eds.). The Encyclopaedia of Islam, Second Edition. Volume VII: Mif–Naz. Leiden: E. J. Brill. p. 799. doi:10.1163/1573-3912_islam_SIM_5674. ISBN 978-90-04-09419-2.
- Bowen, H. (1993). "Muʾnis al-Muẓaffar". In Bosworth, C. E.; van Donzel, E.; Heinrichs, W. P. & Pellat, Ch. (eds.). The Encyclopaedia of Islam, Second Edition. Volume VII: Mif–Naz. Leiden: E. J. Brill. p. 575. ISBN 978-90-04-09419-2.
- Zetterstéen, K. V. (1995). "al-Rāḍī bi'llāh". In Bosworth, C. E.; van Donzel, E.; Heinrichs, W. P. & Lecomte, G. (eds.). The Encyclopaedia of Islam, Second Edition. Volume VIII: Ned–Sam. Leiden: E. J. Brill. p. 368. ISBN 978-90-04-09834-3.
- Hermes, Nizar F. (2012). "Utter Alterity or Pure Humanity: Barbarian Turks, Bulghars, and Rus (Vikings) in the Remarkable Risala of Ibn Fadlan". The (European) Other in Medieval Arabic Literature and Culture: Ninth-Twelfth Century AD. The New Middle Ages. New York: Palgrave.
- Knight, Judson (2001). "Ibn Fadlan: An Arab Among the Vikings of Russia". In Schlager, Neil; Lauer, Josh (eds.). Science and Its Times. Vol. 700 to 1449. Detroit: Gale.
- Brett, Michael (2001). The Rise of the Fatimids: The World of the Mediterranean and the Middle East in the Fourth Century of the Hijra, Tenth Century CE. The Medieval Mediterranean. Vol. 30. Leiden: Brill. ISBN 90-04-11741-5.
- Halm, Heinz (1991). Das Reich des Mahdi: Der Aufstieg der Fatimiden [The Empire of the Mahdi: The Rise of the Fatimids] (in German). Munich: C. H. Beck. ISBN 978-3-406-35497-7.
- Lev, Yaacov (1979). "The Fāṭimid Conquest of Egypt – Military Political and Social Aspects". Israel Oriental Studies. 9: 315–328. ISSN 0334-4401.
- Lev, Yaacov (1988). "The Fāṭimids and Egypt 301–358/914–969". Arabica. 35 (2): 186–196. doi:10.1163/157005888X00332.
- Brett, Michael (2017). The Fatimid Empire. The Edinburgh History of the Islamic Empires. Edinburgh: Edinburgh University Press. ISBN 978-0-7486-4076-8.
- Dachraoui, F. (1986). "al-Mahdī ʿUbayd Allāh". In Bosworth, C. E.; van Donzel, E.; Lewis, B. & Pellat, Ch. (eds.). The Encyclopaedia of Islam, Second Edition. Volume V: Khe–Mahi. Leiden: E. J. Brill. pp. 1242–1244. ISBN 978-90-04-07819-2.
- Daftary, Farhad (2007). The Ismāʿı̄lı̄s: Their History and Doctrines (Second ed.). Cambridge: Cambridge University Press. ISBN 978-0-521-61636-2.
- Canard, Marius (1965). "Fāṭimids". In Lewis, B.; Pellat, Ch. & Schacht, J. (eds.). The Encyclopaedia of Islam, Second Edition. Volume II: C–G. Leiden: E. J. Brill. pp. 850–862. OCLC 495469475.
- Halm, Heinz (2014). "Fāṭimids". In Fleet, Kate; Krämer, Gudrun; Matringe, Denis; Nawas, John; Rowson, Everett (eds.). Encyclopaedia of Islam (3rd ed.). Brill Online. ISSN 1873-9830.
- Madelung, Wilferd (1996). "The Fatimids and the Qarmatīs of Bahrayn". In Daftary, Farhad (ed.). Mediaeval Isma'ili History and Thought. Cambridge: Cambridge University Press. pp. 21–73. ISBN 978-0-521-00310-0.

al-Muqtadir Abbasid dynasty Born: 895 Died: 31 October 932
Sunni Islam titles
Preceded by al-Muktafi	Caliph of the Abbasid Caliphate; 13 August 908 – 929; Rival claims to the caliphate by the Fatimid caliph al-Mahdi Billah in 909 and Abd-ar-Rahman III of Córdoba in 929	Succeeded by al-Qahir
Preceded by al-Qahir	Caliph of the Abbasid Caliphate; 929 – 31 October 932	Succeeded by al-Qahir
