= Mazalim =

Abbasid government institution

- Flag of Abbasid dynasty

Abbasid Government Institution overview
- Formed: Late eighth century
- Dissolved: Thirteenth century
- Jurisdiction: Caliphate
- Headquarters: Baghdad; Samarra
- Abbasid Government Institution executive: Abbasid Caliphs

Al-Maẓālim (Arabic: المظالم, romanized: al-maẓālim, lit. 'injustices, grievances') were an ancient pre-Islamic institution that was adopted by the Abbasid Caliphate in the eighth century CE. The main purpose of the maẓālim courts was to give ordinary people redress. Al-Maẓālim, or the sultan's court, was distinguished from the shurṭa or police courts.

== Bibliography ==
- Tyan, Emile. Histoire de l'organisation judiciaire en pays d'Islam. Leiden: Brill, 1960.
- Nielsen, Jorgen. Secular Justice in an Islamic State: Maẓālim under the Baḥrī Mamlūks, 662/1264-789/1387. Leiden: Nederlands Historisch-Archaeologisch Instituut te Istanbul, 1985.
- Tillier, Mathieu. Qādī-s and the political use of the mazālim jurisdiction under the ʿAbbāsids. In Maribel Fierro and Christian Lange (eds.), Public Violence in Islamic Societies: Power, Discipline, and the Construction of the Public Sphere, 7th-18th Centuries CE. Edinburgh: Edinburgh University Press, 2009, p. 42-66. Online: http://hal.archives-ouvertes.fr/docs/00/61/38/82/PDF/Tillier-Mazalim-Epreuves.pdf
- Tillier, Mathieu. The Maẓālim in Historiography. In A.M. Emon and R. Ahmed (eds.), Oxford Handbook of Islamic Law. Oxford: Oxford University Press, 2018, p. 357-380.
- van Berkel, Maaike. Embezzlement and reimbursement. Disciplining officials in ‘Abbāsid Baghdad (8th-10th centuries A.D.). International Journal of Public Administration, 34 (2011), p. 712-719.
