= Muqtadir Nimji =

Kenyan squash player (born 1999)

Personal information
- Full name: Muqtadir Sadruddin Nimji
- Born: September 8, 1999 (age 26) Nairobi, Kenya
- Education: University of Birmingham

Sport
- Country: Kenya
- Handedness: Right-handed
- Retired: Active
- Racquet used: 2021

Men's singles
- Highest ranking: No. 494 (July 2022)
- Current ranking: No. 494 (July 2022)
- Updated on July 2022

Muqtadir Nimji (born 8 September 1999 in Nairobi) is a Kenyan professional squash player. As of July 2022, he was ranked number 494 in the world. He is the Kenyan number 1, and represents Kenya in international competitions.
