= Abbasid harem =

Women's quarter of Abbasid household

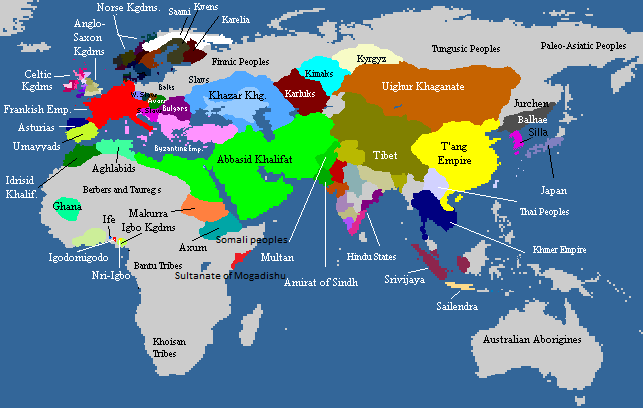
Map of the Abbasid Empire, it vassals and other world empires in the 9th century

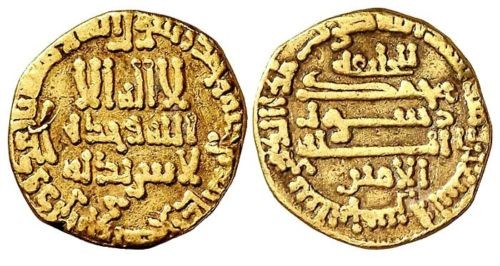
Gold dinar minted during the reign of al-Amin (809–813)

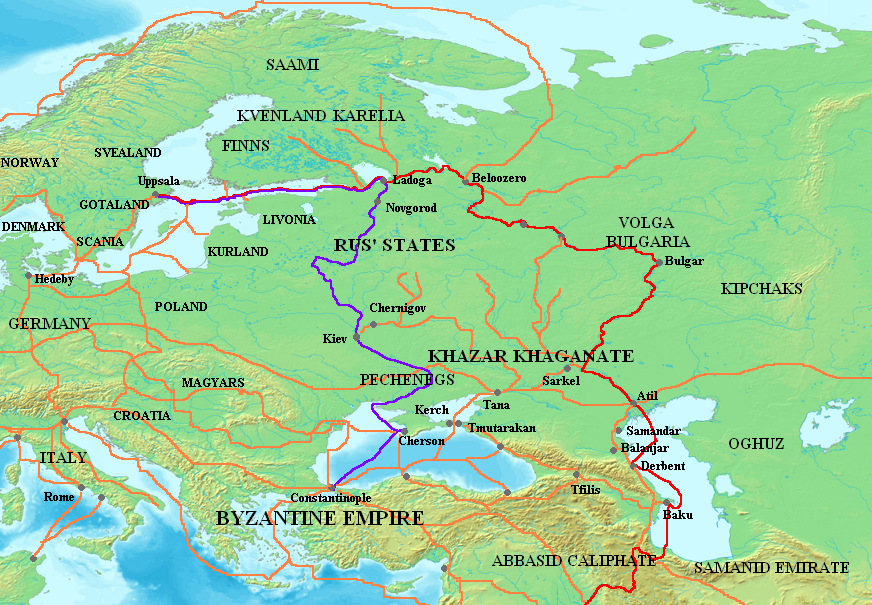
Map showing the major Varangian trade routes: the Volga trade route (in red) and the Trade Route from the Varangians to the Greeks (in purple). Other trade routes of the eighth-eleventh centuries shown in orange.

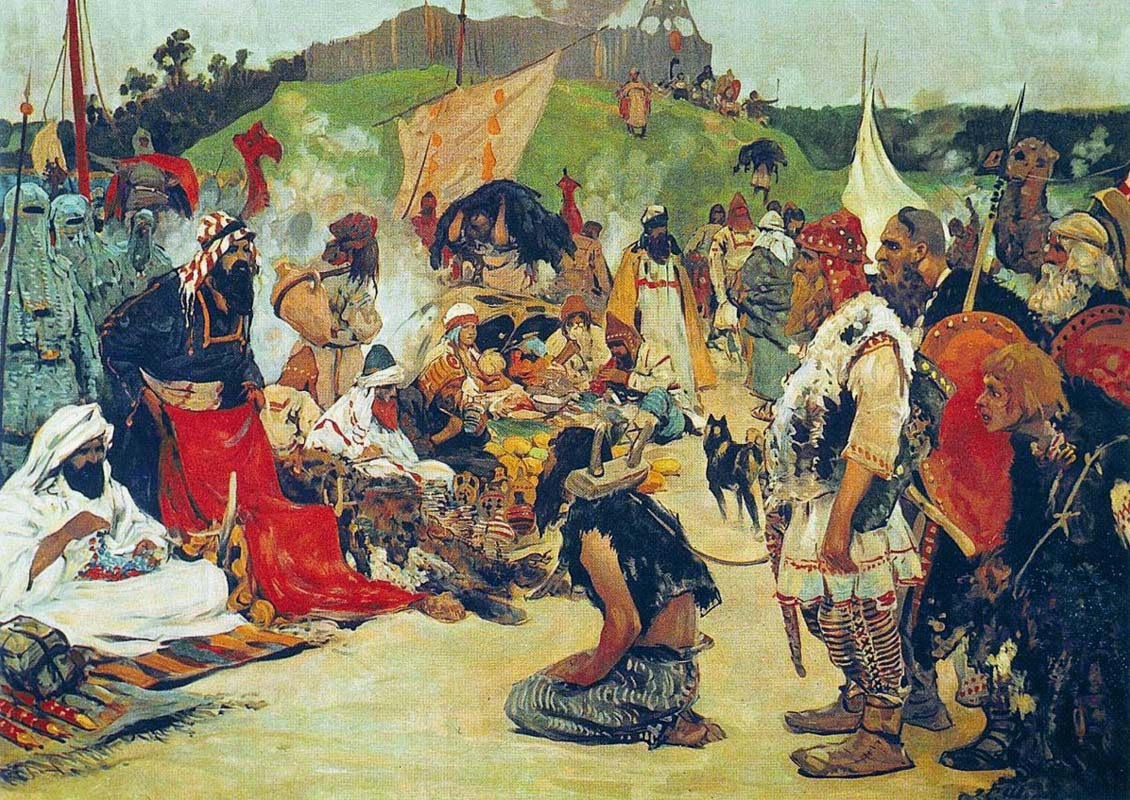
The Rus trading slaves with the Khazars: Trade in the East Slavic Camp by Sergei Ivanov (1913). Many saqaliba slaves came from Europe to the Abbasid harem via the Volga trade route from Eastern Europe via the Khazars and the Caspian Sea

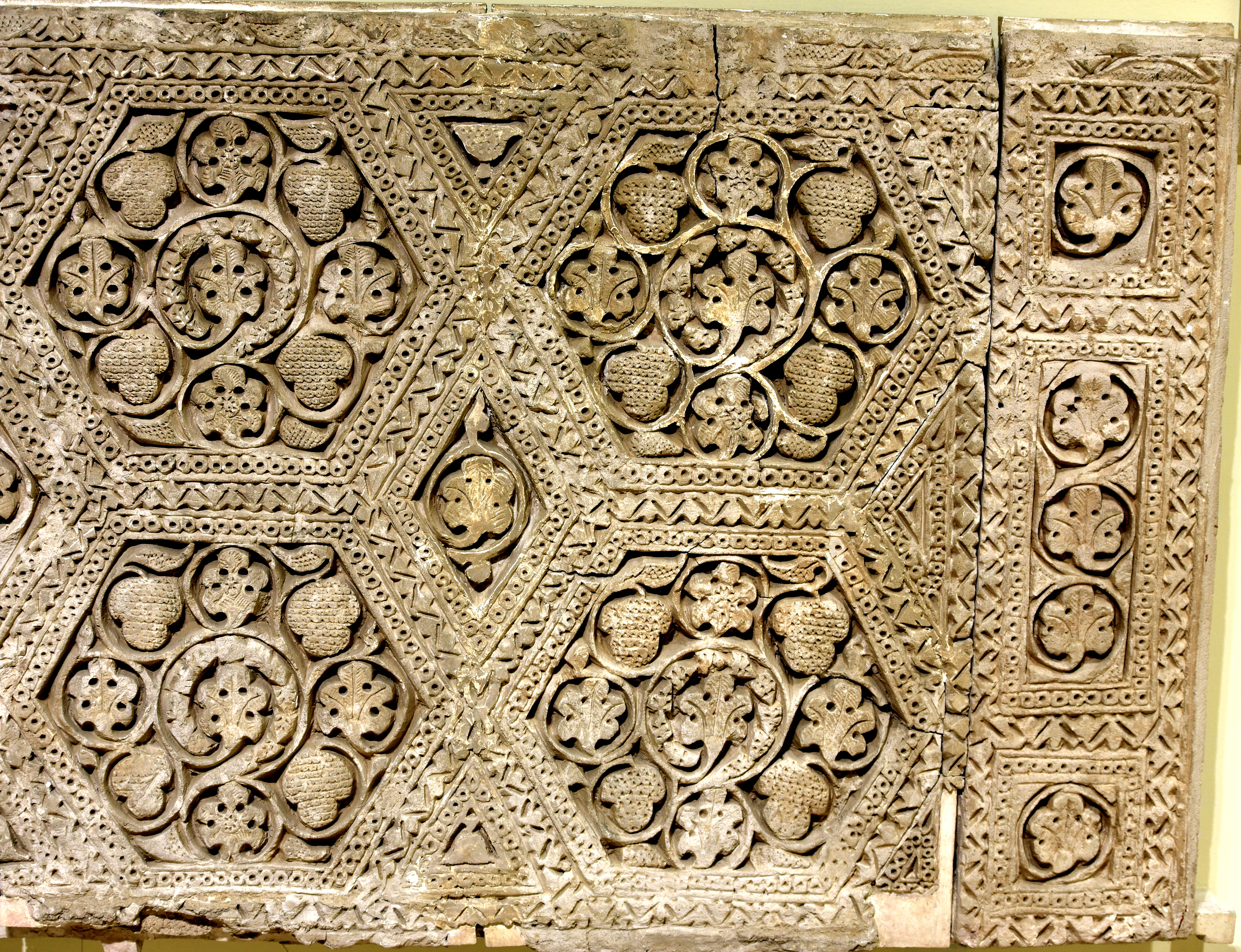
Wall decoration made of gypsum from Iskaf Bani Junaid, Iraq, 3rd century AH. Iraq Museum

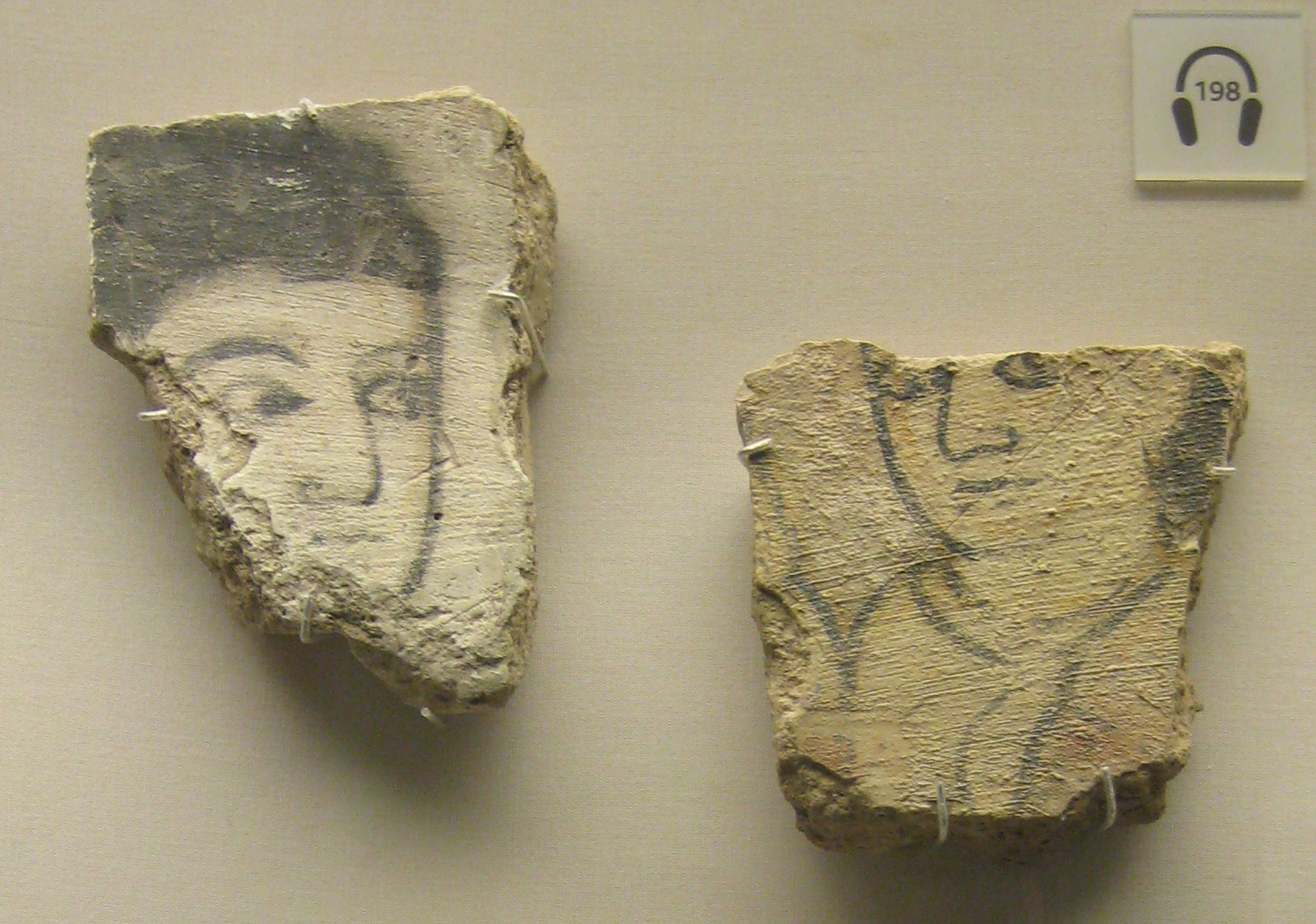
9th-century harem wall painting fragments found in Samarra

The harem of the caliphs of the Abbasid Caliphate (750–1258) in Baghdad was composed of their mothers, wives, slave concubines, female relatives and slave servants (women and eunuchs), occupying a secluded portion of the Abbasid household. This institution played an important social function within the Abbasid court and was that part were the women were confined and secluded. The senior woman in rank in the harem was the mother of the Caliph. The Abbasid harem acted as a role model for the harems of other Islamic dynasties, as it was during the Abbasid Caliphate that the harem system was fully enforced in the Muslim world.

== Background and origin ==
The harem system first became fully institutionalized in the Islamic world under the Abbasid caliphate. Although the term harem does not denote women's quarters in the Quran, a number of Quranic verses discussing modesty and seclusion were held up by Quranic commentators as religious rationale for the separation of women from men, including the so-called hijab verse (33:53). In modern usage hijab colloquially refers to the religious attire worn by Muslim women, but in this verse it meant "veil" or "curtain" that physically separates female from male space. Although classical commentators agreed that the verse spoke about a curtain separating the living quarters of Muhammad's wives from visitors to his house, they usually viewed this practice as providing a model for all Muslim women.

In contrast to the earlier era of the Islamic prophet Muhammad and the Rashidun Caliphate, women in Umayyad and Abbasid society were ideally kept in seclusion and absent from all arenas of the community's central affairs.

The growing seclusion of women were illustrated by the power struggle between the Caliph Al-Hadi and his mother Al-Khayzuran, who refused to live in seclusion but instead challenged the power of the Caliph by giving her own audiences to male supplicants and officials and thus mixing with men. Her son considered this improper, and he publicly addressed the issue of his mothers public life by assembling his generals and asked them:

'Who is the better among us, you or me?' asked Caliph al-Hadi of his audience.
'Obviously you are the better, Commander of the Faithful,' the assembly replied.
'And whose mother is the better, mine or yours?' continued the caliph.
'Your mother is the better, Commander of the Faithful.'
'Who among you', continued al-Hadi, 'would like to have men spreading news about your mother?'
'No one likes to have his mother talked about,' responded those present.
'Then why do men go to my mother to speak to her?'

Conquests had brought enormous wealth and large numbers of slaves to the Muslim elite. The majority of the slaves were women and children, many of whom had been dependents or harem-members of the defeated Sassanian upper classes. In the wake of the conquests an elite man could potentially own a thousand slaves, and ordinary soldiers could have ten people serving them.

Nabia Abbott, preeminent historian of elite women of the Abbasid Caliphate, describes the lives of harem women as follows.

The choicest women were imprisoned behind heavy curtains and locked doors, the strings and keys of which were entrusted into the hands of that pitiable creature – the eunuch. As the size of the harem grew, men indulged to satiety. Satiety within the individual harem meant boredom for the one man and neglect for the many women. Under these conditions ... satisfaction by perverse and unnatural means crept into society, particularly in its upper classes.

The marketing of human beings, particularly women, as objects for sexual use meant that elite men owned the vast majority of women they interacted with, and related to them as would masters to slaves.

== Hierarchy and organisation ==
The Abbasid harem established a model of hierarchy and organisation which was to become a standard for Muslim harems for centuries. It was a large institution; during the reign of al-Muqtadir, the harem consisted of 4000 enslaved women and 11.000 enslaved servants.

=== The mother ===
On the top of the hierarchy was not the wife of the ruler. As a Muslim, the ruler could have several wives, and as he must formally treat them equally, he could not give one wife higher status than another, and give her a role similar to that of a Christian queen consort. Instead, it was the mother of the Caliph who had the highest rank and position in the harem and thereby among all the women at court.

Her background could be both that of a free wife, or that of an enslaved concubine.

=== Female relatives ===
In the harem resided also the unmarried or divorced daughters, sisters and other nonmarried female relatives of the Caliph.

The Abbasid princesses could make themselves known for their poetry and other accomplishments, as long as they observed the seclusion. Princess Ulayya bint al-Mahdi only performed in private, chaperoned family functions to avoid any potential impropriety, such as to be compared to the slave-qiyan, jawaris or mughanniyat, but she was referred to as a qayna as a tribute to her musical ability.

=== Wives ===
The wives of the Abbasid caliphs were known as hurra. The caliph sometimes entered diplomatic marriages. During the later centuries of the Abbasid Caliphate the caliphs often married Seljuk princesses, who acted as pious role models by founding or making donations to pious or charitable institutions. It was common for caliphs to manumit and marry their former slave concubines.

=== Concubines ===
Below the legal wives were the enslaved concubines of the caliph. These included the jariya also known as ama and khadima, who were often acquired through warfare or slave markets. She could be used for sexual relations by him and could also be shared with other men for their pleasure. The jariya was regarded as property and could be bought, inherited, or freed at the discretion of her owner.

Above the jariyas were the mahziyyat or hazaya. These concubines unlike the jariyas could not be shared with other men. The cost for acquiring a mahziyya could soar to hundreds of thousands of dirhams. She often assumed a significant antagonistic role towards the master's wife.

A slave concubine who was selected to have sex with the caliph and then gave birth to a child by him, attained the coveted position of an umm al-walad. This prevented her from being sold, ensuring she remained a slave under her master's control, and she became freed upon her master's death. She could also become a legal wife of the caliph, if he manumitted her and chose to marry her.

=== Female entertainers ===
The harem also consisted of a large number of jawaris; enslaved female entertainers. They performed for the caliph and the rest of the harem.

The Jawari entertainers were not synonymous with the concubines, and the jawaris and concubines belonged to two different categories. However, the Jawaris could be chosen by the Caliph for sexual intercourse, and thus transition to become a concubine.

The jawaris were sometimes former qiyan. One famous harem entertainer was the concubine ʽInān and the singer Shāriyah.

During reign of the Caliph al-Amin (r. 809–813) in Baghdad, there was a category of female entertainers known as ghulamyyat, slave-girls dressed as boys, who were trained to perform as singers and musicians and who attended the drinking parties of the sovereign and his male guests.

=== Qahramana ===
The qahramana (Arabic: قَهْرَمانَة qahramānah, 'stewardess') were female slaves responsible for various tasks within the harem. They could act as governesses for the children, as well as the personal servants and agents of the women, functioning as intermediaries between the harem women and the outside world.

The qahramana were the only women who were allowed the mobility to leave and enter the harem, and they regularly left the harem to make purchases for the secluded harem women and handle the affairs between the women and the merchants and tradespeople of the outside world. This mobility was envied by the harem women, and one story describe the envy of a harem woman, who wished to become a qahramana so that she would be able to leave the harem, and finally managed to achieve her goal to become a qahramana.

The mobility of a qahramana made them into influential figures as the personal agents and messengers between the harem women and the world outside the harem. Umm Musa, qahramana to the mother of al-Muqtadir, became an influential figure as a messenger of supplicants to the Caliph mother and the Caliph. Another example was qahramana Zaydan, who acted as the jailkeeper of high status prisoners: after having been the jailer of the vizier Ibn al-Furat, who had fallen from favour, she managed to have him restored to power through her harem contacts and was rewarded by him with lands and wealth, a cooperation which continued for the rest of their careers. The perhaps most famous of them all were Thumal the Qahraman.

=== Eunuchs ===
The eunuchs were the castrated male slaves responsible for guarding the harem, for preventing the women from leaving the harem and for approving any visitor before they gained entrance.

The custom of using eunuchs as servants for women inside the Islamic harems had a preceding example in the life of Muhammad himself, who used the eunuch Mabur as a servant in the house of his own slave concubine Maria al-Qibtiyya; both of them slaves from Egypt. Eunuchs was for a long time used in relatively small numbers, exclusively inside harems, but the use of eunuchs expanded significantly when eunuchs started being used also for other offices within service and administration outside of the harem, a use which expanded gradually during the Umayyad Caliphate and had its breakthrough during the Abbasid Caliphate. During the Abbasid period, eunuchs became a permanent institution inside the Islamic harems after the model of the Abbasid harem.

== Harem slavery ==
With the exception of the legal wives and female relatives of the Caliph, the inhabitants of the harem—concubines, entertainers and eunuchs—were all enslaved people. The slaves were either war captives (called sabaya) or bought from slave markets, and the slave women were divided in to the categories jawari and qiyan (singers), mahziyyat (concubines) and qahramanat (stewardesses). The men meant for the harem were all eunuchs; the non eunuch males served the palace outside of the harem.

According to Islamic practice of slavery and slave trade, foreign non-Muslims were free to enslave, and it was preferred that slaves were to be non-Muslims from non-Muslim regions. In accordance with the Ma malakat aymanukum, the principle of concubinage, women could be legally kept as concubines in the harem if they were of non-Muslim origin. The four main ways to enslave a person were by kidnapping, by slave raids, by piracy, or by buying a child from poor parents.

One of the chief regions for the export of slaves to the Abbasid Caliphate came through Persia (Iran), which was a passage area for several slave trade routes: the saqaliba slave trade of Europeans provided by the Vikings to the Samanid Empire in Central Asia via the Volga trade route; the slave trade of mainly Turks from Central Asia, also via the Samanid slave trade; Christian Greeks, Armenians, and Georgians from the Caucasus by Muslim slavers; and the slave route of Hindu Indians following the Islamic invasion of India from the 8th-century onward. Since many parts of Persia remained Zoroastrian the first centuries after conquest, some non-Muslim "infidel territory" in Persia were also exposed to Muslim slave raids, particularly Daylam in northwestern Iran and the Pagan mountainous region of Ḡūr in central Afghanistan. Two of the twelve caliphs’ mothers whose nationalities are known were European saqaliba; Al-Musta'in's mother Mukhariq, and Al-Mu'tazz's mother Qabiha. A Zoroastrian-Persian background were not uncommon among the qiyan-entertainers and slave concubines in the Caliphate, and some ended up in the Abbasid harem itself; Marājel, concubine of Harun al-Rashid and mother of the future caliph Al-Ma'mun, and Māridah, slave of Harun al-Rashid and mother of the future caliph Al-Mu'tasim, were both Iranians.

== Dissolution ==
When the Mongols of the Ilkhanate conquered Baghdad in 1258, they took an inventory of the possessions of Caliph al-Musta'sim. This included the inhabitants of his harem. The inventory proved that the Abbasid harem at that point contained 1000 eunuchs and 700 women, whom the Caliph claimed had never seen sun nor moon. The Caliph asked to keep the women, and was allowed to select 100 to keep.

"An order was given for the Caliph's harem to be counted. There were seven hundred women and concubines and a thousand servants. When the Caliph was apprised of the count of the harem, he begged and pleaded, saying, "Let me have the women of the harem, upon whom neither sun nor the moon has ever shone."

The Caliph was however killed shortly after, and the members of his household and his family where killed or taken captive as slaves. The Persian historian Wassaf wrote:

“They swept through the city like hungry falcons attacking a flight of doves, or like raging wolves attacking sheep, with loose reins and shameless faces, murdering and spreading terror...beds and cushions made of gold and encrusted with jewels were cut to pieces with knives and torn to shreds. Those hiding behind the veils of the great Harem were dragged...through the streets and alleys, each of them becoming a plaything...as the population died at the hands of the invaders.”

== Legacy ==
=== Impact ===
The Abbasid harem system came to be a role model for the harems of later Islamic rulers, and the same model can be found in subsequent Islamic nations during the Middle Ages, such as the harem of the Caliphate of Cordoba and the Fatimid harem of the Fatimid Caliphate, which also consisted of the model of prominent mothers; slave concubines who became umm walad when giving birth; female Jawaris entertainers, qahramana's and eunuchs. The harem system was similar during the Ottoman Empire, with only minor changes in the model of the Imperial Harem.

=== Fiction ===
- Assassin's Creed Mirage features the Abbasid harem, a concubine and a stewardess.

== See also ==
- Harem#Umayyad and Abbasid Caliphates
- Imperial Harem
- History of concubinage in the Muslim world
- Qiyan
- Safavid imperial harem
- Qajar harem

== Sources ==
- Ahmed, Leila (1992). Women and Gender in Islam: Historical Roots of a Modern Debate. Yale University Press. ISBN 978-0-300-05583-2.
