= Kufrani family =

The Kufrani family was an Iranian family in Isfahan, notable for their activity during the Safavid era. The family continued to study at the Molla Abdollah School until 1902/03.

== Sources ==
- Quiring-Zoche, Rosemarie (1980). Isfahan im 15. und 16. Jahrhundert: Ein Beitrag zur persischen Stadtgeschichte. Islamkundliche Untersuchungen (in German). Berlin: Klaus Schwarz Verlag.
