= Ibn Abi Awn =

Ibrāhīm ibn Muḥammad ibn Aḥmad Abī ʿAwn ibn Hilāl Abi ʾl-Najm (died 933/4), usually known as Ibn Abī ʿAwn, was an Iraqi writer and poet from al-Anbār. A kātib (secretary) by profession, he was known as al-Kātib al-Baghdādī. His kunya is uncertain.

== Life ==
Ibn Abī ʿAwn's father, grandfather and great-grandfather (Muḥammad, Aḥmad and Hilāl) were all poets. His father, who served as chamberlain to Muḥammad ibn ʿAbd Allāh ibn Ṭāhir and as governor of Wāsiṭ (866), addressed poems to Ibn al-Rūmī. Ibn Abī ʿAwn was a friend of the viziers Ḥāmid ibn al-ʿAbbās and Ibn al-Furāt. He rose to become chief of police (ṣāḥib al-shurṭa). According to the Fihrist and the Farq, he became a disciple of the heretic al-Shalmaghānī, who claimed to be God incarnate. When ordered by the caliph al-Rāḍī to strike al-Shalmaghānī, he instead kissed his beard and declared him to be his god. As a result, in AH 322 (AD 933–934), he was hanged. As there is no hint of heresy in his writings, it is possible that he was a victim of political intrigue.

== Works ==
Ibn Abī ʿAwn is the author of six or seven known works. Three are lost:

- Kitāb al-Dawāwīn
- Kitāb al-Rasāʾil
- Kitāb Bayt mal al-surūr

Four are extant:

- Kitāb al-Tashbīhāt, a book of similes
- Lubb al-ādāb fī radd jawāb dhawi ʾl-albāb, an anthology of 1,394 bon mots, belonging to the adab genre
- Kitāb al-Jawābāt al-muskita, listed in anthologies but probably an alternative title of the Lubb
- Kitāb Nawāḥi ʾl-buldān

== Bibliography ==
- Carter, M. G. (1990). "Review of Yousef 1988". Middle East Studies Association Bulletin. 24 (2): 253–254. doi:10.1017/s0026318400023580.
- Khān, M. A. Muʿīd (1939). A Critical Edition, with Notes and Indices, of the Kitāb al Tashbīhāt of Ibn Abī ʿAun (PhD dissertation). University of Cambridge.
- Khān, M. A. Muʿīd, ed. (1950). Kitāb al Tashbīhāt of Ibn Abī ʿAun: The Book of Similes. Gibb Memorial Series. Luzac.
- Khān, M. A. Muʿīd (1971). "Ibn Abī ʿAwn". In Lewis, B.; Ménage, V. L.; Pellat, Ch. & Schacht, J. (eds.). The Encyclopaedia of Islam, Second Edition. Volume III: H–Iram. Leiden: E. J. Brill. OCLC 495469525.
- Pellat, Charles (1993). "Muḥammad b. ʿAlī al-Shalmaghānī". In Bosworth, C. E.; van Donzel, E.; Heinrichs, W. P. & Pellat, Ch. (eds.). The Encyclopaedia of Islam, Second Edition. Volume VII: Mif–Naz. Leiden: E. J. Brill. ISBN 978-90-04-09419-2.
- Yousef, May A., ed. (1988). Das Buch der schlagfertigen Antworten von Ibn Abi 'Awn: Ein Werk der klassisch-arabischen Adab-Literatur. Einleitung, Edition und Quellenanalyse. Islamkundliche Untersuchungen, Vol. 125. Klaus Schwarz Verlag. doi:10.1515/9783112400838.
