= Islamkundliche Untersuchungen =

Series of publications on Islamic studies

Islamkundliche Untersuchungen (est. 1970) is a series of scholarly publications in the field of Islamic studies issued by the Klaus Schwarz Verlag of Berlin, Germany. Most of the texts are in German, with some in English, French or other languages.

== List of titles ==
=== Number 1-99 (1970-1984) ===
1. Quellenstudien zur frühen Mamlukenzeit / Ulrich Haarmann. Freiburg i. Br.: Schwarz, 1970
2. Prophetenwunder in der Aschariyya|Aš'arīya bis al-Ġazālī: Algazel. / Peter Antes. Freiburg i. Br.: Schwarz, 1970.
3. Osmanische Polemik gegen die Safawiden im 16. Jahrhundert nach arabischen Handschriften / Elke Eberhard. - Freiburg i.Br.: Schwarz, 1970
4. Erziehung und Bildung im Schahname von Firdousi: eine Studie zur Geschichte der Erziehung im alten Iran / Dariusch Bayat-Sarmadi. - Freiburg i. Br.: Schwarz, 1970
5. Die frühen Safawiden nach Qāẓī Aḥmad Qumī / Erika Glassen, Freiburg i. Br. 1970
6. Turkmenen|Turkmenische Herrscher des 15. Jahrhunderts in Persien und Mesopotamien nach dem Tārīẖ al-Ġiyāṯī / Marianne Schmidt-Dumont. - Freiburg im Breisgau: Schwarz, 1970
7. Osmanen|Osmanische Sultansurkunden des Katharinenkloster (Sinai)|Sinai-Klosters in türkischer Sprache / Klaus Schwarz. - Freiburg i. Br.: Schwarz, 1970
8. Beiträge zur Ayyubiden|ayyubidischen Diplomatik / Hein, Horst-Adolf, Freiburg i.Br.. Schwarz. 1971
9. Der arabische Dialekt von Mekka: Abriß d. Grammatik mit Texten u. Glossar. Giselher Schreiber. Freiburg i. Br.: Schwarz, 1971
10. Die Kapitel über Traumtheorie und Traumdeutung aus dem kitāb at-taḥrīr fī'ilm at-tafsīr des Ḍiyā'ad-Dīn al-Ǧazīrī: (7./13. Jh.) / Diyā'ad-dīn al- Ǧazīrī; Cherifa Magdi. Freiburg i. Br.: Schwarz, 1971.
11. Der aserbeidschanische Dialekt von Schahpur: Phonologie und Morphologie / Manutschehr Amirpur-Ahrendjani. - Freiburg i. Br.: Schwarz, 1971
12. Die Frauen im Schahname: ihre Geschichte und Stellung unter gleichzeitiger Berücksichtigung vor- und nachislamischer Quellen / Djalal Khaleghi Motlagh. - Freiburg i. Br.: Schwarz, 1971
13. Der osmanische Historiker Ḥüseyn b. Ǧaʿfer, genannt Hezārfenn, und die Istanbuler Gesellschaft in der zweiten Hälfte des 17. Jahrhunderts / Heidrun Wurm. - Freiburg im Breisgau: Schwarz, 1971
14. Briefe und Reden des Abū Ḥāmid Muḥammad al-Ġazzālī / Abū-Ḥāmid Muḥammad Ibn-Muḥammad al- Ġazzālī. - Freiburg im Breisgau: Schwarz, 1971
15. Beiträge zur Mamluken|mamlukischen Historiographie nach dem Tode al-Malik an-Nāṣirs / Barbara Schäfer. - Freiburg (i. B.): Schwarz, 1971
16. Zur Theologie der Schiʿa: eine Untersuchung des Ǧāmiʿ al-asrār wa-manbaʿ al-anwār von Sayyid Ḥaidar Āmolī / Peter Antes. - Freiburg (im Breisgau): Schwarz, 1971
17. Athanasius von Qūṣ Qilādat at-taḥrīr fī ʿilm at-tafsīr: eine koptische Grammatik in arabischer Sprache aus dem 13./14. Jh. / Athanasius <von Qūṣ>. - 1972
18. Die Kopten in der ägyptischen Gesellschaft: von der Mitte des 19. Jahrhunderts bis 1923 / Doris Behrens-Abouseif. - Freiburg im Breisgau: Schwarz, 1972
19. Die Terminologie Ibn ʿArabīs im "Kitāb wasāʾil as-sāʾil" des Ibn-Saudakīn: Text, Übersetzung und Analyse / Manfred Profitlich. - Freiburg im Breisgau: Schwarz, 1973
20. Geschichte und Geschichtsschreiber der ʿAbd al-Wādiden: Algerien im 13.-15. Jahrhundert; mit einer Teiledition des Naẓm ad-Durr des Muḥammad b. ʿAbd al-Ǧalīl at-Tanasī / Hars Kurio. - Freiburg im Breisgau: K. Schwarz, 1973
21. Abū 'l-Ḥasan ʿAlī: Merinidenpolitik zwischen Nordafrika und Spanien in den Jahren 710-752 H./1310-1351 / Rudolf Thoden. - Freiburg (im Breisgau): Schwarz, 1973
22. Leben und Weltbild des altosmanischen Dichters Aḥmedī unter besonderer Berücksichtigung seines Diwans / Tunca Kortantamer. - Freiburg (im Breisgau): Schwarz, 1973
23. Ägypten und Syrien zwischen 1317 und 1341 in der Chronik des Mufaḍḍal b. Abī l-Faḍā'il / Samira Kortantamer. - Freiburg Br.: Schwarz, 1973
24. Edirne vakasi = Das Ereignis von Edirne / Heinrich Georg Baum. - Freiburg im Br.: Schwarz, 1973
25. Transoxanien und Turkestan zu Beginn des 16. Jahrhunderts: das Mihmān-nāma-yi Buḫārā des Faḍlallāh b. Rūzbihān Ḫunǧī; Übersetzung und Kommentar / Faḍlallāh Ibn-Rūzbihān Ḫunǧī. - Freiburg im Breisgau: Schwarz, 1974
26. Der Islam in Werken moderner türkischer Schriftsteller: 1923 – 1950 / Kerim Yavuz. - Freiburg i.Br.: Schwarz, 1974
27. Leben und Dichtung des Omaiyadenkalifen al-Walīd Ibn-Yazīd: ein quellenkritischer Beitrag / Dieter Derenk. - Freiburg i.Br.: Schwarz, 1974
28. Aus den Aufzeichnungen des Saʿīd Giray Sulṭān: eine zeitgenössische Quelle zur Geschichte des Khanat der Krim|Chanats der Krim um die Mitte des 18. Jahrhunderts / Barbara Kellner-Heinkele. - Freiburg i. Br.: Schwarz, 1975
29. Briefe und Urkunden aus der Kanzlei Uzun Hasans: ein Beitrag zur Geschichte Ost-Anatoliens im 15. Jahrhundert / Mehmet Şefik Keçik. - Freiburg im Breisgau: Schwarz, 1976
30. Die Ortsnamen der europäischen Türkei nach amtlichen Verzeichnissen und Kartenwerken / Klaus Kreiser. - Freiburg: Schwarz, 1975
31. Zur Soziologie des Schiiten|schiitischen Chiliasmus: ein Beitrag zur Erforschung des irakischen Schiitische Passionsspiele|Passionsspiels / Ibrahim al- Haidari. - Freiburg im Br.: Schwarz, 1975
32. Die altosmanischen Chroniken als Quelle zur türkischen Volkskunde / Hasan Özdemir. - Freiburg i. Br.: Schwarz, 1975
33. Edirne im 17. Jahrhundert nach Evliyā Çelebī: ein Beitrag zur Kenntnis der osmanischen Stadt / Klaus Kreiser. - Freiburg im Breisgau: Schwarz, 1975
34. Riʾāsa und qaḍāʾ: Institutionen als Ausdruck wechselnder Kräfteverhältnisse in syrischen Städten vom 10. bis zum 12. Jahrhundert / Axel Havemann. - Freiburg im Breisgau: Schwarz, 1975
35. Verdienst und Rang: die Fadā'il|Faḍā'il als literarisches und gesellschaftliches Problem im Islam / Ernst August Gruber. - Freiburg im Breisgau: Schwarz, 1975
36. Ibn ar-Rāhibs Leben und Werk: ein Kopten|koptisch-arabischer Enzyklopädist des 7./13. Jahrhunderts / Adel Y. Sidarus. - Freiburg im Breisgau: Schwarz, 1975
37. Krimtatarische Sprache|Krimtatarische Urkunden im Reichsarchiv zu Kopenhagen: mit historisch-diplomatischen und sprachlichen Untersuchungen / Josef Matuz. - Freiburg im Breisgau: K. Schwarz, 1976
38. Über die Steine: das 14. Kapitel aus dem "Kitāb al-Muršid" des Muḥammad Ibn Aḥmad at-Tamīmī, nach dem Pariser Manuskript herausgegeben, übersetzt und kommentiert / Jutta Schönfeld. - Freiburg im Breisgau: Schwarz, 1976
39. Beiträge zur Geschichte des osmanischen Ägyptens: nach arabischen Sultans- und Statthalterurkunden des Katharinenkloster (Sinai)|Sinai-Klosters / Robert Humbsch. - Freiburg im Breisgau: Schwarz, 1976
40. Die Territorialverwaltung im östlichen Teil der europäischen Türkei vom Erlass der Vilayetsordnung (1864) bis zum Berliner Kongress (1878) nach amtlichen osmanischen Veröffentlichungen / Hans-Jürgen Kornrumpf. - Freiburg Br.: Schwarz, 1976
41. Die Staats- und Gesellschaftstheorie bei Sayyid Gamāladdīn, "Al Afghāni", als Beitrag zur Reform der islamischen Gesellschaften in der zweiten Hälfte des 19. Jahrhunderts / Hani Srour. - Freiburg: Schwarz, 1977
42. Zum Verhältnis von Autor und Werk bei dem modernpersischen Erzähler Ṣâdeq Hedâyat / Eberhard Krüger. - Freiburg im Breisgau: Schwarz, 1977
43. Der Briefwechsel Abbas Mirzas mit dem britischen Gesandten MacDonald Kinneir im Zeichen des Zweiter russisch-persischer Krieg|zweiten russisch-persischen Krieges: (1825-1828). Ein Beitr. z. Geschichte d. persisch-englischen Beziehungen i. d. frühen Kadscharenzeit / Ekbal, Kamran, Freiburg. Schwarz. 1977
44. Studien zum Diwan (Ra'i)|Diwan des Ra'i an-Numairi|Ra'i / Reinhard Weipert. - Freiburg: Schwarz, 1977
45. Die Revolte des Ibn al-Ašʿaṯ und die Koranleser: ein Beitrag zur Religions- und Sozialgeschichte der frühen Umayyadenzeit / Redwan Sayed. - Freiburg: Schwarz, 1977
46. Kitbuġā und Lāǧīn: Studien zur Mamluken-Geschichte nach Baibars al-Mansūrī und an-Nuwairī / Shah Morad Elham. - Freiburg: Schwarz, 1977
47. Untersuchungen zum persischen Papageienbuch des Naḫšabī / Mahroo Hatami. - Freiburg im Breisgau: Schwarz, 1977
48. Zu den Osmanische Sprache|osmanischen Verbformen des 16. Jahrhunderts nach dem Mecmūʿ-i Menāzil des Maṭrāqçī Naṣūḥ / Irene Waetzoldt. - Freiburg: Schwarz, 1978
49. Formantien im Krimtatarische Sprache|Krimtatarischen / Ilhan Çeneli. - Freiburg: Schwarz, 1979
50. Fazıl Hüsnü Dağlarca: Weltschöpfung und Tiersymbolik / Gisela Kraft. - Freiburg i.Br.: Schwarz, 1978
51. Die Siedlungsnamen Westthrakiens nach amtlichen Verzeichnissen und Kartenwerken / Klaus Kreiser. - Freiburg: Schwarz, 1978
52. Kritische Untersuchungen zum Dīwān|Diwan des Kumait_Ibn_Zaid / Kathrin Müller. - Freiburg: Schwarz, 1979
53. Gesellschaftlicher Rang und ethnische Legitimation: der arabische Schriftsteller Abū ʿUṯmān al-Ǧāḥiẓ (gest. 868) über die Afrikaner, Perser und Araber in der islamischen Gesellschaft / Susanne Enderwitz. - Freiburg i.Br.: Schwarz, 1979
54. Rosemarie Quiring-Zoche (1980). Isfahan im 15. und 16. Jahrhundert: Ein Beitrag zur persischen Stadtgeschichte.
55. Ideologie und Politik der Muslimbrüder Syriens: von den Wahlen 1947 bis zum Verbot unter Adib asch-Schischakli|Adīb aš-Šīšaklī 1952 / Johannes Reissner. - Freiburg im Breisgau: Schwarz, 1980
56. The Ottoman Jewish communities and their role in the fifteenth and sixteenth centuries / Mark A. Epstein. - Freiburg im Breisgau: Schwarz, 1980
57. Die Kunst des Sklavenkaufs: nach arabischen, persischen und türkischen Ratgebern vom 10. bis zum 18. Jahrhundert / Hans Müller. - Freiburg i.Br.: Schwarz, 1980
58. Al-Ḥakīm at-Tirmiḏi: ein islamischer Theosoph des 3./9. Jahrhunderts / Bernd Radtke. - Freiburg: Schwarz Verl., 1980
59. Der geistige Hintergrund des türkischen Historikers Ahmed Zeki Velidi Togan: nach seinen Memoiren / Friedrich Bergdolt. - Berlin: Schwarz, 1981
60. Das Kitāb ar-rauḍ al-ʿāṭir des Ibn-Aiyūb: Damaskus|Damaszener Biographien des 10./16. Jahrhunderts, Beschreibung und Edition / Mūsā Ibn-Yūsuf Ibn-Aiyūb al-Anṣārī. - Berlin: Schwarz, 1981
61. Frankreich und die Syrische Christen|syrischen Christen 1799-1861: Minoritäten und europäischer Imperialismus im Vorderer Orient|Vorderen Orient / Alfred Schlicht. - Berlin: Schwarz, 1981
62. Waṣf bei Kušāǧim: eine Studie zur beschreibenden Dichtkunst der Abbasidenzeit / Alma Giese. - Berlin: Schwarz, 1981
63. Helene Gartmann (1981). Zur Situation der Frau im Gecekondu: eine Untersuchung über die Lebensverhältnisse von Frauen in einem durch Zuwanderung aus dem Landesinnern entstandenen Stadtrandgebiet von Ankara (in German). ISBN 3922968074.
64. Die Türkei: das Phänomen des abhängigen Kapitalismus / Judit Balázs. - Berlin [u.a.]: Schwarz, 1984
65. Artisans and guild life in the later Safavid period: contributions to the social-economic history of Persia / Mehdi Keyvani. - Berlin: Klaus Schwarz, 1982
66. Candid penstrokes: the lyrics of Me'ālī, an Ottoman poet of the 16th century / Me'ālī. - Berlin: Schwarz, 1982
67. L'enseignement religieux dans la Turquie moderne / P. Xavier Jacob. - Berlin: Schwarz, 1982
68. Regesten publizierter Safawiden|safawidischer Herrscherurkunden: Erlasse und Staatsschreiben der frühen Neuzeit Irans / Renate Schimkoreit. - Berlin: Schwarz, 1982
69. Soziale Beziehungen und ihr wirtschaftlicher Ausdruck: Untersuchungen zur städtischen Gesellschaft des Naher Osten|Nahen Ostens am Beispiel Deir ez-Zor|Dair az-Zōr (Ostsyrien) / Annegret Nippa. - Berlin: Schwarz, 1982
70. Quellenuntersuchungen zum Kitāb al-ʿIqd al-farīd des Andalusien|Andalusiers Ibn ʿAbdrabbih (246/860 - 328/940): ein Beitrag zur arabischen Literaturgeschichte / Walter Werkmeister. - Berlin: Schwarz, 1983
71. Schejch Nureddin al-Dscherrahi|Nureddin Mehmed Cerrahî und sein Orden: (1721 - 1925) / Şenay Yola. - Berlin: Schwarz, 1982
72. Monika Gronke [in German] (1982). Arabische und persische Privaturkunden des 12. und 13. Jahrhunderts aus Ardabil (Aserbeidschan) (in German). ISBN 3922968163.
73. Regionale Reformen im Osmanisches Reich|Osmanischen Reich am Vorabend der Tanzimat: Reformen der rumelischen Provinzialgouverneure im Gerichtssprengel von Bitola|Monastir (Bitola) zur Zeit der Herrschaft Sultan Mahmud II.|Mahmuds II. (1808–39) / Michael Ursinus. - Berlin: Schwarz, 1982
74. Untersuchungen zur historischen Volkskunde Ägyptens nach Mamluken|mamlukischen Quellen / Barbara Langner. - Berlin: Schwarz, 1983
75. Männer um Bāyezīd: Eine prosopograph. Studie über d. Epoche Sultan Bayezid II.|Bāyezīds II. <1481-1512> / Hedda Reindl. - Berlin: Schwarz, 1983
76. Die Entstehung und Entwicklung der osmanisch-türkischen Paläographie und Diplomatik: mit einer Bibliographie / Valery Stojanow. - Berlin: Schwarz, 1983
77. Egypt and the Palestine question 1936 – 1945 / Thomas Mayer. - Berlin: Schwarz, 1983
78. Osmanische Sprache|Osmanisches Wortgut im Ägyptisch-Arabischen / Erich Prokosch. - Berlin: Schwarz, 1983
79. Rurale Bewegungen im Libanongebirge des 19. Jahrhunderts: ein Beitrag zur Problematik sozialer Veränderungen / Axel Havemann. - Berlin: Schwarz, 1983
80. Die Stiftungen des Osmanisches Reich|osmanischen Großwesirs Koca Sinan Pascha|Koǧa Sinān Pascha (gest. 1596) in Uzunǧaova, Bulgarien / Klaus Schwarz. - Berlin: Schwarz, 1983
81. Egypt, Islam and social change: Al-Azhar in conflict and accommodation / A. Chris Eccel. - Berlin: Schwarz, 1984
82. Talikizâde|Taʿlīḳī-zāde's Şehnāme-i hümāyūn: a history of the Osmanisches Reich|Ottoman campaign into Ungarn|Hungary 1593 – 94 / Taʿlīḳī-zāde. - Berlin: Schwarz, 1983
83. Celali-Aufstände|The great Anatolian rebellion: 1000-1020/1591-1611 / William J. Griswold. - Berlin: Schwarz, 1983
84. Die Ibāḍiten im Maġrib (2./8. - 4./10. Jh.): die Geschichte einer Berberbewegung im Gewand des Islam / Ulrich Rebstock. - Berlin: Schwarz, 1983
85. Mädchennamen - verrätselt: 100 Rätsel-Epigramme aus d. adab-Werk Alf ǧāriya wa-ǧāriya (7./13. Jh.) / Jürgen W. Weil. - Berlin: Schwarz, 1984
86. Das Problem der transzendenten sinnlichen Wahrnehmung in der spätmu'tazilitischen Erkenntnistheorie nach der Darstellung des Taqiaddin an-Nagrani. Elshahed (Elsayed) - Berlin, Schwarz, 1983
87. Auxiliarfunktionen von Hauptverben nach Konverb in der Uigurische Sprache|neuuigurischen Schriftsprache von Xinjiang|Sinkiang / Wolfgang-Ekkehard Scharlipp. - Berlin: Schwarz, 1984
88. Die Kurden|kurdische Nationalbewegung im Irak: eine Fallstudie zur Problematik ethnischer Konflikte in d. Dritte Welt|Dritten Welt / Ferhad Ibrahim. - Berlin: Schwarz, 1983
89. Osmanische Sprache|Osmanisches Wortgut im Sudanesisch-Arabisch|Sudan-Arabischen / Erich Prokosch. - Berlin: Schwarz, 1983
90. Sabahattin Ali, Mystiker und Sozialist: Beiträge zur Interpretation eines modernen türkischen Autors / Elisabeth Siedel. - Berlin: Schwarz, 1983
91. The origins and development of the Osmanisches Reich|Ottoman-Safawiden|Ṣafavid conflict: <906-962/1500-1555> / Adel Allouche. - Berlin: Schwarz, 1983
92. Untersuchungen zu einer Sammlung persischer Erzählungen: Čihil wa-šiš ḥikāyat yā ǧāmiʿ al-ḥikāyāt / Roxane Haag-Higuchi. - Berlin: Schwarz, 1984
93. Unsere Wirtschaft: eine gekürzte kommentierte Übersetzung des Buches ʿIqtisādunā / Muhammad Baqir as-Sadr|Muḥammad Bāqir aṣ- Ṣadr. - Berlin: Schwarz, c 1984
94. Der Bedeutungswandel der Hedschasbahn: eine historisch-geographische Untersuchung / Ulrich Fiedler. - Berlin: Schwarz, 1984
95. Die islamisch-rechtlichen Auskünfte der Millî Gazete im Rahmen des "Fetwa-Wesen" der Türkische Republik|Türkischen Republik. Debus, Esther. Berlin: Schwarz
96. Die Siedlungsnamen Griechisch-Makedoniens nach amtlichen Verzeichnissen und Kartenwerken / Eberhard Krüger. - Berlin: Schwarz, 1984
97. Seldschuken|Seldschukische Geschichte und türkische Geschichtswissenschaft: die Seldschuken im Urteil moderner türkischer Historiker / Martin Strohmeier. - Berlin: Schwarz, 1984
98. Arabic literary works as a source of documentation for technical terms of the material culture / Dionisius A. Agius. - Berlin: Schwarz, 1984
99. The Egyptian elite under Evelyn Baring, 1. Earl of Cromer|Cromer, 1882 – 1907 / Collins, Jeffrey G. Berlin. Schwarz. 1984
100. The office of Qādī|qâḍî al-quḍât in Kairo|Cairo under the Bahri-Dynastie|Baḥrî Mamlûks / Joseph H. Escovitz. - Berlin: Schwarz, 1984
101. Ottoman rule in Jerusalem: 1890-1914 / Haim Gerber. - Berlin: Schwarz, 1985
102. Die Türkei im Spannungsfeld extremer Ideologien: (1973-1980): e. Unters. d. polit. Verhältnisse. Otmar Oehring. Berlin: Schwarz, 1984.
103. Türkische Sprache|Türkische Freitagspredigten: Studien zum Islam in der heutigen Türkei / Sabine Prätor. - Berlin: Schwarz, 1985
104. Untersuchungen zur Verfassung der Islamischen Republik Iran vom 15. November 1979 / Silvia Tellenbach. - Berlin: Schwarz, 1985
105. Libya between Ottomanism and nationalism: the Ottoman involvement in Libya during the war with Italy (1911-1919) / Rachel Simon. - Berlin: Schwarz, 1987
106. Labsal dessen, der bei Tag und bei Nacht reist / Sabine Schupp. - Berlin: Schwarz, 1985
107. Volksmacht und Islam: eine terminologie- und ideologieanalytische Untersuchung zum Politik- und Religionsverständnis bei Muammar al-Gaddafi|Muʿammar al-Qaḏḏāfī / Eva Hager. - Berlin: Schwarz, 1985
108. Die Chronik des ʿİsazade: ein Beitrag zur osmanischen Historiographie des 17. Jahrhunderts / Johann Strauß. - Berlin: Schwarz, 1991
109. The reign of Sultan Selim I.|Selīm I in the light of the Selīm-nāme literature / Ahmet Uğur. - Berlin: Schwarz, 1985
110. Reinkarnatio|Seelenwanderung in der islamischen Häresie / Rainer Freitag. - Berlin: Schwarz, 1985
111. Zum schriftlichen Gebrauch des kairinischen Dialekts anhand ausgewählter Texte von Saʿdaddīn Wahba / Renate Malina. - Berlin: Schwarz, c 1987
112. Sultan Abdulhamid II. im Spiegel der arabischen Dichtung: eine Studie zu Literatur und Politik in der Spätperiode des Osmanisches Reich|Osmanischen Reiches / Turki Mugheid. - Berlin: Schwarz, c 1987
113. Al-Quds al-Mamlûkiyya: a history of Mamluken|Mamlûk Jerusalem based on the Haram-Urkunden|Ḥaram documents * / Huda Lutfi. - Berlin: Schwarz, 1985
114. Economic survey of Syria during the tenth and eleventh centuries: survey / Muhsin D. Yusuf. - Berlin: Schwarz, 1985
115. Die religiöse Lage in der Türkei: Perspektiven des islamischen Religionsunterrichts für türkische Kinder in der Diaspora / Saliha Scheinhardt. - Berlin: Schwarz, 1986
116. Loġaz und Moʿammā: eine Quellenstudie zur Kunstform des persischen Rätsels / Šams Anwarī-al-Ḥusainī. - [Berlin]: [Schwarz], [1986]
117. Die schiitische Gemeinschaft des Südlibanon (Jabal Amel|Ǧabal ʿĀmil) innerhalb des libanesischen konfessionellen Systems / Monika Pohl-Schöberlein. - Berlin: Schwarz, 1986
118. Der Teufel in der modernen arabischen Literatur: Die Rezeption e. europ. Motivs in d. arabischen Belletristik, Dramatik und Poesie d. 19. u. 20. Jhs / Ḫalīl Šaiḫ. - Berlin: Schwarz, 1986
119. Le châh et les Kizilbasch|qizilbāš: le systeme militaire safavide / Masashi Haneda. - Berlin: Schwarz, 1987
120. Ein hagiographisches Zeugnis zur persischen Geschichte aus der Mitte des 14. Jahrhunderts: das achte Kapitel des Ṣafwat aṣ-ṣafā in kritischer Bearbeitung / Heidi Zirke. - Berlin: Schwarz, 1987
121. Die Geschichte der Artuqiden|artuqidischen Fürstentümer in Syrien und der Ǧazīra'l-Furātīya <496-812/1002-1409> / Gerhard Väth. - Berlin: Schwarz, 1987
122. Liebe und Mannesehre: Szenen einer muslimischen Kleinbürgerehe beleuchtet anhand des Romans "Der Ölzweig" (Ġuṣn az-zaytūn) von M. ʻAbdalḥalīm ʻAbdallāh / Stephan Guth. Berlin: Klaus Schwarz, 1987.
123. Das Verhältnis von Poesie und Prosa in der arabischen Literaturtheorie des Mittelalters / Zijād ar-Ramaḍān az- Zuʿbī. - Berlin: Schwarz, 1987
124. Azeri and Persian literary works in twentieth century Iranian Azerbaijan / Sakina Berengian. - Berlin: Schwarz, 1988
125. Das Buch der schlagfertigen Antworten = Al-Aǧwibat al-muskitat / Ibrāhīm ibn Muḥammad Ibn Abī ʻAwn; May A Yūssif. Berlin: K. Schwarz, 1988.
126. Die Kizilbasch|Kızılbaş-Aleviten: Untersuchungen über eine esoterische Glaubensgemeinschaft in Anatolien / Krisztina Kehl-Bodrogi. - Berlin: Schwarz, 1988
127. Die Stadt in der arabischen Poesie, bis 1258 n. Chr. / Ḥusain Baijūd. - Berlin: K. Schwarz, 1988
128. Chorasantürkische Materialien aus Kalāt bei Esfarāyen / Sultan Tulu. - Berlin: Schwarz, 1989
129. Die Epitome der Universalchronik Ibn ad-Dawādārīs im Verhältnis zur Langfassung: eine quellenkritische Studie zur Geschichte der ägyptischen Mamluken / Gunhild Graf. - Berlin: Schwarz, c 1990
130. Die Moschee Nuruosmaniye-Moschee|Nûruosmâniye in Istanbul: Beitr. zur Baugeschichte nach osman. Quellen / Pia Hochhut. - Berlin: Schwarz, 1986
131. The Ottoman Ulama|ʿulemā in the mid-17th century: an analysis of the Vaḳāʾi ʿüʾl-fużalā of Meḥmed Şeyḫī Ef. / Ali Uğur. - Berlin: Schwarz Verlag, 1986
132. Al-Muntahā fi l-kamāl des Muḥammad Ibn Sahl Ibn al-Marzubān al-Karẖī (gest. ca. 345/956): Untersuchung und kritische Edition von Bd. 4-5 und 9-10 / Muḥammad Ibn-Sahl Ibn-al-Marzubān. - Berlin: Schwarz, 1988
133. The Fatimid vizierate: 969 – 1172 / Leila S. al- Imad. - Berlin: Schwarz, c 1990
134. The evolution of a Sufi institution in Mamluk Egypt: the Khanqah / Leonor Fernandes. - Berlin: Schwarz, 1988
135. Muṣṭafā ʿĀlī's Furṣat-nāme: Edition und Bearbeitung einer Quelle zur Geschichte des persischen Feldzugs unter Koca Sinan Pascha|Sinān Paša 1580 – 1581 / Muṣṭafā Ibn-Aḥmed ʿĀlī. - Berlin: Schwarz, 1989
136. Der Orientalist Johann Gottfried Wetzstein als preussischer Konsul in Damaskus, 1849-1861: dargestellt nach seinen hinterlassenen Papieren / Ingeborg Huhn. Berlin: K. Schwarz, 1989.
137. Westliche Islamwissenschaft im Spiegel muslimischer Kritik: Grundzüge und aktuelle Merkmale einer innerislamischen Diskussion / Ekkehard Rudolph. - Berlin: Schwarz, 1991
138. The Yaresan: a sociological, historical and religio-historical study of a Kurdish community / M. Reza Hamzeh'ee . - Berlin: Schwarz, 1990
139. Die persische Gesellschaft unter Nāṣiru'd-Dīn Šāh: (1848 - 1896) / Heinz-Georg Migeod. Berlin: Schwarz, 1990
140. ʿAlī Mubārak und seine Ḫiṭaṭ: kommentierte Übersetzung der Autobiographie und Werkbesprechung / Stephan Fliedner. - Berlin: Schwarz, 1990
141. Die Kritik der Prosa bei den Arabern: (vom 3./9. Jahrhundert bis zum Ende des 5./11. Jahrhunderts) / Mahmoud Darabseh. - Berlin: Schwarz, 1990
142. Les mouvements révolutionnaires et la constitution de 1906 en Iran / Djafar Shafiei-Nasab. - Berlin: Schwarz, c 1991
143. Der Handel im mālikitischen Recht: am Beispiel des k. al-buyūʿ im Kitāb al-Muwaṭṭaʾ des Mālik b. Anas und des salam aus der Mudawwana al-kubrā von Saḥnūn / Rüdiger Lohlker. - Berlin: Schwarz, c 1991
144. Die mamlukische Architektur der Stadt Gaza (Stadt)|Gaza / Mohamed-Moain Sadek. - Berlin: Schwarz, 1991
145. Von Kairo nach Mekka: Sozial- und Wirtschaftsgeschichte der Pilgerfahrt nach den Berichten des Ibrāhīm Rifʻat Bāšā, Mirʼāt al-Ḥaramain / Rita Stratkötter. Berlin: K. Schwarz, 1991
146. Avicennas Bearbeitungen der aristotelischen Rhetorik: ein Beitrag zum Fortleben antiken Bildungsgutes in der islamischen Welt / Renate Würsch. - Berlin: Schwarz, c 1991
147. Das Fest des Fastenbrechens (ʿīd al-fiṭr) in Ägypten: Untersuchungen zu theologischen Grundlagen und praktischer Gestaltung / Laila Nabhan. - Berlin: Schwarz, 1991
148. Das erzählerische Werk der türkischen Autorin Sevgi Soysal: (1936 - 1976) / Priska Furrer. - Berlin: Schwarz, 1992
149. Bamberger Mittelasienstudien: Konferenzakten, Bamberg 15. - 16. Juni 1990 / Bert G. Fragner. - Berlin: Schwarz, 1994
150. Festgabe an Josef Matuz: Osmanistik - Turkologie – Diplomatik / Christa Fragner. - Berlin: Schwarz, 1992
151. Nomadenstämme in Perserreich|Persien im 18. und 19. Jahrhundert. Marina Kunke. Berlin: Klaus Schwarz, 1991.
152. The theology of al-ʿAllāma al-Ḥillī: (d. 726/1325) / Sabine Schmidtke. - Berlin: Schwarz, 1991
153. Timuriden|Timuridische Emire nach dem Muʿizz al-ansāb: Untersuchung zur Stammesaristokratie Zentralasiens im 14. und 15. Jahrhundert / Shiro Ando. - Berlin: Schwarz, 1992
154. Qanāʿa (Genügsamkeit) in der arabischen Literatur anhand des Kitāb al-Qanāʿa wa-t-taʿaffuf von Ibn-Abī-d-Dunyā / Stefan Weninger. - Berlin: Schwarz, 1992
155. Studien zum ältesten alchemistischen Schrifttum: auf der Grundlage zweier erstmals edierter arabischer Hermetica / Ingolf Vereno. - Berlin: Schwarz, 1992
156. Die Juden in der Palästinensische Literatur|palästinensischen Literatur zwischen 1913 und 1987 / Adel al- Osta. - Berlin: Schwarz, 1993
157. Islam und Unterentwicklung: konzeptionelle Ansätze zur Überwindung der Unterentwicklung in islamischen Wirtschaftstheorien - das Beispiel Iran / Irina Hetsch. - Berlin: Schwarz, 1992
158. Iran und die Reformbewegung im Osmanisches Reich|Osmanischen Reich: persische Staatsmänner, Reisende und Oppositionelle unter dem Einfluss der Tanẓīmāt / Anja Pistor-Hatam. - Berlin: Schwarz, 1992
159. Eine Stadtgeschichte Alexandrias von 564/1169 bis in die Mitte des 9./15. Jahrhunderts: Verwaltung und innerstädtische Organisationsformen / Martina Müller-Wiener. - Berlin: Schwarz, 1992
160. Zeugen einer Endzeit: fünf Schriftsteller zum Umbruch in der ägyptischen Gesellschaft nach 1970 / Stephan Guth. - Berlin: Schwarz, 1992
161. Zerfall der Staatsmacht Perserreich|Persiens unter Nāṣir-ad-Dīn Schah Qāğār (1848 - 1896): Einblicke in die Machtverhältnisse am Teheraner Hof nach den Tagebüchern Iʿtimād as-Salṭanas / Mostafa Edjtehadi. - Berlin: Schwarz, 1992
162. Mit den Waffen des Gegners: christlich-muslimische Kontroversen im 19. und 20. Jahrhundert; dargestellt am Beispiel der Auseinandersetzung um Karl Gottlieb Pfander. "Mîzân al-ḥaqq" und Rahmatallāh al-Kairānawī|Raḥmatullâh Ibn Halîl al-ʿUtmânî al-Kairânawîs "Izhâr al-ḥaqq" und der Diskussion über das Barnabasevangelium / Christine Schirrmacher. - Berlin: Schwarz, 1992
163. Die Frau in Saudi-Arabien zwischen Tradition und Moderne / Holger Vagt. Berlin: K. Schwarz, 1992
164. Tod und Trauer in der Poesie des Palästinensers Maḥmūd Darwīš / Ibrahim M Abu-Hashhash. Berlin: Klaus Schwarz, 1994.
165. Die Beschreibung Indiens in der "Riḥla" des Ibn-Baṭṭūṭa: Aspekte einer herrschaftssoziologischen Einordnung des Delhi-Sultanates unter Muḥammad Ibn-Tuġluq / Stephan Conermann. - Berlin: Schwarz, c 1993
166. Aḥmadu Bamba und die Entstehung der Murīdīya: Analyse religiöser und historischer Hintergründe; Untersuchung seines Lebens und seiner Lehre anhand des biographischen Werkes von Muḥammad al-Muṣṭafā Ān / Rüdiger Seesemann. - Berlin: Schwarz, 1993
167. Doppelte Heimat?: zur literarischen Produktion arabischsprachiger Immigranten in Argentinien / Margot Scheffold. - Berlin: Schwarz, 1993
168. Adam und Eva|Adam im Islam: ein Beitrag zur Ideengeschichte der Sunna / Cornelia Schöck. - Berlin: Schwarz, 1993
169. Die Geschichte von Kain und Abel (Hābīl wa-Qābīl) in der sunnitisch-islamischen Überlieferung: Untersuchung von Beispielen aus verschiedenen Literaturwerken unter Berücksichtigung ihres Einflusses auf den Volksglauben / Waltraud Bork-Qaysieh. - Berlin: Schwarz, 1993
170. Der arabische Faktor in der jungtürkischen Politik: eine Studie zum osmanischen Parlament der II. Konstitution (1908 - 1918) / Sabine Prätor. - Berlin: Schwarz, 1993
171. "Islamischer Fundamentalismus" - Rückfall ins Mittelalter oder Wegbereiter der Moderne?: Die Stellungnahme der Forschung / Hanna Lücke. - Berlin: Schwarz, 1993
172. Die Seeaktivitäten der muslimischen Beutefahrer als Bestandteil der staatlichen Flotte während der osmanischen Expansion im Mittelmeer im 15. und 16. Jahrhundert / Andreas Rieger. - Berlin: K. Schwarz, 1994
173. The village novel in modern Egyptian literature / Ami Elad. - Berlin: Schwarz, 1994
174. Kamāl Ğunbulāṭ: das arabisch-islamische Erbe und die Rolle der Drusen in seiner Konzeption der libanesischen Geschichte. Bernadette Schenk. Berlin: Schwarz, 1994
175. Dichtung - Brücke zur Aussenwelt: Studien zur Autobiographie Fadwā Ṭūqāns / Nadja Odeh. - Berlin: Schwarz, 1994
176. Die Islamisten Ägyptens in der Regierungszeit von Anwar as-Sādāt: (1970 - 1981) / Franz Kogelmann. - Berlin: Schwarz, 1994
177. Strange bedfellows: mutʿat al-nisāʾ and mutʿat al-ḥajj: a study based on Sunnī and Shīʿī sources of Tafsīr (Koranexegese)|tafsīr, ḥadīth and fiqh / Arthur Gribetz. - Berlin: Schwarz, 1994
178. Zentralismus und Autonomie: Gelehrte und Staat in Marokko, 1900 – 1931 / Ralf Elger. - Berlin: Schwarz, 1994
179. Göttliche Karriere eines syrischen Hirten: Sulaiman Murschid|Sulaimān Muršid (1907 - 1946) und die Anfänge der Muršidiyya / Patrick Franke. - Berlin: Schwarz, 1994
180. Zwischen Charisma und Ratio: Entwicklungen in der frühen imāmitischen Theologie / Paul Sander. - Berlin: Schwarz, 1994
181. Zwischen Glaube, Nation und neuer Gemeinschaft: Aleviten|alevitische Identität in der Türkei der Gegenwart / Karin Vorhoff. - Berlin: Schwarz, 1995
182. Bamberger Zentralasienstudien: Konferenzakten/ESCAS IV, Bamberg 8. - 12. Oktober 1991 / Ingeborg Baldauf. - Berlin: Schwarz, 1994
183. Filastin, Filistin und Eretz Israel: die späte osmanische Herrschaft über Palästina in der arabischen, türkischen und israelischen Historiographie / Maurus Reinkowski. Berlin: K. Schwarz, 1995
184. Rückzug in Ehren?: Die Nahostpolitik der Briten nach der Suezkrise, 1957 - 60 / Philip Anderson. - Berlin: Schwarz, 1994
185. Die Revision der Historiographie des Osmanischen Reiches am Beispiel von Abdülhamid II.: das späte Osmanische Reich im Urteil türkischer Autoren der Gegenwart (1930 - 1990) / Claudia Kleinert. - Berlin: Schwarz, 1995
186. Von der Kritik des arabischen Denkens zum panarabischen Aufbruch: das philosophische und politische Denken Muḥammad ʿĀbid al-Ǧābirīs / Michael Gaebel. - Berlin: Schwarz, 1995
187. Islamische Heiligenverehrung im urbanen Kontext am Beispiel von Aleppo (Syrien) / Julia Gonnella. - Berlin: Schwarz, 1995
188. Politische Parteien und Bevölkerung in Iran: die Ḥezb-e Demūkrāt-e Īrān und ihr Führer Ahmad Qavām|Qavāmo s-Salṭanä / Ralph Kauz. - Berlin: Schwarz, 1995
189. al-Ibtihālāt ad dīnīya: eine Form der islamischen, religiösen Vokalmusik Ägyptens; Untersuchungen zu Ursprung und Gestalt der heutigen Praxis / Peter Bruns. - Berlin: Schwarz, 1995
190. Evolution des pratiques alimentaires en Turquie: analyse comparative. Marie-Hélène Sauner-Nebioglu. Berlin: K. Schwarz, 1995
191. Politik zwischen den Zeilen: arabische Handschriften der Wandalá in Nordkamerun: deutsch-arabische Texte. Hermann Forkl; Reinhard Weipert. Berlin: Klaus Schwarz, 1995
192. Das Christentum aus der Sicht zeitgenössischer iranischer Autoren: eine Untersuchung religionskundlicher Publikationen in persischer Sprache / Isabel Stümpel-Hatami. - Berlin: Schwarz, 1996
193. Islamisches Recht in Theorie und Praxis: Analyse einiger kaufrechtlicher Fatwas von Taqī'd-Dīn Aḥmad b. Taymiyya / Benjamin Jokisch. - Berlin: Schwarz, 1996
194. Nicht-Muslime und Fremde in Aleppo und Damaskus im 18. und in der ersten Hälfte des 19. Jahrhunderts / Yoram Shalit. - Berlin: Schwarz, 1996
195. Die koranische Herausforderung: die taḥaddī-Verse im Rahmen der Polemikpassagen des Korans / Matthias Radscheit. - Berlin: Schwarz, 1996
196. Geschichte und Ideologie: Mehmed Murad und Celal Nuri über die historischen Ursachen des osmanischen Niedergangs / Christoph Herzog. - Berlin: Schwarz, 1996
197. Muslim culture in Russia ...; [Vol. 1] Muslim culture in Russia and Central Asia from the 18th to the early 20th centuries / Michael Kemper. - Berlin: Schwarz, 1996
198. Muṣṭafā Maḥmūd (geb. 1921) und der modifizierte islamische Diskurs im modernen Ägypten / Stephan Conermann. - Berlin: Schwarz, 1996
199. Die Berber in der historischen Entwicklung Algeriens von 1949 bis 1990: zur Konstruktion einer ethnischen Identität / Gabi Kratochwil. Berlin: K. Schwarz, 1996.
200. Fāṭima von Qum: ein Beispiel für die Verehrung heiliger Frauen im Volksglauben der Zwölfer-Schia / Zohreh Sadeghi. - Berlin: Schwarz, 1996
201. Annäherung und Distanz: Schia, Azhar und die islamische Ökumene im 20. Jahrhundert / Rainer Brunner. - Berlin: Schwarz, 1996
202. Reislamisierung und Familienrecht in Algerien: der Einfluß des malikitischen Rechts auf den "Code Algérien de la famille" / Silvia Kuske. - Berlin: Schwarz, 1996
203. ʿAbd or-Raḥīm H̱ān-e H̱ānān (964 - 1036/1556 - 1627): Staatsmann und Mäzen / Eva Orthmann. - Berlin: Schwarz, 1996
204. Authentisch arabisch und dennoch modern?: Zakī Naǧīb Maḥmūds kulturtheoretische Essayistik als Beitrag zum euro-arabischen Dialog / Margot Scheffold. - Berlin: Schwarz, 1996
205. Konstantinopel und Damaskus: Gesandtschaften und Verträge zwischen Kaisern und Kalifen 639 - 750; Untersuchungen zum Gewohnheits-Völkerrecht und zur interkulturellen Diplomatie / Andreas Kaplony. - Berlin: Schwarz, 1996
206. "Die Farbe des Regens": Entstehung und Entwicklung der modernen jeminitischen Kurzgeschichte: Muḥammad ʻAbdalwalī, Zaid Muṭǐʻ Dammāǧ und Aḥmad Maḥfūẓ ʻUmar. / Günther Orth. Berlin: Klaus Schwarz, 1997
207. Atatürk und die türkische Reformpolitik im Spiegel der ägyptischen Presse: eine Inhaltsanalyse ausgewählter Pressereaktionen auf Massnahmen zur Umgestaltung des politischen, religiösen und kulturellen Lebens in der Türkei zwischen 1922 und 1938 / Richard Hattemer. Berlin: Klaus Schwarz Verlag, 1997
208. The Seldschuken|Saljūqs of Syria during the crusades 463 - 549 A.H., 1070 - 1154 A.D. / Taef Kamal el- Azhari. - Berlin: Schwarz, 1997
209. Emanzipation oder Isolation vom westlichen Lehrer?: Die Debatte um Ḥanafīs "Einführung in die Wissenschaft der Okzidentalistik. Thomas Hildebrandt. Berlin: K. Schwarz, 1998
210. Entbehrung und Lebenskampf: die Autobiographie des marokkischen Autors Mohamed Choukri / Barbara Sigge. Berlin: K. Schwarz, 1997
211. Islamische Solidarität: Geschichte, Politik, Ideologie der Organisation der Islamischen Konferenz (OIC) 1969 – 1981 / Ellinor Schöne. Berlin Schwarz 1997
212. Das Opferfest (ʿīd al-aḍḥā) im heutigen Ägypten / Mohammed Rashed. - Berlin: Schwarz, 1998
213. Muslim culture in Russia ... / Vol. 2 / Inter-regional and inter-ethnic relations / Anke von Kügelgen. - 1998
214. Hālid und ʻUmar: quellenkritische Untersuchung zur Historiographie der frühislamischen Zeit. Klaus Klier. Berlin: Klaus Schwarz, 1998
215. Sufis und Gelehrte in Tatarien und Baschkirien, 1789 - 1889: der islamische Diskurs unter russischer Herrschaft / Michael Kemper. - Berlin: Schwarz, 1998
216. American literature and orientalism. Marwan M Obeidat. Berlin: K. Schwarz, 1998
217. Zur Problematik des Demokratisierungsprozesses in Iran: eine sozio-kulturelle Analyse anhand von Entstehung und Scheitern der konstitutionellen Bewegung von 1906 / Hamid Khosravi Sharoudi. - Berlin: Schwarz, 1998
218. Islamisches Recht und sozialer Wandel in Algerien: zur Entwicklung des Personalstatuts seit 1962 / Bettina Dennerlein. - Berlin: Schwarz, 1998
219. Individuum und Gesellschaft in der Türkei: Leylâ Erbils Roman Tuhaf Bir Kadın (Eine sonderbare Frau) / Karin Schweißgut. - Berlin: Schwarz, 1999
220. Andreas Drechsler (1999), Geschichte der Stadt Qom im Mittelalter (650-1350): politische und wirtschaftliche Aspekte (in German), ISBN 3879972761
221. Fliegen die Seelen der Heiligen?: Muslimische Reform und staatliche Autorität in der Republik Mali seit 1960 / Carsten Hock. - Berlin: Schwarz, 1999
222. "Unser Weg schließt tausend Wege ein": Derwische und Gesellschaft im islamischen Mittelasien im 16. Jahrhundert. Florian Schwarz. Schwarz, Berlin 2000, ISBN 3-87997-278-8.
223. al-Juwaynī's thought and methodology: with a translation and commentary on Lumaʻ al-Adillah. Mohammad Moslem Adel Saflo. Schwarz, Berlin 2000, ISBN 3-87997-278-8.
224. Galenos|Galen: "Über die Anatomie der Nerven": Originalschrift und alexandrinisches Kompendium in arabischer Überlieferung. Ahmad M Al-Dubayan. Schwarz, Berlin 2000, ISBN 3-87997-280-X.
225. Die Risāla fī l-ḥudūṯ (Die Abhandlung über die Entstehung) von Ṣadr ad-Dīn Muḥammad Ibn Ibrāhīm aš-Šīrāzī (1572 - 1640): mit Übersetzung und Erläuterung / Sayed M. Bagher Talgharizadeh. - Berlin: Schwarz, 2000
226. Muslime und Franken (Volk)|Franken: ethnische, soziale und religiöse Gruppen im Kitāb al-Iʾtibār des Usāma ibn Munqiḏ / Alexander Schauer. - Berlin: Schwarz, 2000
227. Bagdad nach dem Sturz des Kalifats: die Geschichte einer Provinz unter Ilchane|ilḫānischer Herrschaft (656 - 735/1258 - 1335) / Hend Gilli-Elewy. - Berlin: Schwarz, 2000
228. Politische Entwicklung in einem arabischen Golfstaat: die Rolle von Interessengruppen im Emirat Kuweit / Christian Koch. Berlin: Schwarz, 2000.
229. Muslim culture in Russia ... / Vol. 3 / Arabic, Persian and Turkic manuscripts (15th - 19th centuries)/ Anke von Kügelgen. - 2000
230. Der Dichter Faiḍī und die Religion Akbars / Gerald Grobbel. - Berlin: Schwarz, 2001
231. Nationalismus und Modernismus in Iran in der Periode zwischen dem Zerfall der Qāğāren-Dynastie und der Machtfestigung Reżā Schahs: eine Untersuchung über die intellektuellen Kreise um die Zeitschriften Kāweh, Īrānšahr und Āyandeh / Keivandokht Ghahari. - Berlin: Schwarz, 2001
232. Image of the "Turk" in Italy: a history of the "other" in early modern Europe, 1453-1683 / Mustafa Soykut. Berlin: Klaus Schwarz Verlag, 2001
233. Die politische Entwicklung der Kurden im Irak von 1975 bis 1993: unter besonderer Berücksichtigung von Saddam Husseins Kurdenpolitik. Sarbest Bahjat. Berlin: K. Schwarz, 2001
234. Methoden mittelalterlicher arabischer Qur'ānexegese am Beispiel von Q 53, 1-18 / Regula Forster. Berlin: Schwarz, 2001
235. Die gesetzlichen Umgehungen im islamischen Recht (ḥiyal): unter besonderer Berücksichtigung der Ǧannat al-aḥkām wa-ǧunnat al-ẖuṣṣām des Ḥanafīten Saʿīd b. ʿAlī as-Samarqandī (gest. 12. Jhdt.) / Satoe Horii. - Berlin: Schwarz, 2001
236. ʻAbdarraḥmān al-Auzāʻī - ein Rechtsgelehrter des 2. Jahrhunderts d.H. und sein Beitrag zu den Siyar: erarbeitet auf der Grundlage des k. ar-Radd ʻalā siyar al-Auzāʻī / Anke Bouzenita. Berlin: Schwarz, 2001
237. Ehe und Ehescheidung in Tunesien: zur Stellung der Frau in Recht und Gesellschaft / Stephanie Waletzki. - Berlin: Schwarz, 2001
238. Die Entwicklung der islamischen Gemeinschaft in Deutschland seit 1961 / Marfa Heimbach. - Berlin: Schwarz, 2001
239. Wolgatataren im Deutschland des Zweiten Weltkriegs: deutsche Ostpolitik und tatarischer Nationalismus / Sebastian Cwiklinski'. Berlin: Schwarz, 2002
240. Der historische Roman Ägyptens: eine literaturwissenschaftliche Untersuchung am Beispiel der Mamlukenromane / Abier Bushnaq. - Berlin: Schwarz, 2002
241. Tendenzen und Entwicklungen in der modernen drusischen Gemeinschaft des Libanon: Versuche einer historischen, politischen und religiösen Standortbestimmung / Bernadette Schenk. - Berlin: Schwarz, 2002
242. Geistliche Autorität und islamische Gesellschaft im Wandel: Studien über Frauenälteste (otin und xalfa) im unabhängigen Usbekistan. Annette Krämer. Berlin Schwarz 2002
243. Die Berberbewegung in Marokko: zur Geschichte der Konstruktion einer ethnischen Identität (1912 - 1997) / Gabriele Kratochwil. - Berlin: Schwarz, 2002
244. Die Juden Hebrons von der Lokalgesellschaft zur "Nationalen Heimstätte" (1904 - 1938): die Desintegration einer peripheren jüdischen Gemeinde. Andreas Wagner. Berlin: Schwarz, 2002.
245. Abū l-Hudā aṣ-Ṣayyādī: eine Studie zur Instrumentalisierung sufischer Netzwerke und genealogischer Kontroversen im spätosmanischen Reich / Thomas Eich. - Berlin: Schwarz, 2003
246. Anerkennung des Iǧtihād - Legitimation der Toleranz: Möglichkeiten innerer und äußerer Toleranz im Islam am Beispiel der Iǧtihād-Diskussion / Abbas Poya. - Berlin: Schwarz, 2003
247. Zeitgenössische türkische Frauenliteratur: eine vergleichende Literaturanalyse ausgewählter Werke von Leylâ Erbil, Füruzan, Pınar Kür und Aysel Özakın / Mediha Göbenli. - Berlin: Schwarz, 2003
248. Islamische Fernsehsender in der Türkei: zur Entwicklung des türkischen Fernsehens zwischen Staat, Markt und Religion / Christine Jung. Berlin Schwarz 2003
249. The stories of the Prophets by Ibn Muṭarrif al-Ṭarafī / Ibn-Muṭarrif al-Ṭarafī. - Berlin: Schwarz, 2003
250. Der Herrscherwechsel im Mamlukensultanat: historische und historiographische Untersuchungen zu Abū Ḥāmid al-Qudsī und Ibn Taġrībirdī / Henning Sievert. Berlin: Klaus-Schwarz-Verlag GmbH, 2003
251. Palestinian Refugees in Lebanon - Where to belong? / Dorothee Klaus. 2003
252. Der Wille zur Macht: der fatimidische Wesir Yaʻqūb ibn Killis. Susanne Saker. Berlin Schwarz 2003
253. Mamlukische Sultansstiftungen des 9./15. Jahrhunderts: nach den Urkunden der Stifter al-Ašraf Īnāl und al-Mu'ayyad Aḥmad Ibn Īnāl / Lucian Reinfandt. - Berlin: Schwarz, 2003
254. Devout societies vs. impious states?: transmitting Islamic learning in Russia, Central Asia and China, through the Twentieth Century: proceedings of an international colloquium held in the Carré des Sciences, French Ministry of Research, Paris, November 12–13, 2001 / Stéphane A. Dudoignon. - Berlin: Schwarz, 2004
255. Muslim culture in Russia ... / Vol. 4 / Die Islamgelehrten Daghestans und ihre arabischen Werke: Naḏīr ad-Durgilīs (st. 1935) Nuzhat al-aḏhān fī tarāǧim ʿulamāʾ Dāġistān / Michael Kemper. - 2004
256. The European powers' plans regarding Jerusalem towards the middle of the 19th century / Yoram Shalit. Berlin: Klaus Schwarz, 2004
257. Elitenzirkulation in Transformationsgesellschaften: eine soziologische Fallstudie zur Zirkulation der Eliten im Iran. Afsaneh Gächter. Berlin: Klaus Schwarz, 2004
258. Transkription arabischer Schriften: Vorschläge für eine einheitliche Umschrift arabischer Bezeichnungen / Achim Schlott-Kotschote. - Berlin: Schwarz, 2004
259. Syrien nach dem Irak-Krieg: Bastion gegen Islamisten oder Staat vor dem Kollaps ? / Carsten Wieland. Berlin: K. Schwarz, 2004
260. Moral und Disziplin: Seyyed Ḥasan Taqīzāde und die Konstruktion eines "progressiven Selbst" in der frühen iranischen Moderne / Tim Epkenhans. Berlin Schwarz 2005
261. Die persische Volk im Wandel. Heinz-Georg Migeod. Berlin: K. Schwarz, cop. 2006
262. Frieden im Islam: die Instrumentalisierung des Islam im irakisch-iranischen Krieg / Majid S. Moslem. - Berlin: Schwarz, 2005
263. al-Ǧawbarī und sein Kašf al-asrār: ein Sittenbild des Gauners im arabisch-islamischen Mittelalter (7./13. Jahrhundert); Einführung, Edition und Kommentar / al- Ǧawbarī. - 1. Aufl. - Berlin: Schwarz, 2006
264. Der unermessliche Schatz, oder, die wirtschaftliche Lage Irans: Ǧamālzādes Studie zur iranischen Volkswirtschaft am Vorabend des Ersten Weltkrieges / Muḥammad ʻAlī Jamālzādah; Leila Nabieva. K. Schwarz, Berlin: ©2006
265. Die Beduinen in der Vorgeschichte Tunesiens: die "Invasion" der Banū Hilāl und ihre Folgen. Gerald Schuster. Berlin: K. Schwarz Verl., cop. 2006
266. Selbstbild und Weltsicht islamistischer Selbstmord-Attentäter tödliche Implikationen eines theozentrischen Menschenbildes unter selbstwertbedrohenden Bedingungen / Dawud Gholamasad. Berlin Schwarz 2006
267. Die sufische Koranauslegung: Semantik und Deutungsmechanismen der Ishari exegese / Hussein Ali Akash. Berlin: K. Schwarz, 2006.
268. By the soft lyres: the search for the prophet Elijah. Mishael Caspi; Gerda Neu-Sokol; Mohammad Jiyad. Berlin: Klaus Schwarz, ©2006
269. Salamon und Rabeka: Judenstereotype in Karikaturen der türkischen Zeitschriften "Akbaba", "Karikatür" und "Milli Inkilap", 1933-1945 / Hatice Bayraktar. Berlin: K. Schwarz, 2006
270. Die osmanischen Ulema des 17. Jahrhunderts: eine geschlossene Gesellschaft? / Denise Klein. Berlin: Klaus Schwarz, cop. 2007
271. Der Rifkrieg (1921)|Rif-Krieg 1921-1926: eine kritische Untersuchung des gesellschaftlichen Transformationsprozesses unter Muḥammad Ibn ʻAbd al-Karīm al Ḫaṭṭābī. Fouzia El-Asrouti. Berlin: Klaus Schwarz, ©2007
272. Ein osmanischer Almanach für das Jahr 1239/1240 (1824/1825) / Marlene Kurz. Berlin: Schwarz, 2007
273. Abbildung und Anpassung: das Türkenbild in safawidischen Chroniken des 16. Jahrhunderts / Tilmann Trausch. Berlin: Schwarz, 2008
274. Qurrat al-ʿAyn: eine Studie der religiösen und gesellschaftlichen Folgen ihres Wirkens / Soraya Adambakan. - Erstausg., 1. Aufl. - Berlin: Schwarz, 2008
275. Die Entwicklung des Osmanischen Reiches zwischen 1839 und 1908. Marcin Marcinkowski. Berlin: Schwarz, cop. 2007
276. Narrativität im Kitāb al-Faraǧ baʿda š-šidda des Abū ʿAli al-Muḥassin at-Tanūḫī: eine literaturwissenschaftliche Studie abbasidischer Prosa / Hakan Özkan. - Erstausg., 1. Aufl. - Berlin: Schwarz, c 2008
277. Muslime in Europa: Staatsbürgerschaft und Islam in einer liberalen und säkularen Demokratie / Ursi Schweizer. Berlin: K. Schwarz, cop. 2008
278. Das Bild Afghanistans im 20. Jahrhundert: das Werk des Schriftstellers und Diplomaten Ostād ʿAbdol Raḥmān Pažwāk (1919 - 1995) / Chaled Malekyar. - 1. Aufl., Erstausg. - Berlin: Schwarz, 2008
279. Scheich Muḥsin bin Zahrān al-ʻAbrī: tribale Macht im Oman des 19. Jahrhunderts / Michaela Hoffmann-Ruf. Klaus Schwarz c2008
280. Der Nativist Dschalāl Āl-e Ahmad|Ǧalāl-e Āl-e Aḥmad und die Verwestlichung Irans im 20. Jahrhundert: eine Analyse der ethnographischen Monographien Awrāzān, Tātnešīnhā-ye bolūk-e Zahrā und Ǧazīre-ye Ḫārg, dorr-e yatīm-e ḫalīg unter besonderer Berücksichtigung seiner Programmschrift Ġarbzadegī / Franz Lenze. Berlin: Schwarz, 2008
281. "We are here to stay": Pashtun migrants in the Northern Areas of Pakistan / Matthias Weinreich; photographs by Silvia Delogu. Klaus Schwarz c2009
282. "Allāh ist das Licht von Himmel und Erde": der Lichtvers Sura 24 an-Nūr 35; seine Bedeutung im Kontext der Offenbarung und Grundzüge seiner Auslegung in der islamischen Gelehrsamkeit / Ayşe Başol-Gürdal. - 1. Aufl. - Berlin: Schwarz, 2008
283. Celâl Esad Arseven: ein Leben zwischen Kunst, Politik und Wissenschaft / Dieter F Kickingereder. Berlin: Schwarz, ©2009.
284. I have a very good trust in my God: la construction de la religiosité des jeunes gens Sunnites à Beyrouth. Eva-Maria Zeis. Berlin: K. Schwarz, cop. 2009.
285. Müneccimbaşı als Historiker: arabische Historiographie bei einem osmanischen Universalgelehrten des 17. Jahrhunderts: Ǧami' ad-duwal (Teiledition 982/1574 - 1082/1672) / Müneccimbaşı; Hatice Arslan-Sözüdoǧru. Berlin: Schwarz Verlag, 2009.
286. Muslim cultures in the Indo-Iranian world during the early-modern and modern periods / Denis Hermann. - Erstausg., 1. Aufl. - Berlin: Schwarz, c 2010
287. Ein Mann spricht für die Frauen: aṭ-Ṭahir al-Haddād und seine Schrift "Die tunesische Frau in Gesetz und Gesellschaft" / Iman Hajji; al-Ṭāhir Ḥaddād. Berlin: Klaus Schwarz, ©2009
288. Sir Sayyid Ahmad Khan and the Muslim cause in British India / Belkacem Belmekki. - 1. Aufl. - Berlin: Schwarz, c 2010
289. Islamische Ökumene als Mittel der Politik: aktuelle Tendenzen in der Annäherungsdebatte zwischen Sunna und Schia auf der Doha-Konferenz 2007. Behnam Said. Berlin: K. Schwarz, ©2009
290. Von Ackerwinde bis Zypresse: das Pflanzenreich im "Königsbuch" des Ferdousï / Fatemeh Hamidifard-Graber. Berlin: Schwarz, 2009.
291. "Orientierungen": über die Entstehung europäischer Bilder vom Orient und von Arabien in der Antike; Einflussfaktoren und stereotype Fortführungen im Mittelalter / Uta Bellmann. - Erstausg., 2., durchges. Aufl. - Berlin: Schwarz, 2011
292. Die Daštakīs: die Familiengeschichte des Autors Ḥasan Fasāʹī im Fārsnāma-yi Nāṣirī / Elke Niewöhner. Berlin: Klaus Schwarz, ©2009.
293. "Zweideutige Individuen in schlechter Absicht": die antisemitischen Ausschreitungen in Ostmakedonien und Thrakien|Thrakien 1934 und ihre Hintergründe / Hatice Bayraktar. Berlin: Schwarz, 2011
294. Eine Biographie als politisches Mittel: Muḥammad ʿAbduh (1849 - 1905) und die Rebellion des Aḥmad ʿUrābī in der Rezeption Ṭāhir aṭ-Ṭanāḥīs (Muḏakkirāt al-Imām Muḥammad ʿAbduh) / Christopher Radler. - 1. Aufl. - Berlin: Schwarz, 2010
295. "Rassischer" Feind - politischer Freund?: Inszenierung und Instrumentalisierung des Araberbildes im nationalsozialistischen Deutschland / Sophie Wagenhofer. - Erstausg., 1. Aufl. - Berlin: Schwarz, 2010
296. Der mystische Pfad zu Gott: ʻUmar as-Suhrawardīs Schrift "Der versiegelte Wein" (ar-Raḥīq al-maḫtūm): Einleitung, Text und Übersetzung / ʻUmar Ibn Muḥammad as-Suhrawardī; Armin Eschraghi. Berlin: Klaus Schwarz Verlag, 2011
297. Zine el-Abidine Ben Ali|Ben Ali's "New Tunisia" (1987 - 2009): a case study of authoritarian modernization in the Arab world / Steffen Erdle. - Erstausg., 1. Aufl. - Berlin: Schwarz, 2010
298. Die südkaspischen Provinzen des Iran unter den Safawiden im 16. und 17. Jahrhundert: soziale und wirtschaftliche Verhältnisse / Yukako Goto. Berlin: Schwarz, 2011
299. Dawn for Islam in eastern Nigeria: a history of the arrival of Islam in Igboland / Egodi Uchendu. Berlin: K. Schwarz, cop. 2011
300. Nāyeb Ḥoseyn Kāšī - Straßenräuber oder Revolutionär?: eine Untersuchung zur neueren iranischen Geschichte; (1850 - 1920) / Abolhassan Hadjiheidari. Berlin: Schwarz, 2011
301. Gottes Wesen - Gottes Wirken: Ontologie und Kosmologie im Denken von Šams-al-Dīn Muḥammad al-Ḫafrī (gest. 942/1535): eine philosophische Analyse nach seinen Schriften "al-Risāla fī it̲bāt wāǧib al-wuǧūd bi-l-d̲āt wa-ṣifātihī" und "al-Risāla fī l-ilāhiyyāt". Firouzeh Saatchian; Šams ad-Dīn Muḥammad al-Ḫafrī. Berlin: Klaus Schwarz Verlag, 2011.
302. Die jüdische Gemeinde im Damaskus des 19. Jahrhunderts: städtische Sozialgeschichte und osmanische Gerichtsbarkeit im Spiegel islamischer und jüdischer Quellen / Christina Weber. - Erstausg., 1. Aufl. - Berlin: Klaus-Schwarz-Verl., 2011
303. Mit Gott und Frankreich: Bestimmungen Algeriens in Schriften des muslimischen Reformtheologen Ibn Badis zur Zeit der Volksfrontregierung (1936-1938) / Daniel Zakrzewski. 2012
304. Central Asian pilgrims: hajj routes and pious visits between Central Asia and the Hijaz; [proceedings of an international conference held in Tashkent] / Alexandre Papas. - 1. Aufl. - Berlin: Schwarz [u.a.], 2012 [erschienen] 2011
305. Palästinensische Märtyrerinnen: Selbstdarstellung und innerislamische Wahrnehmung weiblicher Selbstmordattentäter / Britt Ziolkowski. Berlin: Klaus Schwarz Verlag, ©2012
306. Zwei arabische Dialoge zur Alchemie: Die Unterredung des Aristoteles mit dem Inder Yūhīn und das Lehrgespräch der Alchemisten Qaydarūs und Mitāwus mit dem König Marqūnus. Edition, Übersetzung, Kommentar / Juliane Müller. 2012
307. Seafarers of the Seven Seas: The Maritime Culture in the Kitab 'Aja'ib al-Hind by Buzurg Ibn Shahriyar (d. 399/1009) / Suhanna Shafiq. 2013
308. Jurisdiktion als Mikrogeschichte.: Transkription, Übersetzung und Kommentierung von Auszügen aus dem Qādī|Kadiamtsregister 247 der Stadt Mardin um 1760. / Isabel Niemöller. Berlin: Klaus-Schwarz-Vlg 2012
309. Red Pomegranates: Love, Beauty, and Deceit: Arabic Poetry about, for, and by Women. Mishael M. Caspi / John T. Greene / Mohammad Jiyad (eds.).
310. Allah's Kolkhozes Migration, De-Stalinisation, Privatisation and the New Muslim Congregations in the Soviet Realm (1950s-2000s) Stéphane A. Dudoignon / Christian Noack (eds.) - 2014
311. Die Rezepte der Freiburger alchemistischen Handschrift des Abd al-Gabbar al-Hamadani Edition, Übersetzung und Kommentar Georg Leube - 2013
312. Family Portraits with Saints Hagiography, Sanctity, and Family in the Muslim World Catherine Mayeur-Jaouen / Alexandre Papas (eds.) - 2013
313. A Life in Parables and Poetry: Mishael Maswari Caspi Essays in Memory of a Pedagogue, Poet, and Scholar John T. Greene (ed.) - 2014
314. Pogrom in Istanbul, 6./7. September 1955 Die Rolle der türkischen Presse in einer kollektiven Plünderungs- und Vernichtungshysterie Ulkü Ağır - 2014
315. Moderne, Subjekt, Staat Zur Rolle der Bildung in der Kontroverse zwischen Individuum und Staat im Iran Parvin Javadi - 2014
316. Religious Communities and Modern Statehood The Ottoman and post-Ottoman World at the Age of Nationalism and Colonialism Michalis N. Michael, Tassos Anastassiadis, Chantal Verdeil (eds.) - 2015
317. British Policy and the Nationalist Movement in Egypt, 1914-1924 A Political Study Majid Salman Hussain - 2015
318. Feuerfunken im Orient 1914 –1916 Arabisch-osmanische Offiziere und haschimitische Aristokraten vor dem Großen Arabischen Aufstand Jasmina Jäckel de Aldana - 2015
319. Die ersten 11 Suren des Koran Übersetzt von Johann Gottfried Wetzstein, erster preußischer Konsul in Damaskus 1849-1861 Ingeborg Huhn / Hars Kurio (Hg.) - 2015
320. His Majesty's Consul in Saloniki Charles Blunt (1800-1864), ein europäischer Konsul als Agent der Modernisierung in der osmanischen Provinz Gülay Tulasoglu - 2015
321. Ein traditionalistischer Korandeuter im Dienste des Kemalismus Elmalılı Muhammed Hamdi Yazır (1878–1942) Benjamin Flöhr - 2015
322. Das Kitāb Sidrat al-muntahā des Pseudo-Ibn Waḥšīya Einleitung, Edition und Übersetzung eines hermetisch-allegorischen Traktats zur Alchemie Christopher Braun - 2016
323. Irans Führungsanspruch (1979–2013) Mission, Anhängerschaft und islamistische Konzepte im Diskurs der Politik-Elite Oliver Borszik - 2016
324. Pers-Andalus: iranische Kulturdenkmäler in "al-Andalus al-aqṣā" : Bewertung der Forschungsergebnisse für das 8.-12. Jahrhundert Gabriele Dold-Ghadar - 2016
325. Maritime terminology of the Saudi Arabian Red Sea coast: a lexical semantic study Muhammad Zafer Alhazmi - 2016
