= Tulunids =

Mamluk dynasty in Egypt and Syria (868–905)

Tulunid Emirate الإِمَارَةُ الطُّولُونِيَّة (ar)
- 868–905
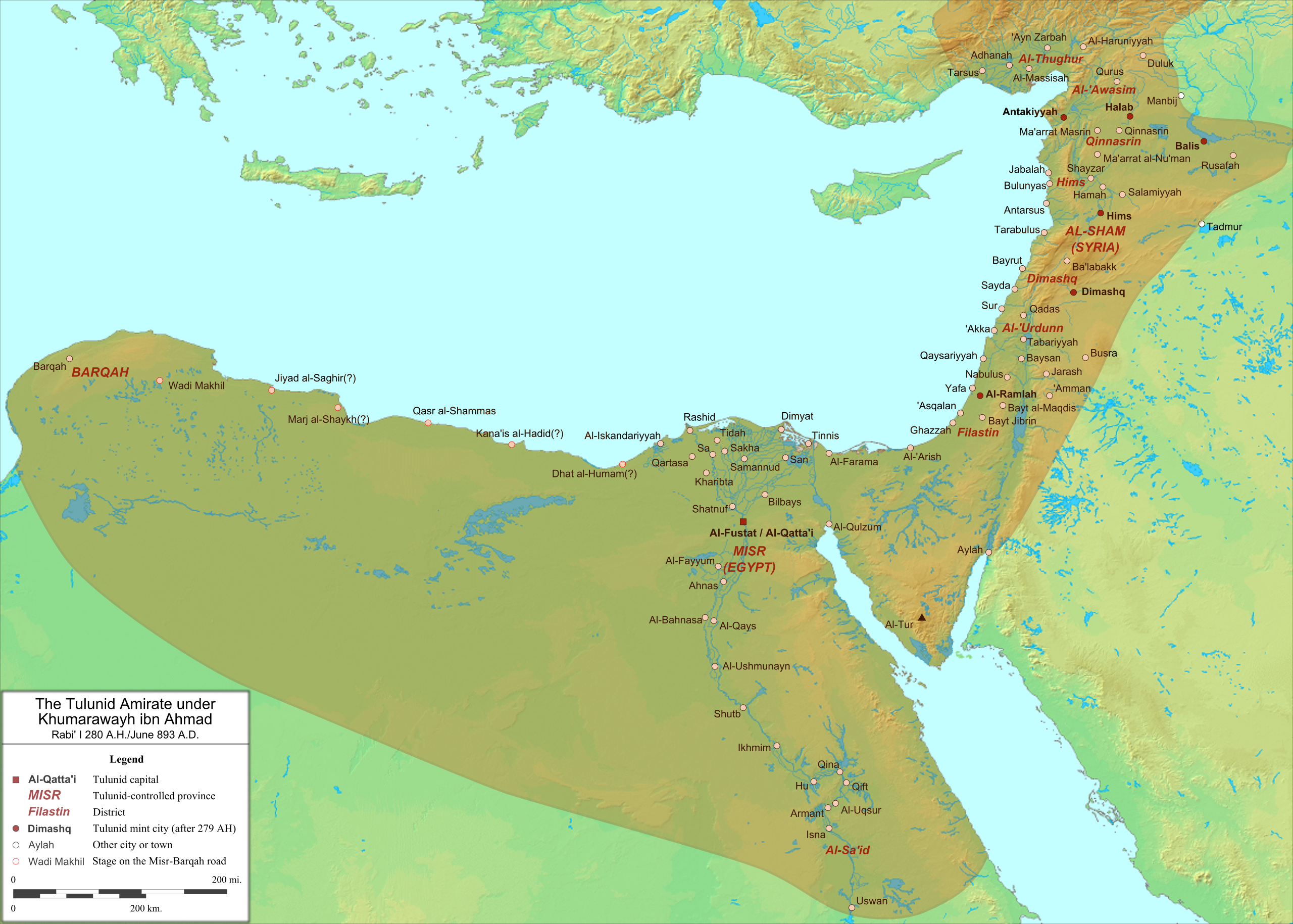
- Tulunid Emirate in 893.
- Status: Vassal of the Abbasid Caliphate
- Capital: Al-Qata'i
- Official languages: Arabic
- Religion: Sunni Islam, Twelver Shi'ism, Christianity, Judaism (minority)
- Government: De jure caliphal Governorate Emirate; De facto Autonomous Emirate from Caliphate
- Emir
  - 868–884 (first): Aḥmad ibn Ṭūlūn
  - 904–905 (last): Shayban ibn Ahmad ibn Tulun
- History
  - Established: 868
  - Abbasid reconquest: 905
- Currency: Dinar
Preceded by	Succeeded by
Abbasid Caliphate	Abbasid Caliphate; Ikhshidid dynasty
- Today part of: Egypt, Libya, Palestine, Israel, Jordan, Lebanon, Syria, Turkey

The Tulunids (Arabic: الطولونيون) were a Mamluk dynasty of Turkic origin who ruled Egypt on behalf of the Abbasid Caliphate. They were autonomous from 868 until 905, when the Abbasids restored the Tulunid domains to their control.

The Tulunid state emerged during a period marked by the growing power of the Turkic military within the Abbasid Caliphate. This was a time when the Turkic guard exerted control over the empire's affairs, and when ethnic Shu'ubiyya and separatist tendencies began to emerge among the various peoples and governors of the vast Abbasid territories. The establishment of the Tulunid state was one of the inevitable outcomes of this growing sentiment. In the late 9th century, internal conflict amongst the Abbasids made control of the outlying areas of the empire increasingly tenuous, and in 868 the Turkic officer Ahmad ibn Tulun was sent to Egypt. He subsequently achieved nominal autonomy from the central Abbasid government. During his reign (868–884) and those of his successors, the Tulunid domains were expanded to include Jordan Rift Valley, as well as Hejaz, Cyprus and Crete. Ahmad was succeeded by his son Khumarawayh, whose military and diplomatic achievements made him a major player in the Middle Eastern political stage. The Abbasids affirmed their recognition of the Tulunids as legitimate rulers, and the dynasty's status as vassals to the caliphate. After Khumarawayh's death, his successor emirs were ineffectual rulers, allowing their Turkic and black slave-soldiers to run the affairs of the state. In 905, the Tulunids were unable to resist an invasion by the Abbasid troops, who restored direct caliphal rule in Syria and Egypt.

The Tulunid period was marked by economic and administrative reforms alongside cultural ones. Ahmad ibn Tulun changed the taxation system and aligned himself with the merchant community. He also established the Tulunid army. The capital was moved from Fustat to al-Qata'i, where the celebrated mosque of Ibn Tulun was constructed.

== Background ==
=== Emergence of Shu'ubiyya in the Abbasid state ===
Shu'ubiyya tendency is characterized by a preference for non-Arab "Ajam" over Arab "tribes". The etymology of this term can be traced back to an interpretation of a Quranic verse: "and made you peoples and tribes that you may know one another." (Quran 49:13). Some interpreters have proposed that the term "peoples" in this context may be understood to refer to "civilized peoples". This inclination first manifested during the Abbasid Caliphate, emerging as a consequence of several factors, most notably the ethnic diversity that characterized the vast Abbasid state and the appointment of non-Arabs to positions within the courts and administrative apparatus of the Abbasid caliphs.

In establishing their rule, the Abbasids relied on the Persians, who held resentment towards the Umayyads. This was in contrast to the Umayyads, who relied on Arab elements to manage their state and lead their armies. In return for their support, the early Abbasid caliphs rewarded their Persian allies by appointing them to ministerial and military leadership roles. However, these caliphs soon came to recognize that the influence of Persian ministers had surpassed their own, leading them to eliminate them. For example, Abū Jaʿfar al-Manṣūr killed his minister Abu Muslim al-Khurasani, and Harun al-Rashid executed his minister Jaʽfar ibn Yahya Barmaki and persecuted his family. This political struggle between Persians and Arabs at the dawn of the Abbasid era gave rise to the Shu'ubiyya movement, which sought to elevate non-Arab peoples above Arabs. This movement asserted that these peoples were superior in terms of civilization, literature, and poetry. A lengthy debate ensued between the two sides, with each faction being represented by its poets, writers, and politicians. This schism among the population of the state eventually resulted in the emergence of the inaugural separatist movements against the Abbasid Caliphate, spearheaded by the military commander Tahir ibn Husayn, who established the Tahirid dynasty in Khorasan in 821 CE.

The internal factors that encouraged the spread of separatist movements included the vast expanse of the Abbasid Caliphate, which had grown into an empire stretching across the region from the borders of China to the central Maghreb in North Africa. However, this vastness, rather than providing a source of strength for the state, became a source of weakness, contributing to its disintegration and fragmentation. The considerable distance between the various parts of the empire and its capital, coupled with the inherent difficulties of communication in that era, permitted governors in distant provinces to exceed the limits of their authority and govern their regions independently, without concern for the armies dispatched from the capital to suppress their separatist movements, which often arrived too late to be of any consequence. The weakness of the caliphs further exacerbated these issues, enabling them to fester and weaken the state. The governors exploited this weakness, with some even residing in Baghdad and sending deputies to manage their provinces. These deputies, in turn, began seeking independence for their regions, transforming their positions into hereditary roles passed down to their sons. As a result, small states emerged that were only nominally connected to the Abbasid Caliphate.

=== Turkic troops in the Abbasid state apparatus ===
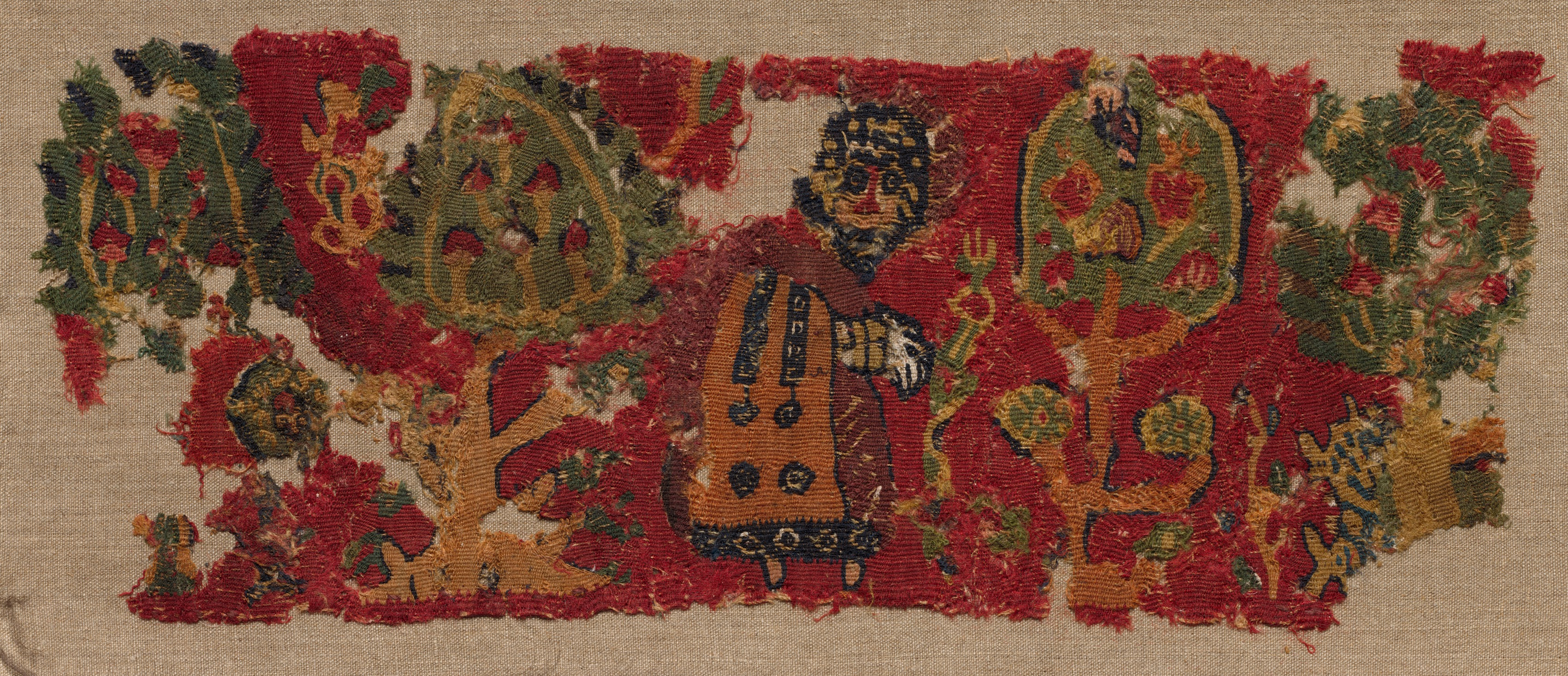
Fragment, probably a border from the hem of a tunic. Egypt, late Abbasid or Tulunid period, 9th Century. Cleveland Museum of Art.

The Umayyads were the first to bring Turkic peoples from their lands after their conversion to Islam, employing them in their armies and state apparatus. Following the collapse of the Umayyad Caliphate and the ascendance of the Abbasid Caliphate, which was consolidated under the leadership of Abu Ja'far al-Mansur, several Turkic individuals began to assume prominent roles within the Abbasid court, as their numbers increased. The Abbasid caliphs of the early Abbasid era employed them in their palaces, entrusted them with confidential information, and assigned them the responsibility of ensuring their safety. Abu Ja'far al-Mansur was the first Abbasid caliph to integrate the Turks as intimate associates and officials, placing his confidence in Hamad al-Turki, who subsequently became one of his most trusted confidants and aides. Such was the extent of his trust in him that he entrusted him alone with the state's records, carrying the key to the records in his sleeve.

Al-Mansur eschewed the employment of Arabs in his palaces, refusing to allow any Arab to serve in his court or harem. Instead, he favored other groups, such as the Turks. He was the first to appoint them as chamberlains, selecting Hamad al-Turki as his chamberlain after the state was firmly established, and also appointing him as governor of the Sawad region. Abū Abd Allāh al-Mahdī also employed several Turks in his palaces, including Shakir al-Turki, a military leader in Fars, and Faraj al-Khadim, who subsequently became prominent during the reign of Harun al-Rashid. Additionally, he appointed Yahya ibn Sa'id al-Harashi as governor of Egypt in 778 CE.

The Turkic soldiers played a significant role during al-Mahdi's reign, notably in suppressing the Kharijites when they rebelled under Abdul Salam al-Yashkuri in 776 CE in Bajarma. Harun al-Rashid further expanded the use of Turks in his palaces, departments, and army, with Abu Salim Faraj al-Khadim al-Turki becoming one of his military leaders. In 786 CE, al-Rashid appointed Abu Salim Faraj al-Khadim al-Turki to oversee the reconstruction and completion of the city of Tarsus. Another prominent Turkic aide was Masrour the servant, who was one of the closest individuals to Harun al-Rashid and whom the caliph trusted immensely. Masrur was assigned the task of eliminating Ja'far ibn Yahya al-Barmaki, a prominent figure in the Abbasid court and a close associate of the caliph. He carried out this mission with precision and success. Harun al-Rashid's entourage included numerous Turkic, and he employed an odalisque from Fergana and Osrushana, some of whom became favorites. One such example is Maridah bint Shabib, the mother of al-Mu'tasim, a Turkic woman who held a special place with the caliph.

Similarly, Abu Ja'far Abdullah al-Ma'mun also employed Turks in his palaces and armies, recruiting them from Transoxiana following their conversion to Islam. Their delegations were numerous and frequent, and he was renowned for his magnanimity towards the Turkic rulers who visited him. Some of these Turks attained prominent positions of authority, such as Tulun, the father of Ahmad, who was the founder of the Tulunid state, and Kha'us, who was appointed by al-Ma'mun as governor of Osrushana. His son, Khaydhar ibn Kawus al-Afshin, became one of al-Ma'mun's most prominent military commanders and played a pivotal role in suppressing numerous rebellions. Upon al-Mu'tasim's ascension to the caliphate, the conflict between Arabs and Persians, who had gained favor during the early years of al-Ma'mun's rule, had intensified, disrupting the balance between the various factions within the Abbasid state. This resulted in the emergence of Persian-backed movements opposing the state, which led al-Mu'tasim to lose trust in the Persians.

Conversely, al-Mu'tasim did not place his trust in the Arabs, nor did he rely on them as a source of support. This was because they had a history of rebellions and unrest against the caliphs. Furthermore, they had forfeited a considerable portion of their political and military influence, thereby reducing their capacity to pose a significant threat and diminishing their importance. These circumstances prompted al-Mu'tasim to place his security in the hands of a unit of Turkic soldiers, whose psychological and physical attributes were deemed to be well-suited to their role. This Turkic element subsequently exerted considerable influence on the political and social fabric of the caliphate, becoming a pivotal element during Al-Mu'tasim's tenure. To ensure the stability of his rule and the continued existence of the caliphate in the context of the Arab-Persian conflict, al-Mu'tasim employed the Turks extensively in his army, placing them under the command of Turkic leaders. This action had a significant impact on the Arab commanders and soldiers, as well as on the traditional policy of Abu Ja'far al-Mansur, which aimed to maintain a balance in the army between Arab and non-Arab factions. Al-Mu'tasim resettled the Turks in the city of Samarra, which he had specifically constructed for them.

=== Increased Turkic influence and its impact on the caliphate ===
The capital of the Abbasid caliphate was moved to Samarra, which served as the seat of the Abbasid state for almost fifty years and became the center of the new Turkic dominance. From the time of al-Mu'tasim, prominent Turkic figures began to emerge on the political scene and play a significant role in public life. Among them were al-Afshin, Ashinas, Itakh, Wasif, and Sima al-Dimashqi, who served the state and supported it in its internal wars against various insurgent movements in its territories, as well as in its external wars against the Byzantine Empire. Over time, these Turks began to seek their power base, either within the Caliphate or independently, as some of them began to aspire to control the affairs of the capital, realizing that the Caliphate could not function without their services. The caliphate of Abū Jaʿfar al-Wathiq marked a transitional period between two eras: the first was the period of Turkic control over the affairs of the state while maintaining the prestige of the caliphate, and the second was the period of Turkic dominance coupled with the decline of the prestige of the caliphate and the diminishing status of the caliphs.

During al-Wathiq's reign, the Turks consolidated their power and their leaders gained significant influence, to the point that the caliph had to grant Ashnas the title of 'Sultan', recognizing his authority beyond mere military duties. Ashnas became the first person to be granted the title of Sultan by a Caliph and was entrusted with the administration of the Upper Mesopotamia, Syria, and Egypt. Similarly, Itakh was appointed governor of Khorasan, Sindh, and the districts along the Tigris. As a result of this expansion of authority, the Turks' influence grew both inside and outside Iraq, enabling them to dominate the Abbasid court and effectively control all of its provinces.

The Turks then took another significant step by asserting control over the caliph himself, thereby ensuring the continuity of their power. They monitored his movements and participated in political discussions. To maintain this control, they did not proceed directly to their appointed provinces; instead, they delegated deputies to manage them. This strategy constituted a pivotal stage in the eventual disintegration of the centralized authority, as the deputies strove for autonomy, capitalizing on the frailty of the central power and the caliph's lack of awareness of the circumstances prevailing in the provinces. They relied on the Turks they had appointed. To consolidate their control over the caliphate, the Turks began to interfere in the selection and appointment of caliphs. Al-Wathiq was the final caliph to be appointed by the traditional methods. Upon his death, without designating his young son Muhammad as his successor, a power struggle ensued between two principal factions concerning the selection of the subsequent caliph. The first faction comprised high-ranking state officials, including members of the Abbasid family, the vizier Muhammad ibn al-Zayyat, and the Chief Judge Ahmad ibn Abi Du'ad, who expressed support for the candidacy of Muhammad ibn al-Wathiq. The second faction was the ascendant Turkic power, which nominated Ja'far ibn al-Mutawakkil and successfully imposed him as caliph under the title "al-Mutawakkil 'ala Allah."

This event set a dangerous precedent for the selection of future caliphs, as the Turkic commanders became the true power brokers, with no caliph being appointed without their approval. They elevated the man they favored and dismissed those they did not, thus tightening their control over the affairs of the caliphate and governing it according to their own will.

Al-Mutawakkil, and subsequently his son al-Muntasir, were aware of the detrimental impact of Turkic influence on the caliphate and the growing disregard for the caliph's authority. Both attempted to curtail the Turks' power and limit their influence. However, the Turks, perceiving an imminent threat to their position, acted expeditiously to eliminate both caliphs, resulting in their deaths. Consequently, the Turks became the uncontested masters of the caliphate's capital, with no opposition capable of challenging their dominance.

=== Egypt's internal conditions prior to the Tulunids ===
The Alid movement in Egypt gained significant traction during the reign of Abu Ja'far al-Mansur (136-158 AH / 753-775 CE) and persisted throughout the early Abbasid period. The persecution of the Alids by the Abbasids in the eastern Islamic regions compelled numerous Alids to seek refuge in distant locales, including Egypt, beyond the reach of the Abbasid capital. The fundamental cause of the profound schism between the Alids and the Abbasids was the Shi'ite' conviction that the Abbasids, like the Umayyads who had preceded them, had unlawfully assumed control of the caliphate. Despite the Abbasids' lineage tracing back to the Islamic prophet Muhammad (Ahl al-Bayt), the Alids regarded themselves as the rightful heirs to the caliphate.

It seems that following the rule of Abu Ja'far al-Mansur, the subsequent Abbasid caliphs did not actively persecute the Alids in Egypt. This may have been due to the relative calmness of the Shi'ites or to the Abbasids' attempts to gain their support. This remained the case until al-Mutawakkil assumed the role of caliph. Al-Mutawakkil, who harbored a deep animosity towards the Alid party, issued an order to the governor of Egypt, Ishaq ibn Yahya, commanding the expulsion of the descendants of Ali ibn Abi Talib from Egypt. As a result, in Rajab 236 AH (January 851 CE), the Shi'ites were expelled from Fustat and relocated to Iraq, and subsequently exiled to Medina. Those who remained in Egypt were compelled to go into hiding, as their safety was no longer assured. Al-Mutawakkil's successor, Yazid ibn Abdullah, further intensified the repression of the Alids, forcibly deporting a significant number of them to Iraq under inhumane conditions.

Yazid ibn Abdullah was retained as governor of Egypt by the caliph al-Muntasir, who issued orders regarding the Shi'a that were characterized by strictness. He enacted a decree that no Shi'ite was permitted to possess property, ride a horse, or travel beyond the limits of Fustat. Furthermore, they were permitted to possess only one slave, and in the event of an Alid being involved in a legal dispute, the testimony of their opponent was deemed sufficient without the necessity for additional evidence.

The situation in Egypt became increasingly unstable following the deposition of Caliph Abū al-ʿAbbās Aḥmad al-Musta in Muharram 252 AH (December 856 CE) and the subsequent enthronement of al-Mu'tazz. The prevailing unrest in Baghdad presented a window of opportunity for ambitious individuals to challenge the prevailing Abbasid rule. In Rabi' al-Akhir 252 AH (March 866 CE), Jaber ibn al-Walid al-Mudlaji instigated a rebellion in Alexandria, amassing considerable strength and extending his influence over a substantial portion of the Delta region, where he levied taxes. The governor of Egypt, Yazid ibn Abdullah, was unable to suppress the rebellion, which prompted Caliph al-Mu'tazz to send a military force under the command of Muzahim ibn Khakan. Muzahim was successful in suppressing the rebellion and capturing Jaber. As a result, the caliph appointed Muzahim as governor of Egypt in Rabi' al-Awwal 253 AH (March 867 CE), replacing Yazid ibn Abdullah.

Alid uprisings in Egypt persisted from the time of Caliph al-Mutawakkil, to overthrow Abbasid rule and establish a Shi'ite state in the region. These rebellions were encouraged by the pervasive unrest in the eastern Islamic world, particularly in Baghdad, where a power struggle existed between the caliphate and the Turkic military factions. This state of affairs persisted until the arrival of Ahmad ibn Tulun in Egypt, who established his autonomous emirate.

== History ==
The rise and fall of the Tulunids occurred against a backdrop of increasing regionalism in the Muslim world. The Abbasid caliphate was struggling with political disturbances and losing its aura of universal legitimacy. There had previously been Coptic and Shia Alid-led movements in Egypt and Baghdad, without more than temporary and local success. There was also a struggle for power between the Turkic military command and the administration of Baghdad. Furthermore, there was a widening imperial financial crisis. All of these themes would recur during the Tulunid rule.

The internal politics of the Abbasid caliphate itself seem to have been unstable. In 870, Abū Aḥmad (b. al-Mutawakkil) al-Muwaffaq (d. 891) was summoned from exile in Mecca to re-establish Abbasid authority over southern Iraq. Quickly, however, he became the de facto ruler of the caliphate. As a result of this uncertainty, Ahmad ibn Tulun could establish and expand his authority. Thus the Tulunids wielded regional power, largely unhindered by imperial will; as such, the Tulunids can be compared with other 9th-century dynasties of the Muslim world, including the Aghlabids and the Tahirids.

=== Ahmad ibn Tulun ===
The roots of Ahmad ibn Tulun can be traced back to the Turkic tribe of the Tughuzghuz, and in particular to a family based in Bukhara. His father, Tulun, who the state Ahmad subsequently founded was named after, was a Mamluk who was brought to Nuh ibn Asad, the governor of Bukhara and Khurasan. Subsequently, Nuh dispatched him as a gift to the Abbasid Caliph al-Ma'mun, accompanied by other Turkic Mamluks, in the year 200 AH (816 CE). The Caliph al-Ma'mun was greatly impressed by this Turkic mamluk, who displayed indications of nobility and loyalty. Consequently, Tulun acquired the Caliph's favor, and his status was elevated, resulting in his appointment to several positions which he subsequently managed with considerable success. He was subsequently appointed as the head of the guard and was bestowed with the title "Amir al-Sitr" (Commander of the Veil). He held this prominent position for a period of twenty years.

Tulun had several children, among them Ahmad, who was known by the kunya (Arabic nickname) Abu al-Abbas. Ahmad was born on 23 Ramadan 220 AH (22 August 835 CE) in Baghdad to a concubine named Qasim. He was raised under his father's care, which set him apart from his contemporaries, the children of other non-Arabs. He made a conscious effort to avoid the corrupt and immoral behavior common among the Turkic elite. Among his acquaintances, he was known for his piety and righteousness, as well as his strength, courage, and military prowess, which were the result of his upbringing.

At that time, there was a pressing need for a young officer to serve in the frontier city of Tarsus. The ideal candidate would have been a brave individual willing to confront the enemy and engage in jihad, while also demonstrating the piety befitting the devout atmosphere that prevailed in the city. Tarsus was of great strategic and military importance, situated as it was on the border between Muslim lands and Byzantine territories. Concurrently, Ahmad ibn Tulun had petitioned the minister Ubayd Allah ibn Yahya for the allotment of his stipend in the aforementioned frontier, articulating his aspiration to take up residence there. The minister acceded to his request.

Consequently, Ahmad ibn Tulun relocated to Tarsus, where he spent his formative years, distant from the Turkic environment of Iraq. He engaged in the study of religious knowledge, hadith, and literature under the tutelage of distinguished scholars in Tarsus, entered into matrimony, and begot offspring. He participated in the summer raids (ṣawā'if) against the Byzantines and became acquainted with Syria, recognizing its strategic significance. His formative years in Tarsus likely fostered his aspiration to govern both Syria and Egypt.

Ahmad ibn Tulun's initial foray into the public consciousness commenced following the demise of his father in 240 AH (854 CE) when he was just twenty years of age. The Abbasid caliph al-Mutawakkil appointed him to the military duties previously held by his father. Consequently, Ahmad was swiftly elevated to command the frontiers, Damascus, and the territories of Egypt. In this manner, Ahmad ibn Tulun commenced his involvement in the tumultuous political landscape of Iraq, garnering the esteem and confidence of the Turkic elite and the Abbasid Caliphate. His relationship with both Caliph al-Mutawakkil and Caliph al-Musta'in was characterized by a high degree of mutual respect and trust. His connection with the latter commenced upon his return from Tarsus, where he had been residing, and his subsequent joining of a caravan from Byzantium that was transporting Roman merchandise for the Caliph. Ahmad ibn Tulun saved the caravan from Bedouin highwaymen in the region of Urfa. In gratitude for his actions, the Caliph rewarded him with a thousand dinars.

In contrast to numerous Turkic guard commanders, Ahmad ibn Tulun demonstrated a profound respect and reverence for the Caliph, both in his presence and in discourse. Following the exile of Caliph al-Musta'in to Wasit due to his conflict with al-Mu'tazz and the Turks, the latter permitted Ahmad to accompany him, thereby becoming his companion in captivity. This decision, and the Turks' acceptance of Ahmad as the Caliph's companion, was likely the result of the trust he had established with all parties. Ahmad ibn Tulun demonstrated his reliability by treating Caliph al-Musta'in with respect and refusing to comply with a request from Qabiha, the mother of al-Mu'tazz, to assassinate him in exchange for the governorship of Wasit. Ahmad's response was unequivocal: "I will never resort to the act of killing a Caliph with whom I have pledged my allegiance and taken solemn oaths." He facilitated the safe delivery of the Caliph to his adversaries, fully cognizant of the inevitable outcome that awaited him.

Ahmad ibn Tulun's stance greatly impressed the Turks, who admired his piety and wisdom, thereby elevating him in their eyes. As a consequence, the young man was regarded as a potential leader, and he gained significant esteem among the people of Baghdad.

=== Ibn Tulun's rise to power in Egypt ===
Baykbak al-Turki subsequently became a prominent political figure in the wake of the conflict that resulted in the assassination of Caliph al-Musta'in and the ascension of al-Mu'tazz. As one of the principal Turkic commanders who instigated this conflict, Baykbak and his fellow leaders apportioned the various provinces and responsibilities among themselves. Al-Mu'tazz bestowed upon Baykbak the authority to oversee Egypt and its adjacent territories. Nevertheless, Baykbak was reluctant to depart from the capital of the caliphate, presumably apprehending that his absence might result in his deposition from power. He thus elected to remain near the seat of authority and to actively engage in the decision-making process, appointing Ahmad ibn Tulun as his deputy in Egypt. Ahmad ibn Tulun was selected for this position due to his reputation for effective governance and his familial connection to Baykbak, being the husband of his mother. Ahmad ibn Muhammad al-Wasiti accompanied Ahmad ibn Tulun on his journey to Egypt, entering the country on Wednesday, 23 Ramadan 254 AH (September 15, 868 CE). At that time, the prevailing policy was to appoint multiple officials to govern Egypt, thereby ensuring that they would monitor each other. Ahmad ibn Muhammad ibn al-Mudabbir was responsible for the administration of taxes, but he was notorious for his harshness and cruelty, which earned him a bad reputation among the Egyptian population. He was a shrewd and Machiavellian bureaucrat. Servant of Qabiha, the mother of al-Mu'tazz, Shuqayr al-Khadim was responsible for the administration of the postal service.

In this capacity, he was charged with monitoring the activities of senior officials and reporting their conduct to the caliphate. Shuqayr frequently engaged in actions that resulted in the fracturing of alliances between the various powers. Bakkar ibn Qutayba served as the chief judge, Ishaq ibn Dinar governed Alexandria, and Ahmad ibn Isa al-Sa'idi was in charge of Barqa. Upon his arrival in Fustat, Ahmad ibn Tulun swiftly encountered a series of competing interests and power structures. The relationship between Ibn al-Mudabbir and Ibn Tulun subsequently deteriorated following an attempt by the latter to gain his support through the presentation of a gift comprising ten thousand dinars, which was ultimately declined by Ibn Tulun. Ahmad ibn Tulun had entered Egypt with grand ambitions that surpassed mere financial gain. Recognizing the ambitious nature of Ibn Tulun, Ibn al-Mudabbir perceived him as a potential threat. He initiated a plot to remove him from Egypt. Ibn al-Mudabbir sent a report to the caliphate, asserting that Ahmad ibn Tulun was untrustworthy to govern Egypt or any other region and accusing him of intending to declare independence in Egypt.

Ahmad ibn Tulun responded to the conspiracy initiated by Ibn al-Mudabbir by securing the backing of prominent merchants in both Egypt and Iraq. He leveraged their influence to influence the authorities in Baghdad through financial incentives, thereby successfully securing his position as the ruler of Egypt despite the numerous accusations and complaints sent by Ibn al-Mudabbir and Shuqayr al-Hajib. This strategy, in conjunction with the support of pivotal Turkic commanders such as Baykbak and Yarjukh, who held considerable influence within the caliphate, reinforced his authority.

Furthermore, Ahmad ibn Tulun was able to gain the support of the vizier, al-Hasan ibn Makhlad, through the provision of financial incentives. This resulted in the vizier sending Ahmad the letters that had been written by Ibn al-Mudabbir and Shuqayr al-Hajib, which were previously kept secret. This enabled Ahmad ibn Tulun to identify his opponents and comprehend their genuine objectives. Consequently, he resolved to eradicate them to purify the political landscape. He summoned Shuqayr al-Hajib and detained him, which proved a significant shock to Shuqayr, resulting in his subsequent demise.

Subsequently, Ahmad ibn Tulun directed his attention towards the removal of Ibn al-Mudabbir, who constituted a considerable threat to his aspirations in Egypt. He wrote to Caliph al-Muhtadi, requesting the dismissal of Ibn al-Mudabbir from his role as overseer of Egypt's tax collection and the appointment of Muhammad ibn Hilal, a close ally of Ahmad, in his stead. Given that Baykbak held sway over the caliphate at the time, the caliph acquiesced to Ahmad's request.

The political developments in Baghdad served to reinforce the position of Ahmad ibn Tulun in Egypt. Baykbak was assassinated in 256 AH (870 CE), and his successor, the Turkic commander Yarjukh, who was also Ahmad ibn Tulun's father-in-law, wrote to him, stating, "Take charge of what is rightfully yours." This was an unambiguous indication that Ahmad ibn Tulun was to assume control of the entire Egyptian administration, although the collection of taxes remained subject to the limited authority of Ibn al-Mudabbir, who found his influence progressively eroded.

Ahmad ibn Tulun proceeded to consolidate his power in Egypt, leading a military force to Alexandria, where he appointed Tughluk as governor of Fustat and Takhshi ibn Yalbarda as chief of police. Upon his arrival in Alexandria during the month of Ramadan in 257 AH (June 871 CE), the city's governor, Ishaq ibn Dinar, extended a warm welcome to him, and Ahmad duly confirmed his governorship. He also proceeded to assume control of Barqa from Ahmad ibn Isa al-Sa'idi, a move that served to further enhance his stature and deepen Ibn al-Mudabbir's anxiety and distress. This marked the beginning of a new era in Egyptian history.

In the year 259 AH (873 CE), Yarjukh, who had been the de facto ruler of Egypt's territories that Ahmad ibn Tulun governed on his behalf, died. Subsequently, Caliph al-Mu'tamid formally designated Ahmad ibn Tulun as the governor of Egypt, thereby acknowledging him as the rightful sovereign on behalf of the caliphate. This year is regarded as the foundation year of the Tulunid Emirate.

Ibn Tulun promptly established a financial and military presence in the province of Egypt by establishing an independent Egyptian army and taking over the management of the Egyptian and Syrian treasuries. In 877, troops of the caliphate were sent against him, due to his insufficient payment of tribute. Ahmad ibn Tulun, however, maintained his power, and took Syria the following year.

In 263 AH (877 CE), Ahmad ibn Tulun received a missive from al-Mu'tamid requesting the transfer of the Egyptian tax revenues. Ahmad responded that he was unable to comply, citing the fact that the revenue was in the hands of another. In response, al-Mu'tamid granted Ahmad ibn Tulun control over the tax revenue and appointed him as the governor of the Syrian frontier regions, following unrest there. Consequently, Ahmad ibn Tulun became the undisputed ruler of all of Egypt and the overseer of all its military, administrative, judicial, and financial affairs. Furthermore, he minted the Ahmadid dinar as a symbol of this newfound independence.

Ibn Tulun's reign of more than ten years allowed him to leave behind a well-trained military, a stable economy and an experienced bureaucracy to oversee the state affairs. He appointed his son, Khumārawayh, as heir.

With full autonomy, once the tax income no longer had to go to the Caliph in Baghdad, it was possible to develop irrigation works and build a navy, which greatly stimulated the local economy and trade. In 878, the Jordan valley was occupied by the Tulunids, extending in the north to the outposts in the Anti-Lebanon mountains on the Byzantine border, enabling them to defend Egypt against Abbasid attack.

=== Opposition against Ibn Tulun ===
At the outset of his political career, Ahmad ibn Tulun was confronted with a series of revolutionary movements, the majority of which were shaped by religious and sectarian tensions, reflecting the prevailing conflicts of the era. Confronting these uprisings served multiple purposes, including the establishment of internal security, demonstration of loyalty to the Abbasid dynasty, defense of the Abbasid Caliphate, and consolidation of his position as a powerful governor.

One such challenge arose when the commander Bugha al-Kabir, having fled Baghdad, took up residence in the region between Cyrenaica and Alexandria, proclaiming himself a rebel in 869 CE (255 AH). He claimed descent from Ali to attract followers, adopting the name Ahmad ibn Muhammad ibn Ibrahim ibn Tabataba. He subsequently proceeded to Upper Egypt, where his following expanded, and he proclaimed himself Caliph. Ahmad ibn Tulun responded to this challenge to his authority by dispatching his commander Bahm ibn al-Husayn, who engaged in combat with and ultimately killed the rebel leader.

In 870 CE (256 AH), a further insurrection was initiated by Ibrahim ibn Muhammad ibn al-Sufi al-Alawi. He proceeded to attack and loot the city of Esna, causing extensive damage to the surrounding areas. Ahmad ibn Tulun deployed his commander Ibn Yazdad to quell the rebellion. However, the Alid leader was successful in defeating and capturing him. Subsequently, Ahmad ibn Tulun dispatched another military contingent under the command of Bahm ibn al-Husayn. This force encountered the insurgents in the vicinity of Akhmim, overcame their opposition, and inflicted significant casualties upon them. The Shi'ite leader subsequently fled to the oases, only to reappear in the vicinity of Hermopolis in 873 CE (259 AH). Ahmad ibn Tulun dispatched another contingent under the command of Ibn Abi al-Mugheeth, who discovered that the insurgent had relocated to Upper Egypt to engage in combat with another individual who claimed to be Abdul Hamid ibn Abdullah ibn Abdul Aziz ibn Abd Allah ibn Umar ibn al-Khattab. The two parties engaged in a fierce confrontation, resulting in the Alid leader's defeat. He subsequently sought refuge in Aswan, where he caused considerable damage and destruction, including the felling of numerous Phoenix. Ahmad ibn Tulun then dispatched Bahm ibn al-Husayn in pursuit, but the rebel evaded capture and fled to ʿAydhab, subsequently crossing the sea to Mecca, where his followers dispersed. Upon reaching Mecca, the local governor apprehended him and conveyed him to Ahmad ibn Tulun, who paraded him through the city before imprisoning him for a period and subsequently releasing him. Subsequently, the rebel proceeded to Medina, where he remained until his demise.

The suppression of Ibn al-Sufi's revolt did not result in the cessation of unrest and rebellion in Upper Egypt. Another follower of his, known as Abu Ruh, whose real name was Sakn, led an uprising in 874 CE (260 AH) in the desert of the Alexandria governorate. He rebelled against Tulunid's rule to avenge his leader and amassed a considerable following, terrorizing travelers and disrupting trade routes. Initially, Ahmad ibn Tulun disregarded Abu Ruh's activities; however, he subsequently dispatched two armies intending to crush the revolt, having learned that Abu Ruh had commenced raiding the Faiyum region. The Tulunid forces emerged triumphant, killing numerous rebels and capturing those who surrendered.

Additionally, Ahmad ibn Tulun confronted the movement spearheaded by Abdul Hamid ibn Abdullah ibn Abdul Aziz ibn Abdullah ibn Umar ibn al-Khattab, also known as Abu Abdul Rahman al-Umari. Although this movement was not explicitly hostile towards the Tulunids, it was directed against the Beja tribes, who were engaged in incursions along the southern border of Egypt. Al-Umari launched an assault on the Beja, resulting in the death of their leader and numerous casualties among his troops. They proceeded to plunder the Beja lands and impose a tribute on them, a demand that had previously been unheard of. Ahmad ibn Tulun was becoming increasingly concerned about the growth of al-Umari's influence and the rising number of his followers. He was determined to prevent any force, regardless of its nature, from emerging that could potentially challenge his authority in Egypt. Ahmad ibn Tulun was concerned that al-Umari's ambitions might extend beyond the Beja to encompass the challenge of his control over all of Egypt. Consequently, he dispatched a substantial military force to confront him. Before the battle, al-Umari approached the Tulunid commander and articulated that his intention was not to invade Egypt or challenge Ibn Tulun. Instead, he asserted that his sole objective was to engage in combat for the sake of jihad. The commander rejected his plea and engaged in battle, where al-Umari was victorious over the Tulunid forces. A few months later, two of al-Umari's servants betrayed him, bringing his severed head to Ahmad ibn Tulun in the hope of gaining favor. Ahmad ibn Tulun ordered their execution, washed and perfumed al-Umari's head, and buried it with honor.

In 875 CE (261 AH), the inhabitants of Barqa initiated an insurrection against the rule of the Tulunids, resulting in the removal of their governor, Muhammad ibn Farukh. The gravity of the insurrection is reflected in Ahmad ibn Tulun's response, which entailed the deployment of three land armies, bolstered by a naval fleet, to quell the rebellion. He directed his commanders to adopt a lenient approach towards the people of Barqa and to utilize force only when strictly necessary. However, the people of Barqa grew bold and opened the gates at night to one of the Tulunid armies, which was led by Abu al-Aswad al-Ghatrif. This resulted in an attack on the army, during which many of its men were killed, including al-Ghatrif himself. Upon learning of this, Ahmad ibn Tulun ordered the remaining commanders to besiege the city. They set up catapults and intensified their assault until the besieged requested amnesty. The Tulunid forces then entered the city, arrested the leaders of the revolt, and sent them to Fustat, where some were executed by crucifixion.

=== Expansion into the Levant ===
Ahmad ibn Tulun's interest in the Levant (al-Sham) goes back to his youth, particularly to the days he spent in the frontier region of Tarsus, where he recognized the strategic importance of the borderlands in defending the Islamic heartland against Byzantine ambitions. The revolt led by Isa ibn al-Shaykh al-Shaybani in Palestine and Jordan provided Ibn Tulun with an opportunity to intervene in Levantine affairs, especially after the Caliph al-Mu'tamid commissioned him to put down the rebellion. Although his efforts were not immediately successful, the uprising alerted him to the political and military importance of the Levant about his ambitions in Egypt. It also motivated him to form a private army to support his expansionist ambitions.

Ibn Tulun realized that he needed to expand eastwards into the Levant to the borders of Iraq and Anatolia for both military and political reasons. The most important of these was to ensure his ability to intervene in caliphal affairs and to guarantee Egypt's security since the Levant was the gateway to Egypt. Any invader, whether Byzantine, Abbasid, or even from within the Levant, would inevitably have to pass through this region to reach Egypt. Moreover, his religious commitment to jihad drove him to annex the Levant to control its frontiers and defend Muslim lands against the growing Byzantine threat. This was particularly urgent as the Byzantines were exerting increasing pressure on the Islamic frontier, especially after the caliphate of al-Mutawakkil, during which the Abbasid caliphate struggled to repel Byzantine attacks.

In addition, the economic importance of the Levant to Egypt played a crucial role in Ibn Tulun's expansionist strategy. Egypt needed the Levant's raw materials, such as wood for shipbuilding, as well as other resources essential to Ibn Tulun's ambitions. During this period, the Levantine frontiers were characterized by a state of turmoil due to the occurrence of various conflicts among the governors appointed by the caliphate. It was not uncommon for these governors to be killed before even arriving to assume their posts. Furthermore, those who did survive typically did not reside in the regions they were assigned to govern. Instead of their direct involvement, they appointed deputies to oversee the administration, taxation, and military operations within their respective jurisdictions. Similarly, Ahmad ibn Tulun himself delegated the collection of taxes from these regions. This practice provoked the ire of Prince Abu Ahmad al-Muwaffaq Talha, the brother of Caliph al-Mu'tamid. This led to a decision being taken to remove Ibn Tulun from his post and appoint Muhammad ibn Harun al-Taghlibi, who was then governing Mosul. However, Ibn Harun was assassinated at the banks of the Tigris River in 260 AH (874 AD) before assuming his new position.

The caliph then appointed Muhammad ibn Ali ibn Yahya as his successor and charged him with governing the frontier regions. However, he was also assassinated after inciting a revolt among the followers of Sima al-Tawil, the Turkic commander who held sway over the frontier regions. Consequently, the Turkic officer Arthur ibn Uluq Tarkhan was appointed as his successor. However, he became preoccupied with indulgences and thus proved to be an inexperienced and incompetent ruler. He was unable to manage the resources effectively, which resulted in a delay in provisions for the inhabitants of Fort Lu'lu'a. This ultimately led to the fort's fall into Byzantine hands, as the inhabitants were unable to withstand the attacks. The caliph was disappointed by this failure and saw it prudent to return control of the region to Ahmad ibn Tulun.

This decision had considerable ramifications, as it became apparent to the local populace that solely Ahmad ibn Tulun was capable of safeguarding the frontier regions and spearheading the jihad against the Byzantines. At this time, the governor of Syria, Amajur, died, and his son Ali was appointed as his successor despite his youth. This, in conjunction with al-Muwaffaq's mounting challenges due to the persisting Zanj Rebellion, which significantly depleted his military strength, presented Ibn Tulun with a chance to gain control of Syria and integrate it into his Egyptian domain. He declined to acknowledge the legitimacy of Ali ibn Amajur's authority and conveyed his sympathies for the demise of his father in a missive. Concurrently, he informed Ali that the caliph had bestowed upon him the stewardship of Syria and its borderlands. Furthermore, Ibn Tulun proclaimed his intention to engage in a jihad against the Byzantines and appealed for provisions and support for his troops. Faced with a lack of viable alternatives, the relatively inexperienced and weak Ali ibn Amajur acquiesced to Ibn Tulun's authority and publicly pledged allegiance to him.

In Shawwal 264 AH (June 878 AD), Ahmad ibn Tulun departed from Al-Qata'i and proceeded to Ramla, where he was met by the city's governor, Muhammad ibn Rafi'. Ibn Rafi furnished him with provisions and reaffirmed his loyalty, for which Ibn Tulun permitted him to retain his position. As he advanced through Palestine, Ibn Tulun proclaimed that he was there to wage jihad, attracting soldiers and volunteers who joined his ranks as he proceeded towards Damascus. Ali ibn Amajur and his court proceeded to greet him, acknowledging his authority, and supplied him with the necessary provisions and fodder.

Ibn Tulun spent several days in Damascus, during which he undertook a comprehensive reorganization of the city's administrative and military structures. Additionally, he ordered that prayers be offered in his name from the pulpits. Additionally, he incorporated the city's military personnel, including soldiers and commanders, into his army. Continuing his campaign, he advanced to Homs, where he dismissed the governor, Isa al-Karkhi, due to complaints from the local population regarding his tyrannical rule. This act was met with approval by the residents of Homs. Ibn Tulun subsequently advanced to Hama, which he captured, and proceeded to Aleppo, which also fell under his control. His military operations subsequently extended into the frontier regions, where he successfully captured Qinnasrin and the al-'Awasim district.

In Antioch, Governor Sima al-Tawil declined to submit to Ibn Tulun's authority, resulting in a siege. The city was eventually captured with the assistance of the local populace, who had been incited to action by resentment of their governor's tyranny and subsequently killed him. Following the fall of Antioch, it was inevitable that Ahmad ibn Tulun would turn his attention to the remaining frontier regions. He proceeded to capture Mopsuestia, and Adana and eventually reached Tarsus, a city of great significance to him. However, the city's governor declined to welcome him and closed the gates against him. According to some sources, Ibn Tulun eventually entered the city with a large retinue, evading any resistance.

Ahmad ibn Tulun could have continued his jihad to its fullest extent, even possibly entering Baghdad itself. However, the political situation in Egypt, including the rebellion of his son Abbas and the receipt of troubling news from his homeland, compelled him to temporarily relinquish his jihadist aspirations and return to al-Qata'i to suppress the uprising. Before this, he needed to ensure the security of the northeastern frontiers of his emirate, where certain local leaders were perceived to present a threat to his territory and achievements. Consequently, he dispatched an army to Raqqa and another to Harran, which resulted in the successful subjugation of these regions to Tulunid authority. Meanwhile, the cities along the Levantine coast, including Tripoli, Acre, and Jaffa, also came under Ibn Tulun's rule as he continued his march through Damascus.

This marked the beginning of a new phase in the relationship between Egypt and Syria, as both regions came under the leadership of a single ruler, coordinating military campaigns and naval operations across the Levantine region and beyond. The Tulunid navy, based in Syria, commenced operations, launching attacks on Aegean Sea islands and Greek cities. Despite the long-standing enmity between them, the Abbasid caliphate even tasked Ahmad ibn Tulun with defending its borders against the Byzantines, particularly along the Euphrates front in northern Iraq, which posed a direct threat to Baghdad itself.

=== Unrest in the Levant against Tulunid rule ===
Ahmad ibn Tulun had designated his chamberlain, Lu'lu', who had assisted him in assuming control of the Levant, as the governor-general of the region before his return to Egypt. Consequently, Lu'lu's authority grew considerably, with prayers being offered in his name after those of the caliph and Ibn Tulun, and his name inscribed on the currency. Nevertheless, by 268 AH (881-882 AD), indications of a schism between Ahmad ibn Tulun and his erstwhile enslaved servant Lu'lu' began to manifest, predominantly due to two principal factors.

The initial point of contention was financial. Ibn Tulun had imposed rigorous tax collection measures on Lu'lu'. The tax collector was directly answerable to Ibn Tulun, which constrained Lu'lu's autonomy and prompted him to express his discontent by seizing a portion of the tax revenue. The second factor was political. Ahmad ibn Tulun appointed his son-in-law, Muhammad ibn Fath ibn Khakan, as governor of Diyār Muḍar without first consulting Lu'lu'. The Abbasid caliphate became aware of this discord, and Muhammad ibn Sulayman al-Katib, an advisor at the Abbasid court, exploited the situation to undermine Ibn Tulun by encouraging Lu'lu' to align with Abu Ahmad al-Muwaffaq Talha and send the tax revenue to him instead.

Ibn Tulun's efforts to reestablish Lu'lu's submission proved unsuccessful. Lu'lu' appropriated one million dinars and defected to al-Muwaffaq, launching attacks and plundering Basra along the way. He proceeded to capture Circesium on his way to Iraq. This political development compelled Ahmad ibn Tulun to embark on a military campaign to the Levant to suppress Lu'lu's rebellion. His objective was to prevent Lu'lu' from entering Iraq, as such an action would have the potential to destabilize his state. Ibn Tulun accelerated, cognizant that al-Muwaffaq, who was on the cusp of quelling the Zanj Rebellion, could leverage Lu'lu's defection against him. Nevertheless, by the time Ibn Tulun reached Damascus, Lu'lu' had already fled to Iraq and joined forces with al-Muwaffaq.

While in Damascus, Ahmad ibn Tulun saw fit to reassert his control over the frontier regions. It was known that Yazman, a servant of Fath ibn Khakan, had become dominant in the area and was incited by al-Muwaffaq to rebel against the Tulunids. Yazman had commenced the process of garnering support and exerting control over the local population, a development that caused concern for Ibn Tulun. Aware of the potential consequences of Yazman's actions and the possibility of a Byzantine threat, Ibn Tulun opted for a diplomatic approach to persuade Yazman to return to his allegiance, while simultaneously instructing his deputy, Khalaf al-Farghani, to launch a campaign against the Byzantines to secure the support of the local population.

Yazman declined Ibn Tulun's conciliatory overtures, prompting Ibn Tulun to order Khalaf al-Farghani to apprehend him. However, Yazman's supporters in Tarsus expelled al-Farghani, declared Yazman their leader, ceased praying for Ibn Tulun in their mosques, and cursed him instead. Upon hearing this, Ibn Tulun personally set out to discipline the rebel. Upon reaching Mopsuestia, he sent emissaries to Yazman, offering him a final chance to submit in exchange for safety. Yazman again refused and fortified himself in Adana.

Ibn Tulun then initiated a siege of Adana, establishing a camp in the plains outside the city in Jumada al-Akhira 270 AH (December 883 AD). In response, Yazman ordered the release of the waters of the Berdan River. The winter season was marked by extreme cold, heavy precipitation, and thick snowfall. The flooding of the plains nearly drowned Ibn Tulun's army, compelling him to retreat under the cover of night without achieving his objective. He spent several days in Mopsuestia before returning to Damascus and then to Egypt. Consequently. Ahmad ibn Tulun's endeavors to maintain comprehensive control over his Levantine territories ultimately proved unsuccessful.

=== Khumārawayh's rise to power ===
This resulted in the weakening of both Egypt and Iraq. Ahmad ibn Tulun was adamant that the Abbasid caliph be treated with respect and that his status be reinstated as a fundamental prerequisite for reconciliation. Al-Muwaffaq concurred, accorded the caliph the honor due him, and discharged him from incarceration. The subsequent action was for the caliphate to acknowledge the legitimacy of the rule in Egypt and the Levant. However, Ahmad ibn Tulun died on Sunday, the 10th of Dhu al-Qi'dah 270 AH (May 10, 884 CE), before this could be accomplished.

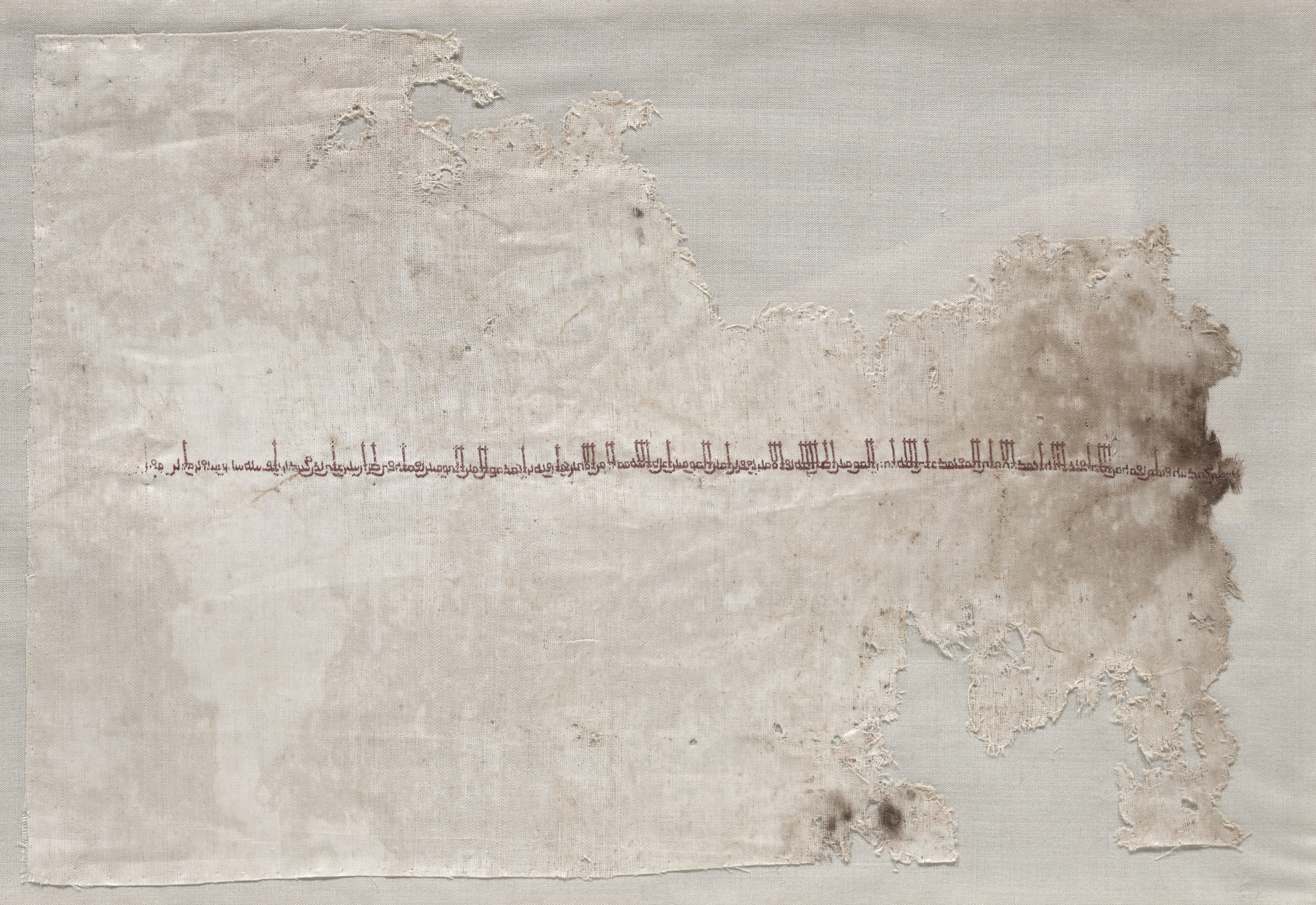
Embroidered tiraz of Emir Khumarawayh b. Ahmad under Caliph al-Mu'tamid. Egypt, Tinnis, Tulunid period. 1932.17, Cleveland Museum of Art.

After his demise, military leaders convened and selected his son, Abu 'l-Jaysh Khumārawayh ibn Aḥmad ibn Ṭūlūn, as his successor, by the deceased's testamentary dispositions and to gratify the troops who had rallied around him to maintain the legacy and acquisitions of the emirate. Khumārawayh was twenty years of age at the time. Ahmad ibn Tulun had left a will for his son, which included a summary of his political experiences and outlined general policies to be followed. He advised him to uphold the caliph's oath as a trust, thereby providing legitimacy to his state; to maintain the army united and loyal; to ensure the allegiance of his slaves and dependents; to stay armed and ready for military action; to eliminate conspiracies from Iraq; to win the favor of the local populace; and to moderate expenditures without extravagance.

Khumārawayh remained faithful to his father's legacy, which he regarded as a comprehensive political blueprint for governing Egypt and the Levant, as well as for navigating relations with the Abbasid caliphate. However, in economic matters, he exhibited a proclivity towards extravagance and luxury. At the outset of his political career, Khumārawayh encountered a challenge with his brother Abbas, who declined to pledge fealty to him or acknowledge his authority. Abbas had previously attempted a rebellion while their father was absent in the Levant, which was swiftly suppressed by Ahmad ibn Tulun. By the provisions outlined in Ahmad ibn Tulun's will, Abbas was to assume governance of the Levant and adjacent territories, acknowledge Khumārawayh's ascension, and submit to his authority. However, Abbas did not comply, as he was unwilling to relinquish his claim to the succession as the eldest son and was under the impression that Khumārawayh would be unable to oppose him.

State officials and close associates were summoned, and the Qur'an was brought for Abbas to swear allegiance. He hesitated and revealed his intent to resist, which aroused suspicion among the military leaders who disliked him for his arrogance and aloofness. His refusal or delay in swearing allegiance to his brother was seen as inevitable, and he was killed shortly thereafter.

Following the successful resolution of his brother Abbas's refusal to recognize his rule, the unification of political and military leadership, and the consolidation of the Tulunid family, Khumārawayh shifted his attention to the strengthening of the military. He proceeded to establish a formidable military force, placing significant emphasis on comprehensive training, equipping the troops with the necessary weaponry, and expanding the army's size. He then proceeded to reorganize the Levant, a region of significant strategic importance for supporting his authority in Egypt. This was of particular urgency since al-Muwaffaq had dealt with the Zanj rebellion in Basra and was now at liberty to pursue Egypt, exploiting Ahmad ibn Tulun's demise and Khumārawayh's youth.

Khumārawayh then proceeded to assign leadership of the major cities and regions in the Levant to his most capable commanders. He subsequently wrote to the Abbasid caliphate, requesting official recognition of his control over these areas in exchange for pledging allegiance and full obedience. However, al-Muwaffaq rejected this request, which incensed Khumārawayh and signaled the continuation of the conflict and resumption of military operations.

Al-Muwaffaq employed a strategy of combining military strength with cunning in his confrontation with Khumārawayh. He capitalized on the situation by exploiting Ishaq ibn Kandaq, the emir of Mosul and the Jazira, who believed he was more deserving of the governorship of the Levant and Egypt. Ishaq ibn Kundaj incited discord within the Tulunid domain, exploiting existing rivalries for his own benefit. He formed an alliance with Ahmad ibn Muhammad al-Wasiti, who had sworn to destroy all that Khumārawayh and Ahmad ibn Tulun had constructed. This was partly due to Khumārawayh's promotion of Mahbub ibn Jaber over al-Wasiti, whom he regarded as a subordinate. Al-Wasiti, concerned about being betrayed by Khumārawayh (given that he had advised the killing of his brother Abbas), was encouraged by al-Muwaffaq.

Upon dispatching al-Wasiti with an army to Iraq to engage in combat with the Abbasids, Khumārawayh received communication from al-Muwaffaq, who sought to sow discord between al-Wasiti and his master. In response to the Abbasid attempts to displace him from the Levant and seize control of Egypt, Khumārawayh swiftly organized both land and naval campaigns to repel the anti-Tulunid alliance and compel the Abbasids to acknowledge his authority through military means.

Map showing the location of the Battle of the Mills between the Tulunids and the Abbasids, near Ramla, Palestine.

The Tulunid armies advanced into the Levant, and upon reaching Palestine, the conspiracy was revealed. Al-Wasiti defected to the Abbasid forces, thereby betraying his former master. The Abbasid forces emerged victorious against the Tulunid army, seizing control of Raqqa, Qinnasrin, and other strategic cities. Furthermore, they were victorious against a considerable military force under the command of Khumārawayh at the mills on the River Abu Fataras in southern Palestine, in the vicinity of Ramla. As the Abbasid troops were engaged in looting, the Tulunids, seizing the opportunity, turned the defeat into a victory. In light of the possibility of a renewed incursion by Khumārawayh, the remaining Abbasid forces opted to retreat to Damascus. However, the city's residents closed the gates, effectively preventing their entry. This support for the Tulunids had a considerable impact on the political situation, resulting in the reunification of the territories under Tulunid control and aligning with the prevailing sentiment against the Abbasids.

Tulunids, under the leadership of Saad al-Aysar, reclaimed the initiative and recovered the majority of the Levantine cities. Subsequently, Saad al-Aysar entered Damascus, delivered a sermon in honor of Khumārawayh, and informed him of the victory. Despite his initial defeat, Khumārawayh was pleased but ashamed and thus increased charitable acts and freed prisoners. He then appointed Saad al-Aysar as the governor of the Levant, who worked to restore security, protect pilgrimage routes from Bedouin attacks, and ensure stability.

For approximately one year, Khumārawayh refrained from direct involvement in Levantine affairs, thereby providing Saad al-Aysar with the opportunity to act on his behalf, ostensibly seeking autonomy from Egypt. Saad al-Aysar miscalculated, accusing his superior of negligence and cowardice, which caused Khumārawayh to become concerned. In response to concerns about Saad al-Aysar's aspirations, Khumārawayh devised a scheme in Ramla that ultimately led to al-Aysar's demise.

The populace of Damascus was incensed by the assassination of their prince and rose against Khumārawayh, denouncing him in the Umayyad Mosque. In response, Khumārawayh proceeded to the city and refrained from exacting revenge. Instead, he secured the allegiance of the populace through the provision of monetary incentives and gifts, thereby reestablishing his authority over Damascus and the wider region.

Subsequently, Khumārawayh initiated military campaigns against his adversaries within their territories, adopting an offensive strategy. He initiated hostilities against Ibn Kandaq, who had been manipulated by al-Muwaffaq, and was joined by Muhammad ibn Abi al-Saj, the governor of Anbar, who had supported al-Muwaffaq due to his interests. They engaged in combat with Ibn Kandaq's forces in the vicinity of Raqqa within the Balikh region and emerged victorious. Ibn Kandaq sought refuge in Mardin, where he reinforced his position. The Tulunid forces pursued his vanquished troops until they reached Samarra.

Khumārawayh assumed control of the Upper Mesopotamia and Mosul regions, appointing Ibn Abi al-Saj as his governor in that area. Subsequently, Ibn Kandaq was compelled to concede and assume a subordinate position, pledging fealty to Khumārawayh and providing support in his governance. Upon Khumārawayh's return to Egypt, Ibn Abi al-Saj, incited by al-Muwaffaq, initiated a rebellion and proceeded to seize Tulunid properties situated within the Euphrates-Jazira region. Khumārawayh was compelled to return to the Levant with a considerable military force. He encountered the Abbasid troops, led by Ibn Abi al-Saj, at the Thaniya al-Uqab in proximity to Damascus. He emerged triumphant, pursuing Ibn Abi al-Saj to Mosul and subsequently to Tikrit.

In this manner, Khumārawayh was able to eliminate his enemies who had allied against him, secure his eastern borders, and extend his influence from Barqa to the Euphrates and from Anatolia to Nubia. In recognition of his efforts in the Euphrates-Jazira region, the caliphate added Armenia to his domains. The caliph acknowledged Khumārawayh's rule over these territories and confirmed it, thereby ensuring a hereditary rule for him and his descendants in Egypt and the Levant for thirty years. Furthermore, Yazaman, the ruler of the border regions, acknowledged his authority and offered prayers on the border minibars. On 18 Rajab 279 AH (October 14, 892 CE), the Abbasid caliph died and was succeeded by al-Mu'tadid, who assumed the title of "al-Mu'tadid blah." He reaffirmed the caliphate's recognition of Khumārawayh and his descendants' rule over the territories they controlled for thirty years. Furthermore, a marriage alliance was formed between the Abbasid and Tulunid families when Khumārawayh married his daughter, Qatr al-Nada, to the caliph al-Mu'tadid.

The first challenge he faced was the invasion of Syria by armies sent by al-Muwaffaq, the de facto ruler during the reign of caliph al-Mu'tamid. Khumārawayh also had to deal with the defection of Ahmad ibn Muhammad al-Wasiti, a long-time and key ally of his father's, to the invaders' camp.

The young Tulunid achieved political and military gains, enabling him to extend his authority from Egypt into northern Iraq, and as far north as Tarsus by 890. Being now a prominent player in the Near Eastern political stage, he negotiated two treaties with the Abbasids. In the first treaty in 886, al-Muwaffaq recognized Tulunid authority over Egypt and the regions of Syria for a thirty-year period. The second treaty, reached with al-Mu'tadid in 892, confirmed the terms of the earlier accord. Both treaties also sought to confirm the status of the Tulunid governor as a vassal of the caliphal family seated in Baghdad.

Despite his gains, Khumārawayh's reign also set the stage for the demise of the dynasty. Financial exhaustion, political infighting and strides by the Abbasids would all contribute to the ruin of the Tulunids. Khumārawayh was also totally reliant on his Turkic and sub-Saharan soldiers. Under the administration of Khumārawayh, the Syro-Egyptian state's finances and military were destabilized.

=== Decline of the Tulunid emirate ===
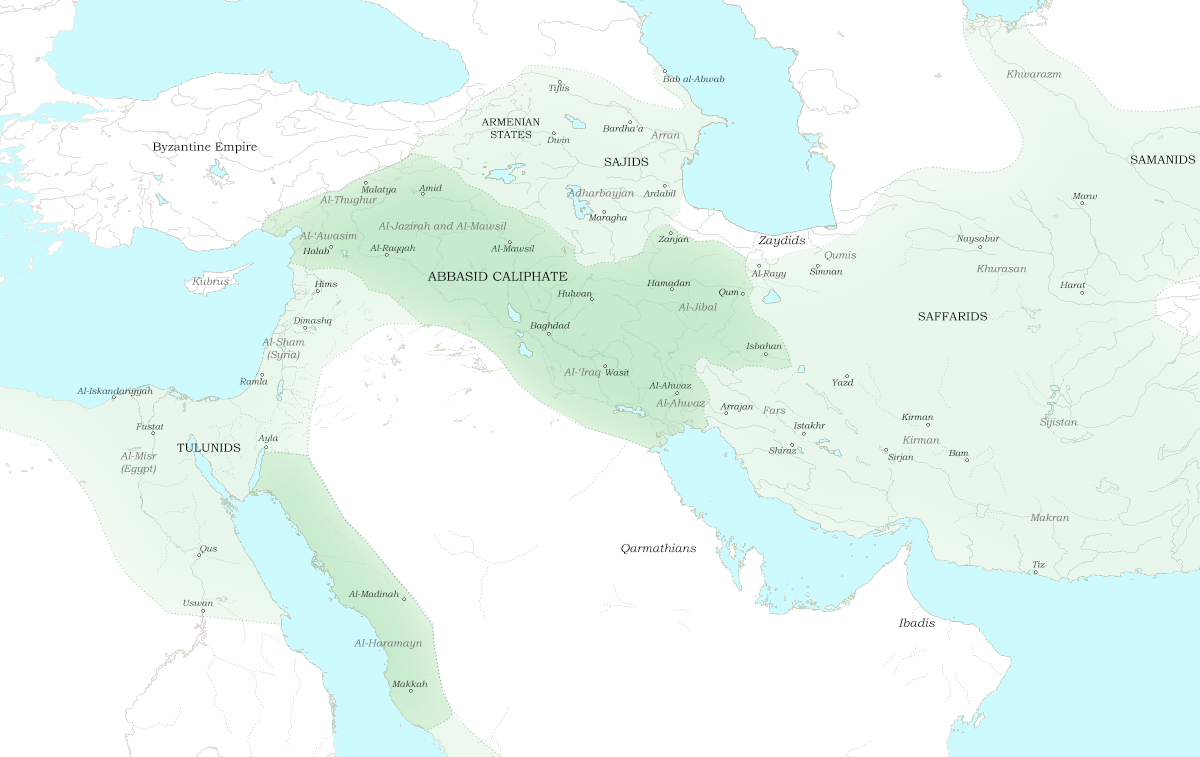
Map of the Abbasid Caliphate circa 900, showing approximate territories controlled by the Tulunids and other autonomous dynasties within the caliphate at the time

Khumārawayh constructed a palace at the base of Mount Qasioun, situated near Damascus and the Dayr Murran, where he would often imbibe alcohol. He was assassinated in this palace by his servants due to his excessive indulgence in wine and other vices on the 28th of Dhu al-Qi'dah, 282 AH, corresponding to January 18, 896 CE. On that night, the governor of the Levant, Prince Tughj ibn Juff, was present at the palace. Upon learning of the murder, he pursued the perpetrators, who were more than twenty servants, and apprehended them. They were subsequently executed. He subsequently transported Khumārawayh's body in a coffin from Damascus to Egypt. The day of his arrival was notable for the wailing and customary mourning practices of women observed by his concubines, male slaves, and the wives of his leaders upon his arrival. The male slaves, with their garments, loosened, exhibited indications of mourning, some even tearing their clothes. The city was filled with tumult and lamentations until the burial ceremony was completed. This occurred at a time when it was unthinkable that he would be killed at the height of victory and triumph, causing the emirate to fracture and fall. The unexpected demise of Khumārawayh signaled the imminent decline of the Tulunid dynasty. The Tulunid house appeared to have depleted its reservoir of capable leaders who could perpetuate the state's prosperity. The systems devised by the founder, which had endured for twenty-six years, seemed to be predicated on shaky foundations. Consequently, the emirate swiftly gravitated towards an era of fragility and disintegration, culminating in the collapse of the Tulunid rule within a decade.

Khumārawayh's entourage selected his son Abu al-Asakir Jaysh, who was less than fourteen years of age, to assume the role of ruler of Egypt and the Levant in his place. This decision effectively bypassed his adult uncles, the sons of Ahmad ibn Tulun, who were capable of fulfilling the role in question. This decision was made to maintain their privileges, which resulted in his coronation as a child who had not yet been influenced by the passage of time or the accumulation of experience and knowledge. Jaysh was an inept prince, preoccupied with frivolity and indulgence, surrounded by a corrupt cohort of Africans and Greeks who exhibited a lack of respect for the country's traditions and public manners. They encouraged him to pursue leisure activities and to disregard moral principles.

These developments prompted some leaders among the Maghrebis, Berbers, and Khazars, who had previously expressed support for Ahmad ibn Tulun and his sons, to demand that Jaysh abdicate the throne in favor of one of his uncles. Jaysh declined the request and had his uncle Abu al-Ashaa'ir Nasr, a distinguished Tulunid leader renowned for his role in the Battle of the Mills, executed. He then presented Nasr's head to the rebels. This prompted the Turkic leaders who had allied with the rebels to flee Egypt and proceed to Kufa, where they were greeted by Caliph al-Mu'tadhid and received by numerous leaders and princes.

Furthermore, the governor of the Levant, Tugj ibn Jaf, exploited the internal strife in Egypt to challenge the Tulunid authority, refusing to acknowledge the authority of a young prince and his corrupt entourage. He ceased to be mentioned in the Friday sermon and proceeded to assume control of the affairs in his region. Tugj ibn Jaf's rebellion was a significant threat to the stability of the Tulunid Dynasty during this period, as it posed a direct danger to the eastern borders of the state. The situation was further complicated by the fact that he commanded a substantial Tulunid military force and exercised control over the region's abundant resources, which significantly undermined the stability of the Tulunid rule. Additionally, the frontier regions likewise declined to acknowledge the authority of a minor ruler. Ahmad ibn Tughjan, the Tulunid deputy in the frontier regions, publicly expressed his discontent with the prevailing circumstances, effectively withdrawing his allegiance from the declining state and disobeying the orders of the young prince Jaysh. He promptly initiated the process of deposing him. The unrest in Egypt against Jaysh's rule extended to his entourage and those around him. Several military leaders and loyalists deposed him and imprisoned him on the 10th of Jumada al-Thani, 283 AH, corresponding to July 25, 896 CE. They proceeded to loot his house and, shortly afterward, killed him.

On the day that Jaysh was deposed, several influential powers and military leaders gathered and swiftly appointed Abu Musa Harun ibn Khumārawayh, who was a minor and not yet fourteen years of age, as a figurehead. This was ostensibly done to demonstrate loyalty to the Tulunid house. They were concerned that a prominent member of the Tulunid family might assume control, challenge their agendas, and hold them responsible for their actions. Consequently, they consented to install an individual who was unable to contest their machinations, which resulted in the emirate's internal deterioration and its decline.

During Harun's tenure, a series of significant internal events precipitated the emirate's inevitable decline. The administrators, recognizing their inability to adequately address the emerging issues and challenges, retreated in the face of significant political dangers in the Levant and the frontier regions. Meanwhile, Harun was preoccupied with leisure activities and alcohol consumption, and they recognized their inability to subdue Tugj ibn Jaf. Consequently, an attempt was made to negotiate with him on a political level, with the sending of an envoy to offer recognition of Harun's rule in exchange for the retention of his influence in the Levant. This diplomatic effort was ultimately successful, leading to the resolution of outstanding issues in the Levant. However, the situation in Egypt subsequently deteriorated. The court faction divided the power and public offices among themselves, thereby creating centers of influence within the state apparatus and pursuing their interests. As a result, they effectively monopolized authority and control over state affairs, thereby becoming the dominant force in the management of the state. A number of these individuals exercised control over various groups of troops, which were then compelled to obey their commands, effectively becoming their subordinates. Each of these leaders possessed extensive administrative powers. Abu Ja'far ibn Abi assumed guardianship over the young prince, while Badr al-Hamami managed Levantine affairs without hindrance. They also intensified their oppression of Ahmad ibn Tulun's supporters, persecuting and scattering them. As a result, the unity of the state and the army was compromised.

Harun's reign also saw the occurrence of significant external events that accelerated the decline of the Tulunid emirate and ultimately resulted in its collapse. In 284 AH (897 CE), while Ahmad ibn Tughjan, the Tulunid governor of the frontier regions, was engaged in a war with the Byzantines, Raghid al-Khadem, a freedman of al-Mu'tadid who had come to Tarsus for jihad, removed the Tulunid call to prayer and instead called for Badr, the freedman of the caliph al-Mu'tadid. The Abbasid caliph perceived an opportunity to intervene in Tulunid affairs, erode the emirate's autonomy, and reincorporate the regions it controlled into the Abbasid state. This was particularly the case following Ahmad ibn Tughjan's departure from Tarsus and return to Egypt, where he appointed his deputy Damiana to oversee the city's governance. The caliph exhorted Raghid to challenge Damiana and the military commander Yusuf ibn al-Baghmardi, who had been designated as his successor. The confrontation resulted in Raghid's triumph; he captured both opponents and conveyed them to Baghdad, thereby curbing Tulunid's influence in the frontier regions, particularly Tarsus, and rendering their presence there inconsequential.

The final decisive factor in the decline of Tulunid influence in the frontier regions was the action of the local population itself. Delegations from these regions approached the caliph to request his attention to their affairs, the management of their frontier, and the appointment of a leader to guide them in jihad against the Byzantines, particularly since they were left without a ruler after the Tulunid governor was expelled due to his mismanagement. It appears that the caliph accepted this subordination and appointed Ibn al-Akhsheed as the emir of the frontier regions. Subsequently, the caliph directed his attention to the Jazira region and the upper Euphrates, to annex them from Tulunid control. Faced with a confluence of political and military pressures, including the loss of some cities in the Levant and frontier regions and internal weakening, the Tulunids were compelled to negotiate the terms of their continued presence in exchange for the caliph's recognition of their rights in Egypt and the Levant in 285 AH (898 CE). Furthermore, the caliph imposed a humiliating treaty on the Tulunids, compelling them to relinquish control over Aleppo, Qinnasrin, and the capitals; pay 450,000 dinars annually to the Bayt al-mal, and agree to the appointment of a representative of the caliph in Egypt to oversee its affairs.

The situation for the Tulunids in the Levant became increasingly critical with the emergence of a new force that was destined to eliminate what remained of Tulunid influence as per the recent agreement with the Abbasids. This new force, Qarmatians, threatened to undermine the Tulunids’ remaining prestige and strengthen the caliphate’s position as the savior of the Islamic world, thus nullifying any promises made to the Tulunids and providing a legal basis for invading Egypt and eradicating the Tulunids.

Qarmatians, who had swept through the Levant spreading chaos and disruption, proved too formidable for the Tulunid army to counter effectively. As a result, Tulunid prestige waned among the people, and cries of discontent and protest surged throughout the Islamic world in western Asia. Letters from scholars and notable figures in Egypt and the Levant were sent to the caliphate requesting assistance. The caliphate, seizing the opportunity to intervene and assert its presence and gains in the Levant while showcasing the weakness of the Tulunids, decided to confront the Qarmatians first in the Levant and then to eliminate the Tulunids both there and in Egypt. Following the death of al-Mu'tadid and the ascension of al-Muqtafi to the caliphate, the caliph resolved to tackle the Qarmatians and then deal with the Tulunids. The caliph mobilized a large army and sent successive military expeditions to the Levant to deal with the Qarmatians. The first army, consisting of ten thousand soldiers, was sent to Aleppo and camped in the nearby Batanan Valley. However, they were ambushed and defeated by the Qarmatian forces, with many of them killed. Only the commander Abu al-Aghar and a few of his soldiers, numbering fewer than a thousand, managed to enter Aleppo. The Qarmatians pursued them and besieged the city, but with the help of its residents, Abu al-Aghar managed to lift the siege after fierce battles, killing many of the besiegers. Meanwhile, the caliph reached al-Raqqa and dispatched a substantial military force under the command of Muhammad ibn Sulayman al-Katib to pursue and eliminate the Qarmatians. This force engaged the Qarmatians in the vicinity of Hama, vanquished them, and effectively neutralized the threat they posed in the Levant in 291 AH (904 CE). The Qarmatian leader Hasan ibn Zikrawayh and over three hundred of his followers were apprehended and conveyed to the caliph, who ordered their immediate execution.

Muhammad ibn Sulayman had barely celebrated his victory over the Qarmatians when he was ordered by the caliph to prepare for war against the Tulunids. He initiated preparations for this campaign, enlisting leaders who had previously served in the Tulunid army and were intimately familiar with Egypt's terrain, many of whom had fled during Abu al-Asakir Jaysh's reign. He assembled an army of ten thousand soldiers, predominantly from the Khurasani region. The caliph supported this ground force with a naval campaign, sending the commander of the Abbasid fleet in the Levant and Egypt to enforce a naval blockade on the Tulunid frontiers and cut off their supplies.

Muhammad ibn Sulayman al-Katib advanced with his army to Damascus and entered the city without encountering any resistance. The remaining Tulunid forces in the Levant, along with the Tulunid governors who were discontented with Harun, joined him. He proceeded with his advance into Palestine, where the Tulunid governor, Sayf ibn Suwar, pledged allegiance and joined his forces.

Harun endeavored to resist the Abbasid armies and regain the allegiance of the governors of the Levant, but his efforts were met with indifference. During this period, the Abbasid fleet reached the city of Tinnis, where it encountered and vanquished the Tulunid fleet, resulting in the city's capture. Subsequently, the fleet proceeded to Damietta, where it achieved a second victory against the Tulunid forces, seizing their ships and capturing their sailors. The fleet continued its advance towards al-Fustat, destroying the eastern bridge connecting it to al-Rawda and the western bridge connecting it to Giza. This action severed the city's supply lines, creating an opportunity for the land forces to breach the city.

In these critical circumstances, Harun was killed by his uncles Shayban and Uday while intoxicated on the night of Sunday, 19 Safar 292 AH (December 31, 904 CE). Shayban assumed the role of leader. Upon recognizing the disintegration of the Tulunid military and the inadequacy of their opposition, Muhammad ibn Sulayman al-Katib advanced from Palestine into Egypt. Facing the imminent threat of a counteroffensive, Shayban ibn Ahmad's forces retreated to defend the capital. The Abbasid forces pursued them, reaching al-Fustat and al-Qata'i, where they laid siege to the cities. The Abbasid fleet also advanced and blockaded the cities by river. Despite the Tulunid resistance, both cities faced continuous bombardment from land and river. This situation led Muhammad ibn Sulayman al-Katib to offer terms of surrender to Shayban in exchange for his and his men's safety. Upon learning of this, Shayban's troops abandoned him and joined the Abbasid army.

Subsequently, Shayban was compelled to petition for the protection of himself and his family, which was duly granted. However, the soldiers were not cognizant of this truce. The following day, the two armies engaged in another confrontation, resulting in the defeat of the Tulunid forces. Abbasid troops, under the command of Muhammad ibn Sulayman, invaded al-Qata'i and violated the truce that he had previously granted to Shayban. The Tulunid family was treated harshly, expelled from Egypt, and sent to Baghdad with their possessions and treasures, while their wealth was confiscated. The Tulunid state thus fell, and Egypt was re-integrated into the Abbasid realm as it had been thirty-seven years earlier, with Muhammad ibn Sulayman al-Katib appointed as the governor by the caliph.

== Culture ==
Ahmad ibn Tulun founded his own capital, al-Qatā'i, north of the previous capital Fustat, where he seated his government. One of the dominant features of this city, and indeed the feature that survives today, was the Mosque of Ibn Tulun. The mosque is built in a Samarran style that was common in the period during which the caliphate had shifted capitals from Baghdad to Samarra. This style of architecture was not just confined to religious buildings, but secular ones also. Surviving houses of the Tulunid period have Samarran-style stucco panels.

Ḵh̲umārawayh's reign exceeded his father's in spending. He built luxuriant palaces and gardens for himself and those he favored. To the Tulunid Egyptians, his "marvellous" blue-eyed palace lion exemplified his prodigality. His stables were so extensive that, according to popular lore, Khumarawaih never rode a horse more than once. Though he squandered the dynastic wealth, he also encouraged a rich cultural life with patronage of scholarship and poetry. His protégé and the teacher of his sons was the famed grammarian Muḥammad ibn ʿAbd Allāh ibn Muḥammad Muslim (d. 944). An encomium was written by Ḳāsim b . Yaḥyā al-Maryamī (d. 929) to celebrate Khumarawaih's triumphs on the battlefield.

Through the mediation of his closest adviser, al-Ḥusayn ibn Jaṣṣāṣ al-Jawharī, Khumārawayh arranged for one of the great political marriages of medieval Islamic history. He proposed his daughter's marriage to a member of the caliphal family in Baghdad. The marriage between the Tulunid princess Ḳaṭr al-Nadā with the Abbasid caliph al-Mu'tadid took place in 892. The exorbitant marriage included an awesome dowry estimated at between 400,000 and one million dinars. Some speculate that the splendours of the wedding were a calculated attempt by the Abbasids to ruin the Tulunids. The tale of the splendid nuptials of Ḳaṭr al-Nadā lived on in the memory of the Egyptian people well into the Ottoman period, and were recorded in the chronicles and the folk-literature. The marriage's importance arises from its exceptional nature: the phenomenon of marriage between royal families is rare in Islamic history. The concept of dowry given by the bride's family has also been absent in Islamic marriages, where mahr, or bride price has been the custom.

Aḥmad ibn Ṭūlūn's support to Sunni scholars also allowed for the development in Egypt of Islamic sciences, especially hadith transmission, which contributed to the Islamization of the hinterland. The official support granted by ibn Ṭūlūn to the Shafi'i school of Islamic jurisprudence did much to resuscitate and popularize it after it went into decline during the Mihna.

=== Urban construction ===
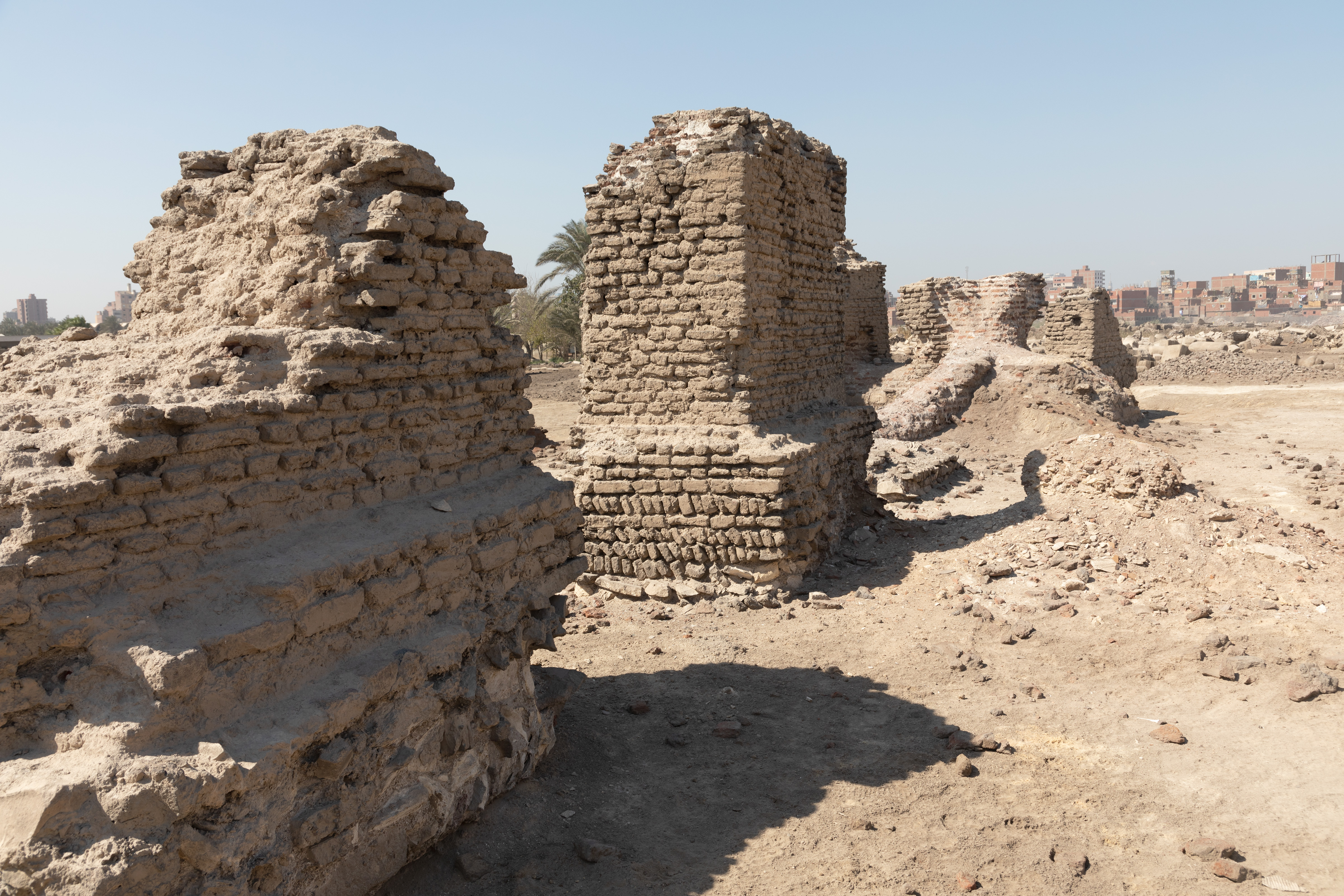
Remains of the city of Fustat, now an archeological site within modern Cairo (2017 photo)

Following Ahmad ibn Tulun's declaration of Egypt's independence from the Abbasid Caliphate, he initiated a program to elevate Fustat to a status comparable to that of the Caliphate's centers in Baghdad and Samarra. As his residence became insufficient to accommodate the growing number of servants and soldiers, he opted to expand it. He selected a site in the distant northeastern section of al-Askar, situated between Mount Yashkur and the foothills of the Mokattam, near the governor's residence. In 257 AH (870 AD), a new suburb, designated "al-Qata'i," was established over an area estimated at one square mile. He then proceeded to lay out his palace in this location and instructed his companions, servants, and followers to construct buildings around it. The construction continued until it became integrated with the wider development of Fustat. The district was subdivided into sections, each designated by the name of its inhabitants. For instance, a distinct quarter was designated for the Nubians, another for the Romans, a third for the tent-makers, and individual sections were allocated for each group of servants, identified by their respective trades. The leaders constructed a multitude of disparate edifices, thereby rendering al-Qata'i a meticulously planned district replete with thoroughfares and byways, places of worship, mills, hammams, ovens, and markets. It subsequently developed into a sizable metropolis, exhibiting greater prosperity and aesthetic appeal than other cities in the region. The architectural style, whether about residential or religious structures, reflected the Samaritan design prevalent in the Caliphate's capital at the time. Additionally, Ibn Tulun constructed a hospital (bimaristan) in the suburbs, where patients received free medical care and medication.

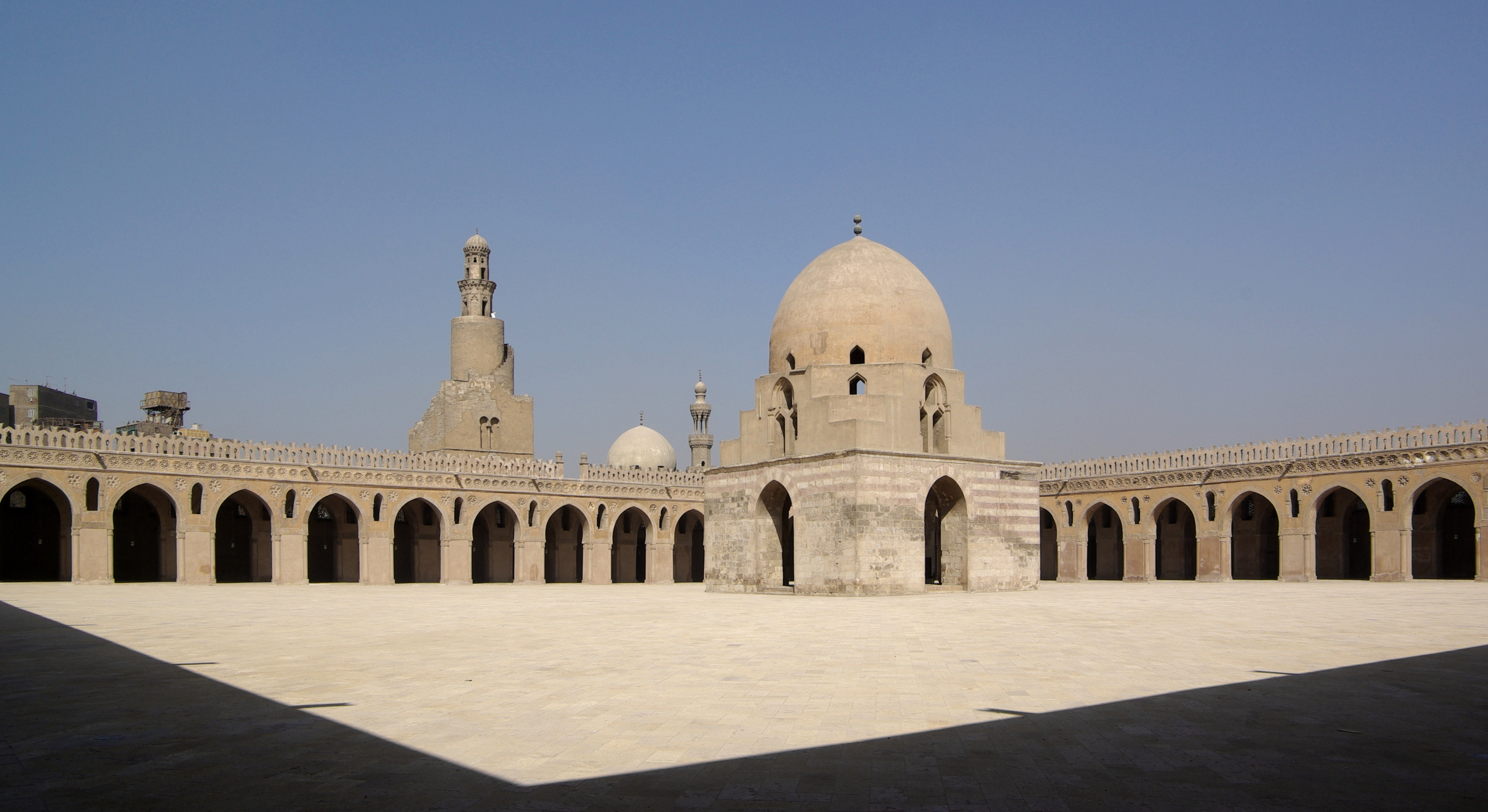
Ibn Tulun Mosque, the only architectural monument from the Tulunid era.

Ahmad ibn Tulun meticulously constructed his new palace, which featured a lush garden and a vast parade ground for military displays, and polo matches. The entire complex was designated "al-Midan." This magnificent edifice was conceived in the style of the palaces of the caliphs in Baghdad and incorporated pavilions. The structure had multiple gates, each with a designated appellation: Bab al-Midan, Bab al-Sawalijah, Bab al-Khassa, Bab al-Jabal, Bab al-Haram, Bab al-Darmun, Bab Du'naj, Bab al-Saj, and Bab al-Salat, also known as Bab al-Siba'. The thoroughfare extending from Ibn Tulun's abode to the palace was broad, and he delineated it with a wall, erecting three substantial gates. The thoroughfares were interconnected in a linear fashion. These gates were typically only opened on select occasions, such as Eid, military parades, or charity days. Outside of these events, they were opened only at specific, pre-arranged times.

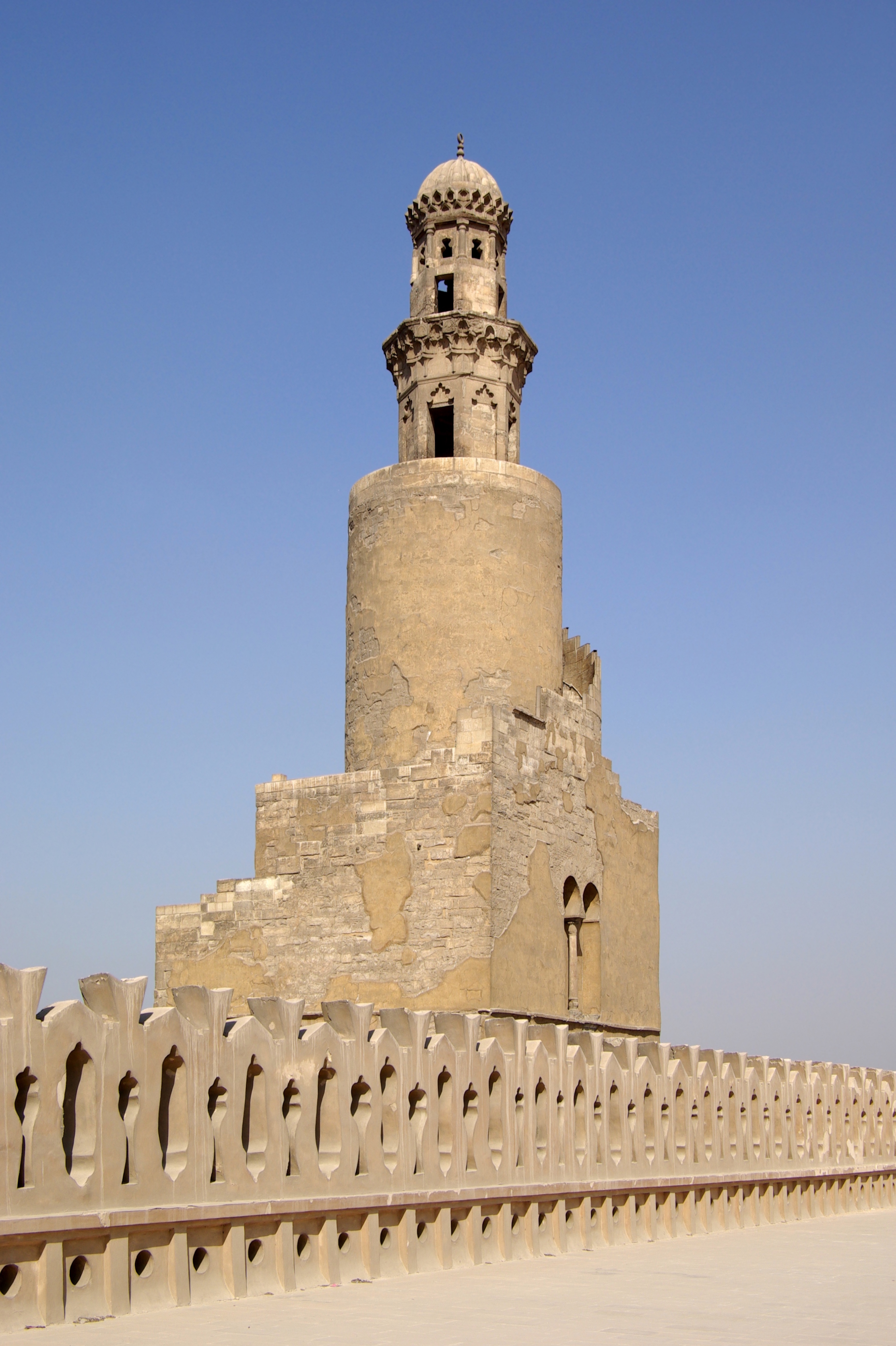
The minaret of the Ibn Tulun Mosque, inspired by the spiral minarets of Samarra

The most enduring legacy of Ahmad ibn Tulun's architectural endeavors is his mosque, which is currently known as the Ibn Tulun Mosque. It is regarded as one of the oldest surviving mosques in Cairo. The mosque was constructed on Mount Yashkur due to the limitations of the original mosque, which was situated near the police station. This earlier mosque had become insufficient in accommodating the worshippers, particularly during Friday prayers. Ibn Tulun had discovered a sum of money on the mountain in a place known as "Tannour Pharaoh," and he used this money to fund the construction of the mosque and the spring known as "Ayn Abi." A Christian engineer with the requisite expertise oversaw the construction of the mosque and the spring, which commenced in 263 AH (877 AD). The edifice was completed in the month of Ramadan in the year 265 AH (879 AD). Upon completion of the mosque, it was whitewashed, decorated, and adorned with hanging lamps. The floors were covered with mats from the Abdaniya and Samanid regions, and boxes of Qur'ans were brought in, along with readers and scholars. The design of the mosque was inspired by the Great Mosque of Samarra.

This enthusiasm for architectural design manifested in Ibn Tulun exaggeratedly and lavishly during the tenure of his son, Khumarawayh. Khumarawayh expanded his father's palace and transformed the parade ground into a garden. This garden was filled with various aromatic plants, exotic grafted trees, and different types of flowers, saffron, and water lilies. He planted a variety of trees, including palm, apricot, and almond, and crossbred some of them. He constructed waterwheels for irrigation and built a tower from teakwood, which he used to house birds such as doves, sparrows, and swallows. In his residence, he constructed a hall designated as the "House of Gold," where the walls were entirely coated with gold mixed with lapis lazuli and inscribed with life-sized images of himself and his wives on wooden panels. Additionally, Khumarawayh constructed a menagerie within his residence, comprising cages capable of holding a lion and a lioness each. He also established stables for a variety of animals. This extravagance ultimately contributed to the weakening of the Tulunid state. The vast majority of the architectural works created by the Tulunids were ultimately destroyed, except the mosque. Upon the arrival of the Abbasid army in al-Qata'i, the city was burned to the ground, and its belongings and furniture were transported to the Caliphate's capital city. This was an attempt by the Abbasids to erase the remnants of the state that had defied their authority for so many years.

=== Religion ===
Islam was the dominant religion within the Tulunid state, with the majority of the population in Egypt and the Levant adhering to Sunni Islam. Additionally, a smaller contingent of Twelver Shi'ism inhabited select locales within the Levant, including Jabal Amel in southern Lebanon and various settlements along the coast and inland. While the Abbasid Caliphate's official state religion was Hanafi Islam, other Islamic schools of thought were also prevalent and practiced. Those desirous of seeking judgment according to the tenets of the Maliki, Shafi'i, or Hanbali schools were accommodated.

During the Tulunid era, a considerable number of jurists and hadith scholars emerged. Notable among the Maliki scholars was Muhammad ibn Abdallah ibn al-Hakam al-Misri, who died in 268 AH (881 AD) and served as the mufti of Egypt. He was the most prominent Malik ibn Anas in Egypt, attracting students from the Maghreb and Al-Andalus, and he authored a substantial body of work. Other noteworthy Maliki scholars included Muhammad ibn Asbagh ibn al-Faraj (d. 275 AH/888 AD), Ruh ibn al-Faraj Abu al-Zanba' al-Zubayri (d. 282 AH/895 AD), and Ahmad ibn Muhammad ibn Khalid al-Iskandari (d. 309 AH/921 AD).

Among the Shafi'i scholars, al-Rabi' ibn Sulayman al-Muradi (d. 270 AH/883 AD) is worthy of particular mention. He was a close associate of Imam al-Shafi'i and the principal narrator of his works. Al-Shafi'i himself lauded al-Rabi', stating, "Al-Rabi is my narrator" and "No one served me as al-Rabi did." Other Shafi'i jurists included Qahzam ibn Abdallah al-Aswani (d. 271 AH/884 AD), who was originally Christian and one of al-Shafi'i's students. He resided in Aswan. Another notable figure was Abu al-Qasim Bishr ibn Mansur al-Baghdadi (d. 302 AH/914 AD), who traveled to Egypt and studied the Shafi'i school. Among the most prominent Hanafi jurists was Judge Bakkar ibn Qutayba al-Thaqafi (d. 270 AH/883 AD). Another noteworthy figure was Ahmad ibn Abi Imran (d. 285 AH/898 AD), who was one of the most prominent Hanafi scholars and the instructor of al-Tahawi.

The non-Muslim subjects, designated as "dhimmi," experienced peace and stability during the Tulunid period, which resulted in enhanced conditions and the unhindered practice of their religious rituals. The Tulunid rulers exhibited benevolence towards dhimmis, particularly Christians. Ahmad ibn Tulun is noteworthy for his efforts to safeguard the rights of these groups and to punish any mistreatment by his officials and commanders. Notably, historical sources from this period provide little information about History of Jews in Egypt and the Levant or their role in political life. This is also the case during the time of the Umayyad governors. Jewish population is believed to have been largely peaceful, preoccupied with their personal affairs and discreetly conducting business activities, largely disengaged from political and governmental matters. Despite the paucity of available documentation from this period, Maurice Fargeon posits that the Jewish community in Egypt was substantial, comprising numerous affluent and prominent businessmen. Evidence of Jewish wealth during this era includes the incident when Ahmad ibn Tulun imposed a fine of 20,000 dinars on the Coptic Patriarch, Anba Michael I. This resulted in the Patriarch being forced to sell some church properties in Egypt, which were purchased by Jews. These included some church endowments and lands near Fustat, as well as a church adjacent to the Hanging Church in the Qasr al-Sham'a district. The Jews of this period were able to enjoy religious, social, and economic freedom. They were able to practice their rituals in peace and engage in several professions, including land ownership, trade—especially in currency—and the sciences and medicine.

Meanwhile, Christians continued to play an important role in the administration of the country, much as they had during the Umayyad period. They held positions as tax collectors and scribes and even participated in the police force, thereby contributing to the maintenance of security and order. Papyrus documents have revealed the names of numerous Christians who were engaged in the collection of taxes, occupying positions such as "Qastal" and "Jahbadh." Ahmad ibn Tulun and his ministers employed Christian scribes, including two brothers named Yohanna and Ibrahim ibn Musa, who served as scribes for Ibn Tulun. Furthermore, Ahmad ibn al-Mardani, who served as minister, also employed a Christian scribe named Yohanna. Furthermore, Ibn Tulun employed Christian servants, including a man named Anduna, after whom the village of Anduna in Giza was named.

Ahmad ibn Tulun frequently visited the monks of the Deir al-Qasr monastery, where he would withdraw to Galali for contemplation. He maintained a close relationship with a wise monk named Anduna, from whom he sought counsel and direction. Khumarawayh, son and successor of Ahmad, also relied on Christian personnel to maintain security and order in certain regions of Egypt and to defend the country's borders. According to Coptic accounts, the Bishop of Tima, Anba Bakhum, had approximately 300 servants who were responsible for maintaining security in his region. Many of these servants were skilled archers, and Anba Bakhum held a high status with Khumarawayh, who relied on them for security, intelligence, and border defense, particularly against the Fatimids in the Maghreb.

Khumarawayh demonstrated a benevolent attitude towards all dhimmis, with a particular focus on Christians. He exhibited a keen interest in their welfare, particularly that of the bishops and monks. Historical sources do not document any instances of mistreatment or damage to churches and monasteries perpetrated by him. However, one historian references a Coptic manuscript from the Tulunid period, stating that Ibn Tulun did not treat all social classes equally. He favored the Turks over other Muslims and the Melkites over other Christians. Additionally, he viewed the Patriarch of the Jacobites as a significant adversary, seizing every opportunity to impose fines on him, which resulted in the Patriarch's church being maintained in a state of extreme poverty.

=== Science and literature ===
The Tulunid period saw Egypt become renowned for its medical advancements. Notable among the physicians was Sa'id ibn Tarfayl, a Christian who served Ahmad ibn Tulun. Another prominent figure was Sa'id ibn Batriq, also a Christian, who authored several works, including his historical text Al-Tarikh al-Majmu' ala al-Tahqiq wa al-Tasdiq ("The History Assembled for Verification and Confirmation"). During this period, there were also notable writers whose works focused on historical and geographical subjects. One of the most prominent figures was Abd ar-Raḥman bin ʿAbdullah bin ʿAbd al-Ḥakam, renowned for his expertise in hadith and narration, who subsequently developed a profound interest in history and storytelling. His oeuvre includes Futuh Misr ("The Conquests of Egypt"), and he is regarded as the inaugural historian to document the Islamic topography of Egypt.

Another noteworthy historian of the Tulunid period was Abu Ja'far Ahmad ibn Yusuf, who is also known as Ibn al-Daya. He authored a biography of Ahmad ibn Tulun, another on Khumarawayh, and several other works, including Akhbar Ghulaman Bani Tulun ("The Accounts of the Slaves of Bani Tulun"), Husn al-Uqba ("The Good Outcome"), Akhbar al-Atibba ("The Accounts of the Physicians"), and Al-Mukafaa ("The Reward"). Another noteworthy Tulunid historian was Abu Muhammad Abdallah ibn Muhammad al-Madini, who is known as al-Balawi. Ibn al-Nadim states that al-Balawi was a learned individual, versed in both Islamic jurisprudence and preaching. He is credited with numerous written works, including Kitab al-Abwab ("The Book of Doors"), Kitab al-Ma'arifa ("The Book of Knowledge"), and Kitab al-Din wa Fara'iduh ("The Book of Religion and Its Obligations"). Despite the loss of these texts, Ibn al-Daya's Sira Ahmad ibn Tulun ("The Biography of Ahmad ibn Tulun") remains a pivotal source for the study of Egyptian and Islamic Near Eastern history in the latter half of the third century AH (9th century AD).

The Tulunid period also saw a flourishing of linguistic studies. Among the most notable linguists was al-Walid ibn Muhammad al-Tamimi, who is known as Wallad. Additionally, the linguistic school gave rise to Ahmad ibn Ja'far al-Dinawari, the author of Al-Muhadhdhab fi al-Nahw ("The Refined in Grammar"), Abu Jaʿfar an-Nahhas, the author of Ma'ani al-Quran wa Mansukhuh ("The Meanings of the Quran and Its Abrogations"), and Muhammad ibn Hassan al-Nahwi.

== Military ==
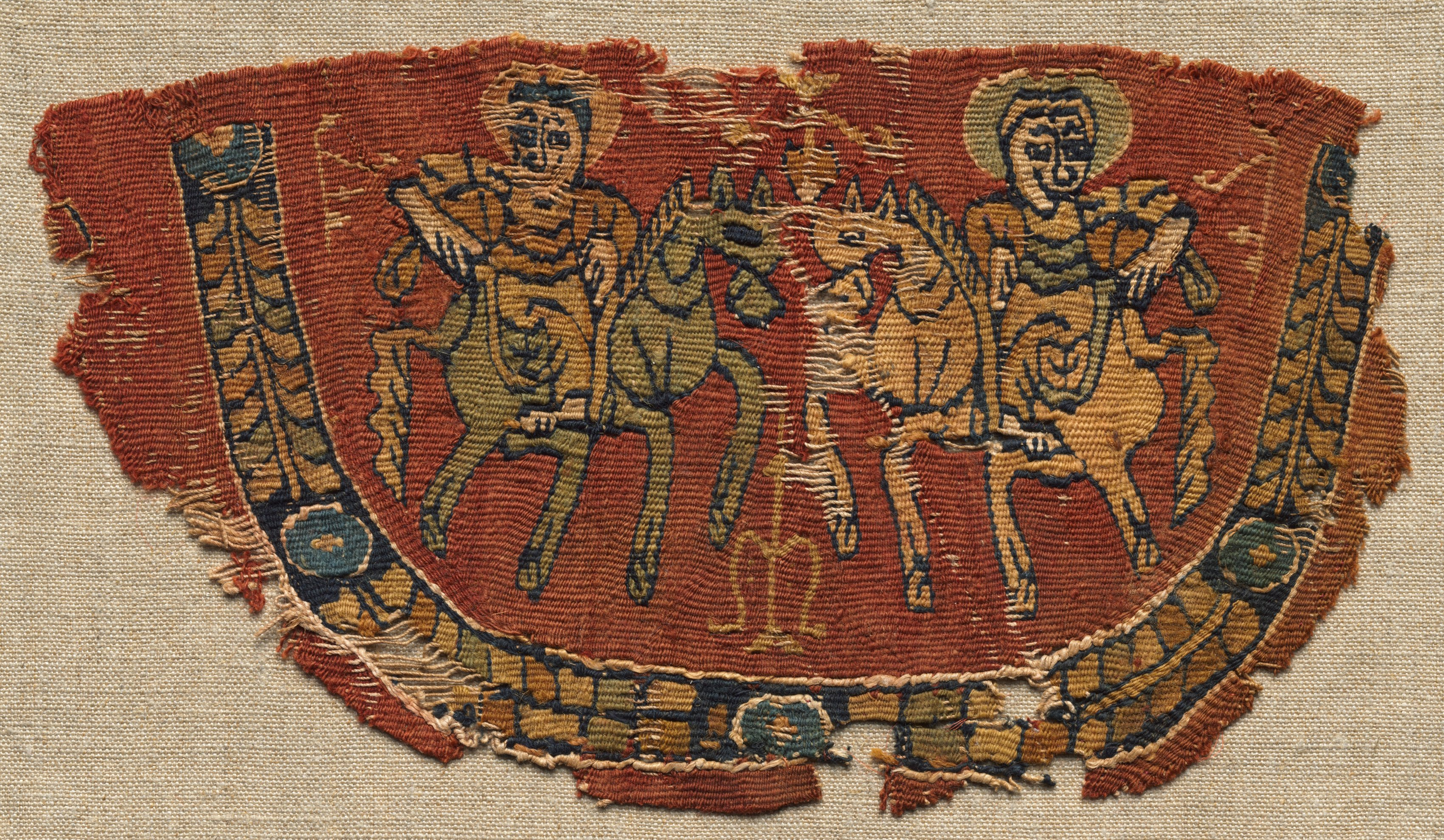
Fragment of an ornamental border of a tunic. Egypt, late Abbasid or Tulunic period, 9th century. 1916.1678, Cleveland Museum of Art.

Ahmad ibn Tulun was keenly aware of the pivotal role that a well-trained military force could play in realizing his ambitious goals. From the moment he set foot in Egypt, he sought to establish a military that was loyal to him and could be relied upon as a tool to achieve his goals and maintain his independence. Ahmad ibn Tulun's aspiration to establish a distinctive military force was first revealed when he observed the personal guard of Ahmad ibn al-Mudabbir and sought to emulate this structure for his purposes. However, his initial political caution, concern about inciting suspicion from the Abbasid Caliphate, and the need for financial resources, which were controlled by Ibn al-Mudabbir, prevented him from taking this bold step immediately. Ahmad ibn Tulun's opportunity arose when Isa ibn al-Shaykh al-Shaybani, the governor of Palestine and Jordan, rebelled against the Abbasid Caliphate, exploiting the weakened state of the latter. He proceeded to assume control of Damascus, terminate the practice of tribute to Baghdad, and endeavor to extend his influence into Egypt. Upon the ascension of Caliph al-Mu'tadid, Isa declined to pledge fealty and eschewed the Caliph's name from prayers in the territories he controlled. The Abbasid Caliphate's objective to reassert its authority coincided with Ahmad ibn Tulun's aspiration to impede the incursion of Levantine forces into Egypt. The Caliphate dispatched a missive to Ahmad ibn Tulun, requesting assistance in suppressing the rebellion. This provided the pretext for him to petition for permission to augment his troops and construct a formidable military force, which the Caliphate duly approved.

Having observed the domination and oppression of the Turks during his tenure in Baghdad, Ahmad ibn Tulun was cautious in allowing a single ethnic group to predominate in the military, thereby potentially influencing the state's affairs. To circumvent the missteps of the Aghlabids, who relied predominantly on Arab forces, Ahmad ibn Tulun resolved to diversify the composition of his army. He recruited 24,000 Turks, 40,000 Black Africans, and 7,000 Arabs, and the remainder of his 100,000-strong army consisted of other ethnic groups, including Romans and Afghans.

Ahmad ibn Tulun undertook a significant expansion and fortification of his military forces, motivated by the perceived threats and machinations against him within the Abbasid capital. As previously stated, his army ultimately reached a strength of 100,000 men. He managed this vast force through a meticulously devised and effectively implemented strategy, appointing trusted Turkic officers to command positions. The army was consistently prepared to execute orders, engaged in rigorous training, quelling rebellions, and conquests. Ahmad ibn Tulun rewarded his soldiers generously to ensure their loyalty and morale. He provided them with wealth, status, and comfort, treating them as if they were his sons. He paid their salaries on time and even granted them bonuses equivalent to a year's salary, which ensured that no uprisings occurred due to delayed payments, which was common during that era. On occasion, he would give his soldiers an entire year's salary as a gift, further strengthening their loyalty.

Ahmad ibn Tulun also accorded priority to the naval fleet, although its development was somewhat slower than that of the army. The necessity for a robust naval force became evident as he extended his dominion into the Levant and was compelled to safeguard his coastal frontiers from Byzantine incursions while ensuring the security of maritime routes between the Levant and Egypt. His concern for the navy intensified as the Abbasid regent al-Muwaffaq sought to reclaim Egypt, prompting him to construct fortifications on the Nile island and to build numerous ships. He came to recognize the importance of the fleet in completing his military preparations, eventually assembling a fleet of 100 large ships and 100 military vessels, in addition to various other types of boats.

Following the death of Ahmad ibn Tulun, his successor Khumarawayh continued to enhance the Emirate's military capabilities by enlisting new soldiers from Central Asia, particularly from the Turkic contingent, and integrating local Syrians and Egyptians into the military structure. As a result, the proportion of national personnel in the army increased considerably. Additionally, Arab residents from regions such as Hawf, renowned for their courage, were recruited, trained, and organized into a special unit designated "Al-Mukhtara" (The Chosen). This unit was used as a personal guard for Ahmad ibn Tulun, alongside the Black African troops.

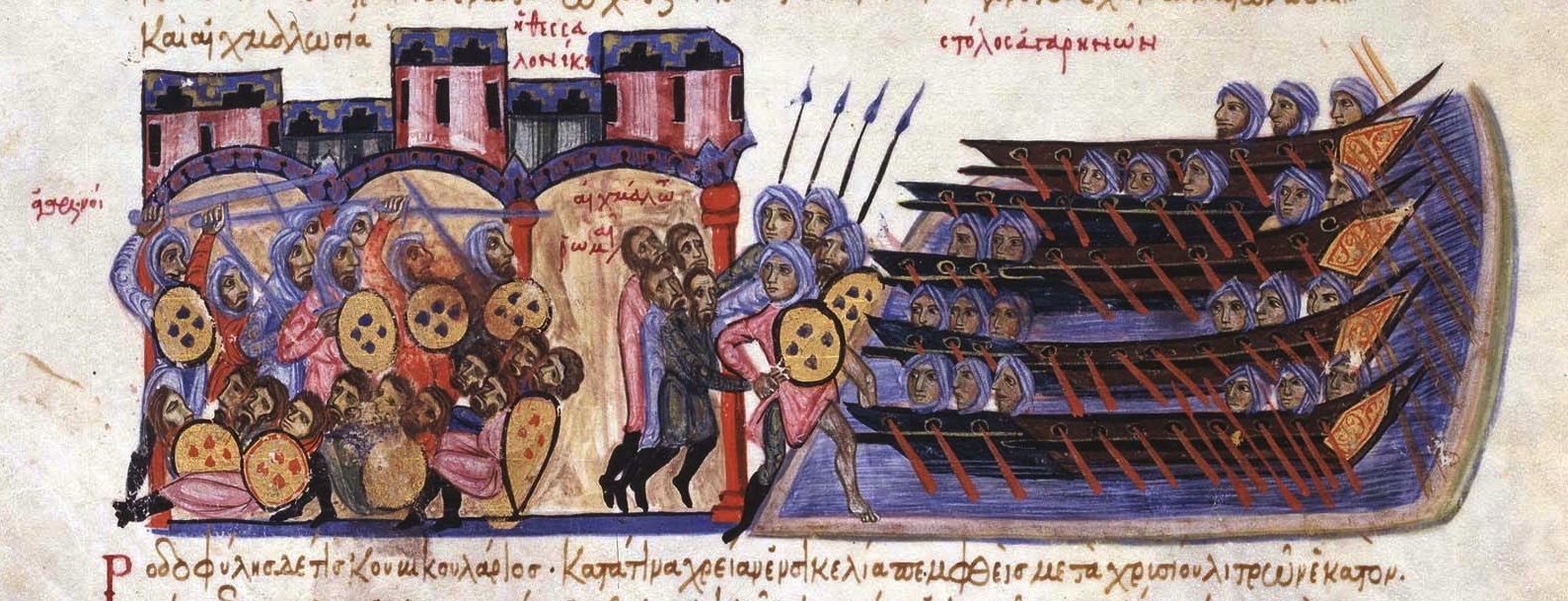
A Roman miniature showing the Tulunid Muslim fleet from the Levant and Egypt invading the city of Thessaloniki.

Khumarawayh made significant investments in the military's attire and weaponry. He furnished his troops with luxurious silk cloaks and intricately embroidered armor, as well as ornate swords worn on the shoulder. This level of opulence reflected the grandeur that was characteristic of his era, extending to almost every aspect of life. When his army paraded before him, each unit was distinctly attired and equipped, with the "Al-Mukhtara" (The Chosen) at the vanguard, followed by other military divisions and then the Black Africans.

Khumarawayh placed considerable emphasis on the training of his army, assigning specific roles to each unit in combat and providing generous funding to meet their needs. He provided more substantial benefits than his father had, ensuring regular pay and ample rewards on various occasions, in addition to the spoils of war. This financial support fostered a mutual interest that bound the soldiers to the state, with the result that annual expenses for the army reached 900,000 dinars. This investment elevated the status of the army, thereby conferring greater influence upon its soldiers and leaders than had been the case during the reign of Ahmad ibn Tulun. Commanders acquired considerable land holdings, and the various units played a pivotal role in the state's foreign policy, particularly in the wars in the Levant and the defense of the emirate. Khumarawayh also accorded the naval fleet a high degree of priority, which played a vital role in supporting the army's campaigns in the Levant and reinforcing the land operations.

The need for the establishment of an autonomous armed force became apparent after the revolt of ʿĪsā ibn al-Shaykkh, governor of Palestine, in 870. In response, Ibn Tulun organized an army composed of Sudanese and Greek slave-soldiers. Other reports indicate the soldiers may have been Persians and Sudanese. Ḵh̲umārawayh continued his father's policy of having a multi-ethnic army. His military prowess, in fact, was strengthened by his multi-ethnic regiments of black Sudanese soldiers, Greek mercenaries and fresh Turkic troops from Turkestan.

Ibn Tulun founded an élite guard to surround the Tulunid family. These formed the core of the Tulunid army, around which other larger regiments were built. These troops are said to have been from the region of Ghūr in Afghanistan, during Ibn Tulun's reign, and from local Arabs during the reign of Ḵh̲umārawayh. In a ceremony held in 871, Ibn Tulun had his forces swear personal allegiance to him. Nevertheless, there were defections from the Tulunid army, most notably of the high-ranking commander Luʾluʾ in 883 to the Abbasids. Throughout its life the army faced such persistent problems of securing allegiance.

Khumārawayh also established an elite corps called al-mukhtāra. The corps was composed of bedouins from the eastern Nile delta. By bestowing privileges upon the tribesmen, and converting them into an efficient and loyal bodyguard, he brought peace to the region between Egypt and Syria. He also re-asserted his control over this strategic region. The regiment also included one thousand Sudanese natives.

A list of military engagements in which the Tulunid army constituted a significant party is as follows:

- In 877, the Tulunid troops, after displaying their strength, forced the Abbasid army under Mūsā ibn Bug̲h̲ā to abandon his plan to depose Ahmad ibn Tulun.
- In 885, the Tulunid army led by Khumarawayh met the invading Abbasids at the Battle of the Mills (al-Ṭawāḥīn) in southern Palestine. The Abbasids, led by Aḥmad ibn al-Muwaffaḳ (the future Caliph al-Mu'tadid), had invaded Syria, and the governor of Damascus had defected to the enemy. After both Ahmad and Khumarawayh fled the battlefield, the Ṭūlūnid general Saʿd al-Aysar secured victory.
- From 885 to 886, the Tulunid forces, led by Khumarawayh, defeated Ibn Kundād̲j, though the latter had superior numbers. A domino effect followed, as the Jazira, Cilicia and regions as far east as Harran submitted to the Tulunid army. Peace treaties with the Tulunids put an end to the military campaigns.
- From 896 to 905, after the emirate's demise the Tulunids were unable to stop the Abbasids from taking their capital al-Qata'i.

== Economy ==
Before Ibn Tulun's arrival, Egypt's economic situation was severely compromised. The economic instability commenced during the tenure of Caliph Abu Ja'far al-Mansur, who required that a fixed amount of kharaj be remitted by provincial governors to the capital while failing to oversee their activities. Consequently, the governors levied supplementary taxes on the populace and collected them with considerable rigor. This situation further deteriorated during the second Abbasid era with the advent of Turkic feudalism. Provinces were divided among Turkic military leaders, who implemented oppressive tax and agricultural policies to increase revenues by any means necessary. Upon assuming responsibility for the collection of kharaj, Ibn al-Mudabbir increased taxes fourfold. He imposed taxes on pasture lands, fishing rights, and even on Arecaceae, acacia, and albizia trees, and monopolized the natron industry. These actions precipitated an economic collapse, and a decline in production, and brought the country to the brink of bankruptcy. Ahmad ibn Tulun was aware of the necessity to address the country's economic challenges to rescue it from its current situation and establish a stable economic foundation. His initial action was to assume control of the kharaj system. He removed Ibn al-Mudabbir from his position and assumed direct and absolute control over the administration of kharaj. He appointed trusted and loyal officials in the financial administration, dismissed those known for corruption, and imposed strict oversight on the employees of this office. This prevented them from arbitrarily imposing taxes as they had done previously. Furthermore, he prohibited the practice of workers exploiting their positions for personal gain. This strategy proved to be one of the most effective measures he took to stabilize the country's affairs and prevent further exploitation.

During the reign of Ahmad ibn Tulun, the Egyptian economy remained prosperous. There were propitious levels of agricultural production, stimulated by consistent high flooding of the Nile. Other industries, particularly textiles, also thrived. In his administration, ibn Tulun asserted his autonomy, refusing to pay taxes to the central Abbasid government in Baghdad. He also reformed the administration, aligning himself with the merchant community, and changing the taxation system. Under the Tulunids, there were also repairs in the agricultural infrastructure. The key sector of production, investment, and participation in their Mediterranean-wide commerce, was textiles, linen in particular (Frantz, 281–5). The financial bureaucracy throughout the Tulunid period was headed by members of the al-Madhara'i family.

Ahmad ibn Tulun initiated a series of reforms about the monetary system, including the minting of a new Tulunid dinar. This currency was distinguished by its substantial weight and high degree of purity, which were perceived to be free from any adulteration. This action served to reinstate financial confidence and stability within the market. He based the majority of his revenue on the kharaj (land tax), believing that with the implementation of proper distribution, regulation, and collection methods, it could become one of the country's most significant financial resources. From the time he assumed responsibility for public finance, he eschewed corrupt practices, revoked unjust, obsolete taxes that previously yielded no more than 100,000 dinars annually, and abolished taxes on pasturelands, fishing, and timber. Additionally, he removed the restrictions on the utilization of natron. As a consequence of these reforms, Egypt's kharaj revenue increased to an unparalleled level of approximately 4.3 million dinars. In terms of improving production, Ahmad ibn Tulun implemented measures to protect both farmers and producers, thereby instilling a sense of security through administrative reforms that quelled internal unrest. He protected farmers from the exploitation of tax collectors, ensured the availability of agricultural land and sufficient water supplies, repaired and dug new irrigation canals, and restored dilapidated dams. Furthermore, he put an end to the abusive practices of tax contractors against farmers, which led to improved agricultural conditions, increased agricultural income, and state involvement in agricultural production. Ibn Tulun seized and cultivated abandoned agricultural lands, oversaw the exploitation of properties formerly belonging to the governor of Egypt, and distributed a portion of the kharaj to the original inhabitants of these lands. A special department, known as the "Diwan al-Amalik," was established to manage these lands.

Despite his lack of involvement in commercial activities, his currency reforms fostered confidence in the economy, thereby enhancing the trade balance. As a result, traders were able to regain trust in the Egyptian economy and returned to the markets in significant numbers. The capital formerly remitted from Egypt to Baghdad was now expended within the country, thereby enhancing the conditions of military personnel, civil servants, and domestic staff. Egypt became a focal point for substantial economic activity. Ibn Tulun established a protective boundary around Egypt to safeguard its economy, thereby ensuring that books and valuable goods could not leave the country without his permission.

Ibn Tulun's industrial reforms included the promotion of textile manufacturing in various cities, including Tinnis, Alexandria, Oxyrhynchus, Hermopolis, Damietta, and Akhmim. Additionally, he facilitated the growth of the arms industry. The revitalization of factories contributed to industrial growth. The comprehensive reforms implemented by Ahmad ibn Tulun resulted in the acquisition of substantial financial resources, with kharaj alone generating four million dinars, and stable prices. These achievements significantly facilitated Ibn Tulun's pursuit of independence.

=== Financial autonomy ===
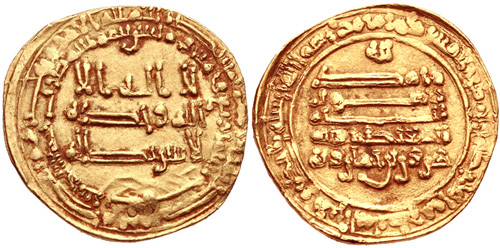
Gold dinar of Harun ibn Khumarawayh.

During the period of 870–872, Ibn Tulun asserted more control over Egypt's financial administration. In 871, he took control of the kharaj taxes as well as the thughūr from Syria. He also achieved victory over Ibn al-Mudabbir, the head of the finance office and member of the Abbasid bureaucratic élite.

The de facto ruler of the Abbasid caliphate, al-Muwaffaq, took issue with Ibn Tulun's financial activities. He wanted to secure Egyptian revenue for his campaign against the Zanj rebellion (and perhaps limit the autonomy of the Tulunids). This pressing need for funds drew the attention of Baghdad to the considerably more wealthy Egypt. The situation came to a head in 877, when al-Muwaffaq, upon not receiving the demanded funds, sent an army to depose Ahmad ibn Tulun. Nevertheless, on at least two occasions, Ibn Tulun remitted considerable sums of revenue, along with gifts, to the central Abbasid administration.

Under Ahmad's son, Khumarawayh, the Abbasids formally entered into a treaty with the Tulunids, thereby ending hostilities and resuming the payment of tribute. Financial provisions were made in the first treaty in 886 with al-Muwaffaq. A second treaty with al-Mu'taḍid, the son of al-Muwaffaq, in 892, re-affirmed the political terms of the first. Financially, the Tulunids were to pay 300,000 dīnārs (though this figure may be inaccurate) annually.

=== Tulunid administration ===
The Tūlūnid administration over Egypt bore several notable features. The style of rule was highly centralized and "pitiless" in its execution. The administration was also backed by Egypt's commercial, religious and social élite. Ahmad ibn Tulun replaced Iraqi officials with an Egyptian bureaucracy. Overall, the administration relied on the powerful merchant community for both financial and diplomatic support. For example, Maʿmar al-Ḏj̲awharī, a leading member of the merchant community in Egypt, served as Ibn Ṭūlūn's financier.

The Tulunid administration also helped the economy prosper, by maintaining political stability, which in Egypt is a sine qua non. Isolated revolts among the Copts and some Arab nomads in upper Egypt, which never threatened the dynasty's power, were actually a response to the more efficient Tulunid fiscal practices. The economy was strengthened by reforms introduced both immediately before the Tulunids and during their reign. There were changes in the tax assessment and collection system. There was also an expansion in the use of tax-contracts, which were the source of an emergent land-holding élite in this period. Ahmad ibn Tulun's agrarian and administrative reforms encouraged peasants to work their lands with zeal, despite the heavy taxes. He also terminated the exactions of the administration's officers for their personal profit.

One final feature of the administration under Ibn Ṭūlūn was the discontinuation of the practice of draining off the majority of his revenue to the metropolis. Instead, he initiated building programs to benefit other parts of Egypt. He also used those funds to stimulate commerce and industry.

=== Large expenditures ===
Ḵh̲umārawayh inherited a stable economy and a wealthy state from his father. The treasury was worth ten million dīnārs at the young Tulunid's succession. When Ḵh̲umārawayh was killed in 896, the treasury was empty, and the dinar had sunk to one-third its value. Part of this financial disaster is attributed to his addiction to luxury, while squandering wealth to win loyalty was also another cause.

Ḵh̲umārawayh, unlike his father, spent lavishly. For example, he gave his daughter, Ḳaṭr al-Nadā, an extraordinary dowry of 400,000 - 1,000,000 dīnārs, for her wedding in 892 to the Abbasid al-Muʿtaḍid. This move is speculated by some scholars to have been an attempt by the Abbasids to drain the Tulunid treasury.

== Relations with neighboring countries ==
=== Relations with Abbasid Caliphate ===
Ahmad ibn Tulun acknowledged the spiritual authority of the Abbasid caliph as the leader of all Muslims and continued to offer prayers for him from the pulpits of mosques in Egypt and the Levant. In contrast to numerous Turkic rulers, he held the caliphate in high regard, a sentiment shaped by his military-religious upbringing and unwavering devotion to Islam. Nevertheless, the relationship between the Tulunids and the Abbasids was more akin to a cold war due to the intrigues and schemes that Abbasid politicians wove against Ibn Tulun and his successor, his son Khamarawayh, in the Abbasid court. One of the most significant adversaries faced by Ibn Tulun from the Abbasids was Prince Abu Ahmad Talha, the brother of Caliph al-Mu'tamid. Talha controlled public affairs in the Abbasid court and led a reform movement aimed at strengthening central authority and consolidating its control over its provinces, including Egypt. He was intent on maintaining exclusive control over both Syria and Egypt, which were of significant political and economic importance. Consequently, he sought to eradicate the Tulunid emirate, which had separated from the central administration in Baghdad, established control over Egypt, and began to look towards Syria.

In response, Ahmad ibn Tulun took action to defend his rights in Egypt and confronted the most significant power in the Abbasid state, which was not the caliph—with whom he had mutual ties and interests—but the power of al-Mu'affiq Talha. The rivalry and conflict between them were evident. The conflict continued between al-Mu'affiq and ibn Tulun until the latter's death. Neither side succeeded in destroying the other, so they both sought to improve their relations and rectify what had gone wrong. This involved removing curses and insults from the pulpits. The caliphate almost recognized the legitimacy of ibn Tulun's rule; however, this was not to be, due to his death.

Al-Mu'affiq persisted in his machinations against the Tulunids, inciting forces in Syria against them throughout the tenure of Khamarawayh. His activities did not cease until his demise on 21 Safar 287 AH (corresponding to June 4, 891 CE). With his demise, the Tulunid state was relieved of one of its most formidable adversaries. The relationship between the Tulunids and the Abbasids was enhanced through the formation of a familial alliance through matrimony. Khamarawayh entered into a marital alliance with Caliph al-Mu'tadid by marrying his daughter, Qatr al-Nada. The Caliph was receptive to this union and saw it as a strategic opportunity for an alliance. Each party had disparate motives. Khamarawayh's objective was to establish enduring ties of amity between the two dynasties and to enhance the prestige and influence of the Tulunid family, a feat that was seldom accomplished. Such a marriage between a caliph and a provincial governor was a notable phenomenon, representing a unique and intriguing aspect of the historical record. It can be reasonably assumed that Khamarawayh was employing a strategic approach in an attempt to persuade the caliph to renew the peace treaty and acknowledge his hereditary rule. This strategy was likely similar to the financial offers that he had previously presented.

Conversely, the caliph required financial resources and sought to increase his wealth by imposing a substantial dowry on Khamarawayh. He anticipated that the bride would be adorned in a manner befitting the grandeur of the caliphate, thereby facilitating the transfer of wealth and gifts from the Tulunids into the central treasury, which was experiencing severe financial difficulties. The marriage took place in 282 AH (895 CE). The caliph's expectations were met as Khamarawayh lavishly prepared his daughter, aiming to demonstrate the economic superiority of the Tulunid family over the caliphate's court and to exhibit the opulence and prosperity they enjoyed. This objective was achieved when the people of Baghdad were astonished by the treasures brought by the bride, which they had not seen since the days of Harun al-Rashid and al-Ma'mun.

=== Relations with Byzantine Empire ===
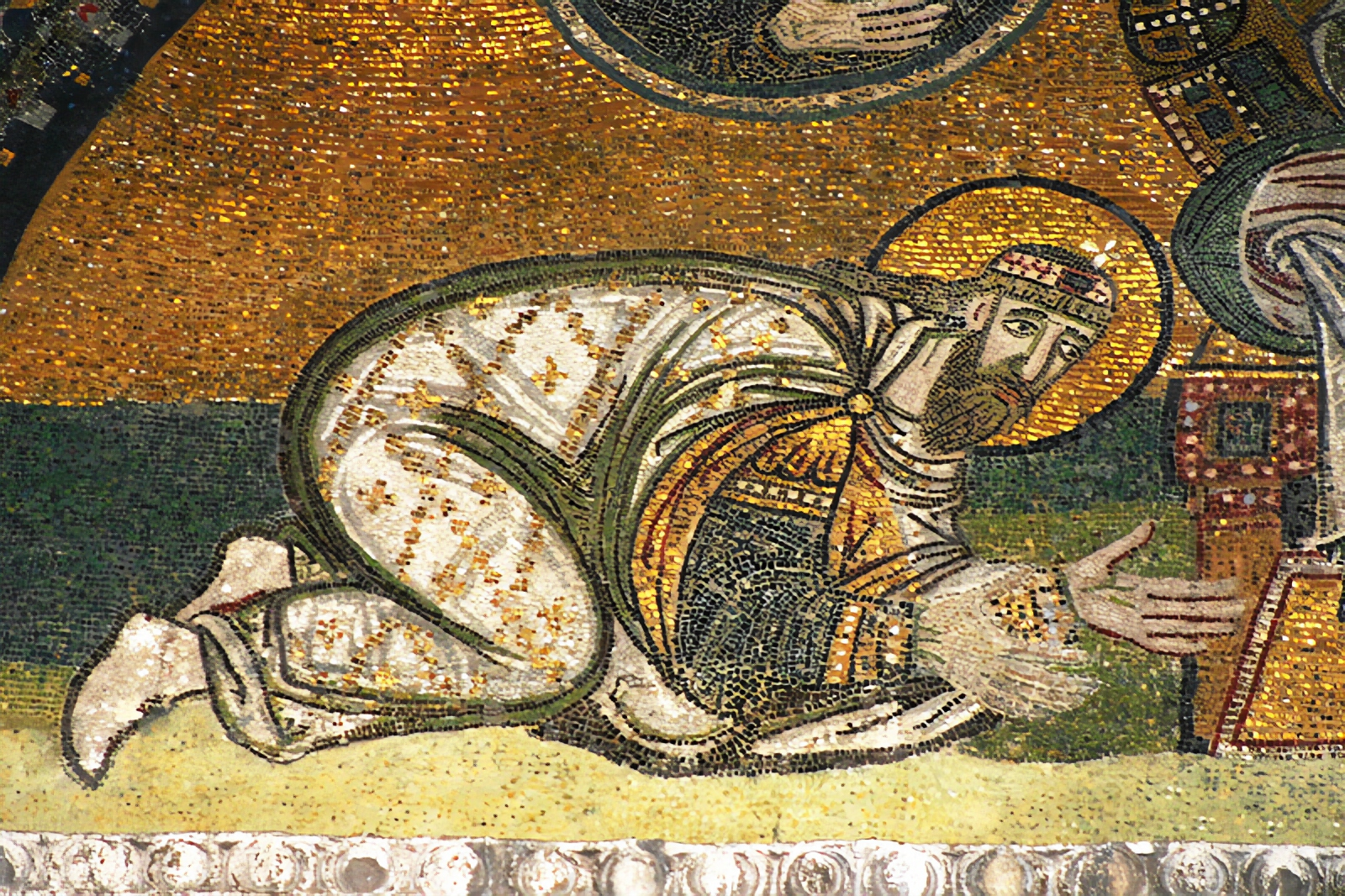
Part of a mosaic depicting the Roman Caesar Emperor Leon VI, known as al-Hakim, prostrating before Christ (not shown) in Hagia Sophia. This emperor lasted until the collapse of the Tulunid state, and his reign saw the Muslims advance at the expense of the Romans in Anatolia.

The relationship between the Tulunids and the Byzantines was marked by a history of enmity, stemming from the fact that Ahmad ibn Tulun held the position of emir over the frontier regions. The Byzantines harbored ambitions of reclaiming their control over that part of Anatolia and expelling the Muslims, particularly as the Abbasid state weakened, thereby diminishing the caliphate's prestige and allowing military leaders to gain greater influence. The Byzantines were able to secure a few fortresses and border towns, but they did not advance further.

During the reign of Emperor Leo VI (273-299 AH / 886-912 CE), the Byzantine Empire lacked the military strength to confront the Muslims in both the east and west. Consequently, this emperor sought to ally with the Armenian Kingdom to counter the Muslims on the eastern front. However, internal disputes among the Byzantines regarding the emperor's marriages complicated the struggle between the Muslims and Byzantines. During the initial fourteen years of Leo VI's reign, the empire suffered a series of defeats on both the eastern and western fronts. In the east, the Byzantines were vanquished at the gates of Cilicia, while in the west, Muslim victories led to their advancement along the coast and deep penetration into Anatolia.

Khamarawayh pursued a policy of jihad against the Byzantines that was consistent with his father's approach, cooperating with Yazman, the governor of the frontier regions. This strategy resulted in notable victories on land and at sea. The fruitful collaboration between the two in the struggle against the Byzantines continued throughout Yazman's life. Yazman, renowned for his military expeditions, initiated the summer campaign in Jumada al-Akhirah 278 AH (September 891 CE) alongside Ahmad ibn Tughqan al-Ajifi. He sustained injuries from a catapult's projectile before the siege of Silindo and subsequently succumbed to his wounds on 14 Rajab, corresponding to October 22. He was subsequently conveyed to Tarsus for interment.

Following the death of Yazman, Khamarawayh was eager to continue the jihad, intervening in the appointment and dismissal of officials in Tarsus and providing them with financial and military resources. This land military activity was paralleled by analogous naval operations conducted by the Tulunid navy. The Byzantines suffered defeats on land and at sea, compelling the Byzantine government to call upon its valiant commander Nikephoros II Phokas from Italy. Khamarawayh died without witnessing the full consequences of his extensive jihad. By the year 283 AH (896 CE), the Byzantines had opted for peace and sought a truce.

== List of rulers ==
1. Ahmad ibn Tulun, 868 – 884
2. Khumarawayh ibn Ahmad, 884 – 896
3. Jaysh ibn Khumarawayh, 896
4. Harun ibn Khumarawayh, 896 – 904
5. Shayban ibn Ahmad, 904 – 905

=== Family Tree ===
Tulunid Dynasty

Tulun
Ahmad r. 868–884
Khumarawayh r. 884–896	Shayban r. 904–905
Jaysh r. 896	Harun r. 896–904	Qatr al-Nada
