= Qatr al-Nada =

Wife of Abbasid caliph Al-Mu'tadid (died 900)

Qatr al-Nada قطر الندى

Consort of the Abbasid caliph
- Tenure: 3 March 895 – 8 July 900
- Born: Egypt
- Died: 8 July 900; Baghdad
- Burial: Caliphal palace of al-Rusafa
- Spouse: Al-Mu'tadid
Names
- Asma bint Khumarawayh ibn Ahmad ibn Tulun
- Father: Khumarawayh ibn Ahmad ibn Tulun
- Religion: Sunni Islam

Asma bint Khumarawayh ibn Ahmad ibn Tulun (Arabic: أسماء بنت خمارويه بن أحمد بن طولون), better known as Qatr al-Nada (Arabic: قطر الندى, romanized: Qaṭr al-Nadā, lit. 'Dew Drop'), was a daughter of Tulunid vassal ruler Khumarawayh ibn Ahmad and the principal wife of the sixteenth Abbasid caliph, al-Mu'tadid.

== Life ==
Qatr al-Nada was offered by her father, Khumarawayh ibn Ahmad ibn Tulun, as part of a marriage alliance to seal an agreement with the Caliph al-Mu'tadid. The agreement, concluded in spring 893, put an end to years of rivalry and fighting between the Tulunids and the Abbasid court, and recognized Khumarawayh as the hereditary ruler of Egypt and Syria, and autonomous from Baghdad, in exchange for an annual tribute.

Qatr al-Nada was originally intended for one of the Caliph's sons, Ali (the future al-Muktafi), but al-Mu'tadid chose to marry her himself. Qatr al-Nada brought with her a million gold dinars as her dowry, which according to the historian Thierry Bianquis was a "wedding gift that was considered the most sumptuous in medieval Arab history". The Caliph married her by proxy, the jewelry broker Abu Abdallah al-Jawhari ibn al-Jassas, while she was still in Egypt, and she was escorted from there to the Abbasid harem in Baghdad by Ibn al-Jassas and her paternal uncle Abu al-Karadis. She arrived in Baghdad on 3 March 895, an event marked by the luxury and extravagance of her retinue, which contrasted starkly with the impoverished caliphal court.

The 13th-century Baghdadi scholar Taj al-Din Ali ibn Anjab ibn al-Sa'i calls her "one of the most intelligent and regal women who ever lived", and records this anecdote of her wit: when her husband remarked that she had had the good fortune to have married the Caliph, and had no higher achievement to ask God for, she responded that the good fortune was al-Mu'tadid's, for their marriage made her father the Caliph's subject, and that he had nothing more to thank God for.

She died on 8 July 900, and was buried in the caliphal palace at al-Rusafa. In 906, one of her half-sisters, who had probably accompanied her to Baghdad, married al-Mu'tadid's son and successor al-Muktafi.

== See also ==
- Hurra bint Badr

== Sources ==
- Bianquis, Thierry (1998). "Autonomous Egypt from Ibn Ṭūlūn to Kāfūr, 868–969". In Petry, Carl F. (ed.). The Cambridge History of Egypt: Islamic Egypt, 640–1517. Vol. 1. Cambridge: Cambridge University Press. pp. 86–119. ISBN 0-521-47137-0.
- Ibn al-Sāʿī (2017). Consorts of the Caliphs: Women and the Court of Baghdad. Translated by Shawkat M. Toorawa. Introduction by Julia Bray, Foreword by Marina Warner. New York: New York University Press. ISBN 978-1-4798-0477-1.
- Rosenthal, Franz, ed. (1985). The History of al-Ṭabarī, Volume XXXVIII: The Return of the Caliphate to Baghdad: The Caliphates of al-Muʿtaḍid, al-Muktafī and al-Muqtadir, A.D. 892–915/A.H. 279–302. SUNY Series in Near Eastern Studies. Albany, New York: State University of New York Press. ISBN 978-0-87395-876-9.
- Sobernheim, Moritz (1987). "Khumārawaih". In Houtsma, Martijn Theodoor (ed.). E.J. Brill's First Encyclopaedia of Islam, 1913–1936, Volume IV: 'Itk–Kwaṭṭa. Leiden: Brill. p. 973. ISBN 978-90-04-08265-6.
