= Harun ibn Khumarawayh =

Tulunid Emir of Egypt from 896 to 904

Harun ibn Khumarawayh هارون بن خمارويه
- vassal Ruler of Egypt
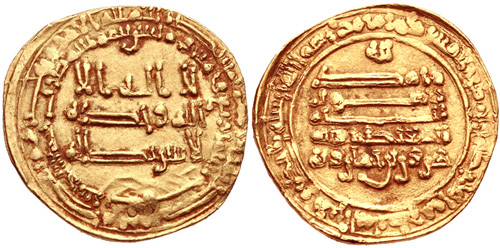
- Gold dinar under Harun's rule, minted in Aleppo in 896/7 CE, extremely rare coins
- Rule: 896–904
- Predecessor: Jaysh ibn Khumarawayh
- Successor: Shayban ibn Ahmad ibn Tulun
- Born: Egypt
- Died: 30 December 904; Egypt
- House: Tulunid
- Father: Khumarawayh ibn Ahmad ibn Tulun
- Religion: Islam

Harun ibn Khumarawayh (Arabic: هارون بن خمارويه; died 30 December 904) was the fourth Tulunid vassal Emir of Egypt (896–904). He succeeded his elder brother Abu 'l-Asakir Jaysh, who had been murdered by army chiefs. He left state affairs to the vizier, Abu Ja'far ibn Ali, preferring to live a life of dissolute luxury. This led to a growing crisis in the country, since state finances could not be regulated and the army leaders gradually accrued more power to themselves

After Khumarawayh's death, the Tulunids entered a period of instability under his under-age heirs, with his son Jaysh ibn Khumarawayh being deposed and killed in November, in favour of his younger brother Harun ibn Khumarawayh (896–904). al-Mu'tadid swiftly took advantage of this: in 897 he extended his control over the border provinces of the al-Thughur; forced the Tulunids to hand back all of Syria north of Homs; and increased the annual tribute to 450,000 dinars in exchange for caliphal recognition of Harun. Over the next few years, the Tulunid domains continued to experience domestic turmoil coupled with an escalation of Qarmatian attacks, resulting in the defection of many Tulunid followers to the resurgent Caliphate.

The Abbasid Caliphate took advantage of this state of affairs and invaded Tulunid-controlled Syria in 904. The Tulunid troops deserted, and the forces of the Caliphate were able to enter the Nile valley. Harun was killed in an army mutiny. His successor was the last of the Tulunids, his uncle Shayban (904–905).

== Sources ==
- Bonner, Michael (2010). "The Waning of Empire, 861–945". In Robinson, Chase F. (ed.). The New Cambridge History of Islam, Volume 1: The Formation of the Islamic World, Sixth to Eleventh Centuries. Cambridge: Cambridge University Press. pp. 305–359. ISBN 978-0-521-83823-8.
- Kennedy, Hugh (2004) [1986]. The Prophet and the Age of the Caliphates: The Islamic Near East from the 6th to the 11th Century (Second ed.). Harlow: Longman. ISBN 978-0-582-40525-7.

Preceded by Abu 'l-Asakir Jaysh	Tulunid Emir of Egypt; 896–904	Succeeded by Shayban
