= Shayban ibn Ahmad ibn Tulun =

10th-century Emir of Egypt

Shayban ibn Ahmad ibn Tulun شيبان بن أحمد بن طولون
- Ruler of Egypt
- Rule: 904 – 905
- Predecessor: Harun ibn Khumarawayh
- Born: Egypt
- Died: 904/05; Egypt, Abbasid Caliphate
- House: Tulunid
- Father: Ahmad ibn Tulun

Shayban ibn Ahmad ibn Tulun (شيبان بن أحمد بن طولون) was the fifth and last vassal Emir of the Tulunids in Egypt (904-905). In 904–905 al-Muktafi invaded Egypt and reincorporated the country fully into the Abbasid Empire.

Shayban was one of the son of Ahmad ibn Tulun, he succeeded his nephew Harun ibn Khumarawayh, who was killed in a mutiny in December 904 during the invasion of Egypt by the Abbasid Caliphate. After years of mismanagement, the emirate was beyond rescue - he was forced to retreat with his army to Fustat, where on 10 January 905 he surrendered unconditionally to the Abbasid commander Muhammad ibn Sulayman al-Katib, ending the rule of the Tulunids.

== Bibliography ==
- Kennedy, Hugh (2004) [1986]. The Prophet and the Age of the Caliphates: The Islamic Near East from the 6th to the 11th Century (Second ed.). Harlow: Longman. ISBN 978-0-582-40525-7.

Preceded by Harun ibn Khumarawayh	Tulunid Emir of Egypt; 904–905	Abbasid reconquest
