= Abu 'l-Asakir Jaysh ibn Khumarawayh =

Tulunid Emir of Egypt in 896

Abu 'l-Asakir Jaysh ibn Khumarawayh أبو العساكر جيش بن خمارويه
- Ruler of Egypt
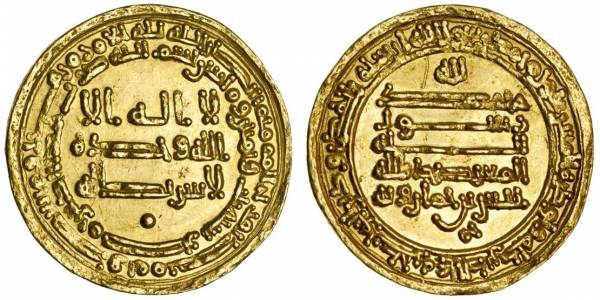
- Gold coin struck during the governorship of Jaysh ibn Khumarawayh in 283 AH; Third line: Caliph al-Mu'tadid; Fourth line: Jaysh ibn Khumarawayh
- Rule: January – November 896
- Predecessor: Khumarawayh ibn Ahmad ibn Tulun
- Successor: Harun ibn Khumarawayh
- Born: 882; Fustat, Egypt
- Died: November 896; Fustat, Egypt
- House: Tulunid
- Father: Khumarawayh ibn Ahmad ibn Tulun
- Religion: Islam

Abu 'l-Asakir Jaysh ibn Khumarawayh (Arabic: أبو العساكر جيش بن خمارويه; 882 – 896), born in Egypt, he was the third Emir of the Tulunids in Egypt, ruling briefly in 896.

== Life ==
His father, Khumarawayh, was killed on 18 January 896 by one of his servants, who had been conducting an affair with Khumarawayh's favourite wife. When Khumarawayh learned of this, the servant feared for his life, and organised a conspiracy which claimed the Tulunid ruler's life. After Khumarawayh's death, the Tulunid territory entered a period of instability under his under-age heirs, with his son Abu 'l-Asakir Jaysh.

The eldest son of Khumarawayh, he succeeded him early in 896 at the age of fourteen. Soon afterwards he ordered the execution of his uncle Mudar ibn Ahmad ibn Tulun. After ruling for only a few months, the faqihs and qadis declared him deposed and he was killed in November 896, along with his vizier Ali ibn Ahmad al-Madhara'i. He was replaced by his younger brother Harun.

== Sources ==
- Haarmann, Ulrich (1986). "K̲h̲umārawayh". In Bosworth, C. E.; van Donzel, E.; Lewis, B. & Pellat, Ch. (eds.). The Encyclopaedia of Islam, Second Edition. Volume V: Khe–Mahi. Leiden: E. J. Brill. pp. 49–50. ISBN 978-90-04-07819-2.
- Sobernheim, Moritz (1987). "Khumārawaih". In Houtsma, Martijn Theodoor (ed.). E.J. Brill's First Encyclopaedia of Islam, 1913–1936, Volume IV: 'Itk–Kwaṭṭa. Leiden: BRILL. p. 973. ISBN 90-04-08265-4.

Preceded by Khumarawayh ibn Ahmad	Tulunid Emir of Egypt; 896	Succeeded by Harun ibn Khumarawayh
