= Dinawari (disambiguation) =

Dinawari (Persian: دینوری, Arabic: الدينوري) is a toponymic surname (nisba) from the city of Dinavar, Iran and may refer to:

- Abū Ḥanīfa Dinawarī, a 9th-century Iranian polymath
- Ibn Qutayba Dinawari, a 9th-century Islamic scholar
- Mumshad Dinawari, a sufi
- Abū Muḥammad Dinawarī, a 9th-century Hafiz of Qur'an and a Hadith scholar
