= Abu'l-Abbas Ahmad ibn al-Furat =

Abu'l-ʿAbbās Aḥmad ibn Muḥammad ibn Mūsā ibn al-Ḥasan ibn al-Furāt (Arabic: أبو العباس أحمد بن العباس) a member of the Banu'l-Furat family, was a senior fiscal administrator for the Abbasid Caliphate and eventually head of the fiscal administration under the caliphs al-Mu'tadid and al-Muktafi, until his death in 904.

Ahmad's family had been of some prominence at Baghdad already in the early 9th century, but it was his father Muhammad ibn Musa who first occupied an important administrative post. Ahmad began his career alongside his brother Ali during the late caliphate of al-Mu'tamid (r. 870–892) and the regency of al-Muwaffaq. Both were protégés of the fellow Shi'ite Isma'il ibn Bulbul, who, after becoming vizier to both al-Mu'tamid and al-Muwaffaq in 885, brought them into the administration as fiscal experts and entrusted them with the department of land revenue of the Sawad. Following Ibn Bulbul's dismissal, Ahmad was imprisoned for a while, but at the accession of al-Mu'tadid (r. 892–902) in 892, he was released and entrusted once more with the fiscal department of the Sawad, and later of all the land tax departments, with Ali as his deputy.

The Ibn al-Furat brothers and their supporters came to form one of the two major groups that would dominate the Abbasid bureaucracy over the next decades, the Banu'l-Furat or Furatids. Their main rivals were another group of secretarial families, the Banu'l-Jarrah or Jarrahids, headed by Muhammad ibn Dawud and his nephew Ali ibn Isa al-Jarrah, who replaced the Banu'l-Furat as heads of the fiscal departments in 899. The two groups represented primarily different factions in a struggle for office and power, but there are indications of "ideological" differences as well: many of the Banu'l-Jarrah families hailed from converted Nestorian families and employed Christians in the bureaucracy, in addition to maintaining closer ties with the military, while the Banu'l-Furat tried to impose firm civilian control of the army and (not quite openly) favoured Shi'ism. The rivalry between the two groups was intense but mostly restrained, as their fortunes shifted repeatedly, but torture and the forced confiscation of a deposed official's possessions were commonplace under the old-established system known as muṣādara or muṭālaba, which forced deposed officials to return the money they had embezzled; in effect, however, it practically forced officials to embezzle while on office so as to be able to provide the requisite sums during the muṣādara inquest.

Ahmad continued to serve as head of the fiscal departments in the caliphate of al-Muktafi (r. 902–908), despite the hostility of al-Muktafi's vizier, al-Qasim ibn Ubayd Allah. Before the latter could move against Ahmad, the latter died in 904.

== Sources ==
- Bonner, Michael (2010). "The waning of empire, 861–945". In Robinson, Chase F. (ed.). The New Cambridge History of Islam, Volume 1: The Formation of the Islamic World, Sixth to Eleventh Centuries. Cambridge: Cambridge University Press. pp. 305–359. ISBN 978-0-521-83823-8.
- Kennedy, Hugh (2004). The Prophet and the Age of the Caliphates: The Islamic Near East from the 6th to the 11th Century (Second ed.). Harlow: Longman. ISBN 978-0-582-40525-7.
- Sourdel, D. (1971). "Ibn al-Furāt". In Lewis, B.; Ménage, V. L.; Pellat, Ch. & Schacht, J. (eds.). The Encyclopaedia of Islam, Second Edition. Volume III: H–Iram. Leiden: E. J. Brill. pp. 767–768. doi:10.1163/1573-3912_islam_COM_0322. OCLC 495469525.
