= Khumarawayh ibn Ahmad ibn Tulun =

Ruler of Egypt and Syria from 884 to 896

- Ruler of Egypt and Syria
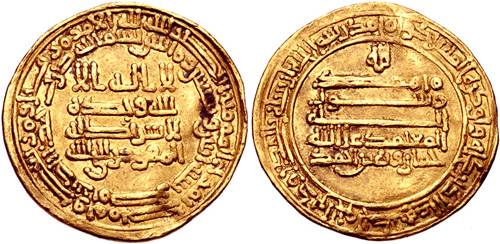
- Gold dinar of Khumarawayh, minted in 885/6 CE and bearing the names of Caliph al-Mu'tamid, al-Mufawwad, and al-Muwaffaq

Emir of Egypt and Syria
- Reign: 10 May 884 – 18 January 896
- Predecessor: Ahmad ibn Tulun
- Successor: Jaysh ibn Khumarawayh
- Born: 864; Samarra
- Died: 18 January 896 al-Qata'i
- Issue: Abu 'l-Asakir Jaysh; Harun; Qatr al-Nada
- Dynasty: Tulunid dynasty
- Father: Ahmad ibn Tulun
- Religion: Sunni Islam

Abu 'l-Jaysh Khumārawayh ibn Aḥmad ibn Ṭūlūn (Arabic: أبو الجيش خمارويه بن أحمد بن طولون; 864 – 18 January 896) was Emir of Egypt. He is the son of the founder of the Tulunid dynasty, Ahmad ibn Tulun. His father, the autonomous ruler of Egypt and Syria, designated him as his successor. When Ibn Tulun died in May 884, Khumarawayh succeeded him. After defeating an attempt to depose him, in 886 he managed to gain recognition of his rule over Egypt and Syria as a hereditary governor from the Abbasid Caliphate. In 893 the agreement was renewed with the new Abbasid Caliph, al-Mu'tadid, and sealed with the marriage of his daughter Qatr al-Nada to the Caliph.

At the height of his power, Khumarawayh's authority expanded from the Byzantine frontier in Cilicia and the Jazira to Nubia. Domestically, his reign was marked by a prodigal squandering of funds on extravagant displays of wealth, construction of palaces, and the patronage of artists and poets. In combination with the need to maintain a sizeable professional army and guarantee its loyalty through rich gifts, this emptied the treasury by the end of his reign. Khumarawayh was murdered by a palace servant in 896, and was succeeded by his son Jaysh, who was deposed after a few months in favour of another son, Harun ibn Khumarawayh. The Tulunid state entered a period of turmoil and weakness, which culminated in its reconquest by the Abbasids in 904–905.

== Biography ==
Khumarawayh was born at Samarra in 864. His father, Ahmad ibn Tulun, the son of a Turkish slave-soldier, was appointed governor of Egypt in 868. In 871 he expelled the caliphal fiscal agent and assumed direct control of Egypt's revenue, which he used to create an army of slave soldiers (ghilmān) of his own. Relying on this powerful force, and exploiting the rift between the increasingly powerless Caliph al-Mu'tamid and his brother and de facto regent al-Muwaffaq—in 882 al-Mu'tamid even tried to flee Samarra and seek refuge with Ibn Tulun—he managed to gain control over Syria and the frontier zone with the Byzantine Empire (the Thughūr), as well as parts of the Jazira up to Raqqa.

=== Succession and relations with the Abbasids ===
In 882, following a failed rebellion of his elder brother Abbas, who was "regarded as cruel and untrustworthy" (Moritz Sobernheim), Khumarawayh was named as his father's deputy in Egypt and heir-apparent. This position was confirmed by Ibn Tulun at the request of his generals shortly before his death on 10 May 884. With the backing of the Tulunid regime's elites, Khumarawayh's succession was smooth; Abbas was forced to acknowledge Khumarawayh, but was assassinated shortly after. Khumarawayh's accession was an important step in the gradual dissolution of the Abbasid Caliphate: as Thierry Bianquis explains, "this was the first time in Abbasid history with regard to the government of so large and rich a territory, that a wāli, whose legitimacy derived from the caliph who had designated him, was succeeded openly by an amīr who claimed his legitimacy by inheritance".

In his last months, Ibn Tulun had sought to effect a reconciliation with al-Muwaffaq on the basis of the recognition of his authority over Egypt and Syria, but his death interrupted the negotiations. As Khumarawayh was young and untested, one of Ibn Tulun's senior generals, Ahmad ibn Muhammad al-Wasiti, encouraged the Abbasids to attack and recover control of the Tulunid territories. The generals Ishaq ibn Kundaj and Ibn Abi'l-Saj attacked the Tulunid domains in Syria. Damascus fell when its governor defected, but their initial gains were rapidly reversed. In the spring of 885, al-Muwaffaq's son Abu'l-Abbas (the future al-Mu'tadid) was sent to take charge of the invasion. He soon succeeded in defeating the Tulunids and forcing them to retreat to Palestine, but after a quarrel with Ibn Kundaj and Ibn Abi'l-Saj, the latter abandoned the campaign and withdrew their forces. At the Battle of Tawahin on 6 April, Khumarawayh confronted Abu'l-Abbas in person. The Abbasid prince was initially victorious, forcing Khumarawayh to flee, but was in turn defeated by the Tulunid general Sa'd al-Aysar and fled the battlefield, while much of his army was taken prisoner. Al-Aysar then tried to rebel in Damascus, but Khumarawayh swiftly suppressed his revolt and is said to have killed the rebel with his own hands.

Khumarawayh continued to pursue a rapprochement with the Abbasid court: he treated the prisoners of war from Tawahin with exceptional clemency, giving them the choice of either staying in Egypt under his own service or returning to Iraq without ransom. This policy eventually led to the conclusion of an agreement in December 886, whereby Khumarawayh was recognized as governor over Egypt and Syria, with the right to be succeeded by his offspring, for a period of 30 years, in exchange for an unspecified annual tribute. Between 886 and 890, Khumarawayh went on to defeat Ibn Khundaj and receive the submission of the governor of the Jazira, Ibn Abi'l-Saj. At the same time, the governor of Tarsus, Yazaman al-Khadim, accepted Tulunid suzerainty, bringing the Cilician Thughūr under Tulunid control as well.

Map of the Tulunid domains towards the end of Khumarawayh's reign

The accession of al-Mu'tadid in 892 brought a warming of relations with the Baghdad court. Recognizing that he could not defeat the Tulunids, the new Caliph instead opted to conciliate them: in spring 893, al-Mu'tadid reconfirmed Khumarawayh in his office as autonomous governor over Egypt and Syria, in exchange for an annual tribute of 300,000 dinars and further 200,000 dinars in arrears, as well as the return to caliphal control of the two Jaziran provinces of Diyar Rabi'a and Diyar Mudar. In addition, the prestigious ṭirāz factories in Alexandria and Fustat, which produced government banners and robes of honour, remained under caliphal control. In order to seal the pact, Khumarawayh offered his daughter, Qatr al-Nada as bride to one of the Caliph's sons, but al-Mu'tadid chose to marry her himself. Her arrival in Baghdad was marked by the luxury and extravagance of her retinue, which contrasted starkly with the impoverished caliphal court. The Tulunid princess brought with her a million dinars as her dowry, a "wedding gift that was considered the most sumptuous in medieval Arab history" (Bianquis), and the lavish marriage ceremonies remained the stuff of folk legends in Egypt until well into the Ottoman period.

=== Domestic policies ===
The extravagant wedding shows Khumarawayh's famous frivolity with money—indeed it has been suggested that the whole affair was, in the words of the historian Ulrich Haarmann, "a calculated device on the part of the caliph to wreck the finances of his dangerously wealthy and powerful vassal". Eager to display his wealth, the Tulunid ruler also built numerous palaces for himself and his favourites, and engaged in famous displays of royal extravagance, such as a quicksilver-filled basin in which he was rocked to sleep on top of air-filled cushions, or the blue-eyed lion he kept as a pet at his court. In addition, according to the sources, Khumarawayh never rode the same horse twice. He was nevertheless also a generous patron of the arts, of scholars and of poets. One of his protégés was the grammarian Muhammad ibn Abdallah ibn Muhammad ibn Muslim, who was also tutor to his sons, while al-Qasim ibn Yahya al-Maryami wrote panegyrics in his honour. All of this came at a heavy price, however; by the time of his death, the Tulunid treasury (which reportedly had contained ten million gold dinars at the time of his accession) was empty, and the dinar had lost two-thirds of its value. His extravagance brought criticism from religious scholars and from contemporary and later historians alike.

Domestically, his reign was one of "luxury and decay" (Hugh N. Kennedy), but also a time of relative tranquillity in Egypt as well as in Syria, a rather unusual occurrence for the period. Khumarawayh's main power base was the powerful army built by his father, much in the model of the Abbasids themselves after the establishment of a professional military under Caliph al-Mu'tasim. The Tulunid army was mostly composed of Turkish, Byzantine Greek (Rūm), and black African (Sudān) ghilmān, as well as a few Byzantine mercenaries. To them Khumarawayh added a special regiment, the al-mukhtāra ("the elect, picked"), mostly drawn from the Bedouins of the eastern Nile Delta, an area of great importance as it controlled the route connecting Syria and Egypt. A thousand-strong unit made up of black Africans seems to have been a distinct sub-unit of the al-mukhtāra. Despite the undoubted military talent and personal bravery he displayed after Tawahin, Khumarawayh never enjoyed Ibn Tulun's authority over the army. This led to a policy of buying their loyalty with sumptuous donatives, which further drained the treasury. As Hugh N. Kennedy comments, financial difficulties seem to have been inherent in the Abbasid model the Tulunids emulated, resulting from the "inability of the state to fund a large, mostly inactive army on a permanent basis". In an attempt to find the necessary funds, the fiscal administration was entrusted to Ali ibn Ahmad al-Madhara'i, marking the final rise of the al-Madhara'i family to a dominant position in the fiscal and government apparatus of Egypt for the next half-century.

=== Death and succession ===
Khumarawayh was killed on 18 January 896 by one of his servants, who had been conducting an affair with Khumarawayh's favourite wife. When Khumarawayh learned of this, the servant feared for his life, and organized a conspiracy which claimed the Tulunid ruler's life. After Khumarawayh's death, the Tulunid state entered a period of instability under his under-age heirs, with his son Jaysh ibn Khumarawayh being deposed and killed in November, in favour of his younger brother Harun ibn Khumarawayh (r. 896–904). Al-Mu'tadid swiftly took advantage of this: in 897 he extended his control over the border provinces of the Thughūr; forced the Tulunids to hand back all of Syria north of Homs; and increased the annual tribute to 450,000 dinars in exchange for caliphal recognition of Harun. Over the next few years, the Tulunid domains continued to experience domestic turmoil coupled with an escalation of Qarmatian attacks, resulting in the defection of many Tulunid followers to the resurgent Caliphate. Finally, in 904–905 al-Mu'tadid's successor al-Muktafi invaded Egypt and reincorporated the country fully into the Abbasid empire.

== Sources ==
- Bianquis, Thierry (1998). "Autonomous Egypt from Ibn Ṭūlūn to Kāfūr, 868–969". In Petry, Carl F. (ed.). The Cambridge History of Egypt: Islamic Egypt, 640–1517. Vol. 1. Cambridge: Cambridge University Press. pp. 86–119. ISBN 0-521-47137-0.
- Bonner, Michael (2010). "The Waning of Empire, 861–945". In Robinson, Chase F. (ed.). The New Cambridge History of Islam, Volume 1: The Formation of the Islamic World, Sixth to Eleventh Centuries. Cambridge: Cambridge University Press. pp. 305–359. ISBN 978-0-521-83823-8.
- Haarmann, Ulrich (1986). "K̲h̲umārawayh". In Bosworth, C. E.; van Donzel, E.; Lewis, B. & Pellat, Ch. (eds.). The Encyclopaedia of Islam, Second Edition. Volume V: Khe–Mahi. Leiden: E. J. Brill. pp. 49–50. ISBN 978-90-04-07819-2.
- Kennedy, Hugh (2004) [1986]. The Prophet and the Age of the Caliphates: The Islamic Near East from the 6th to the 11th Century (Second ed.). Harlow: Longman. ISBN 978-0-582-40525-7.
- Sobernheim, Moritz (1987). "Khumārawaih". In Houtsma, Martijn Theodoor (ed.). E.J. Brill's First Encyclopaedia of Islam, 1913–1936, Volume IV: 'Itk–Kwaṭṭa. Leiden: BRILL. p. 973. ISBN 90-04-08265-4.

Preceded by Ahmad ibn Tulun	Tulunid Emir of Egypt; 10 May 884 – 18 January 896	Succeeded by Jaysh ibn Khumarawayh
