= Al-Mu'tadid =

16th Abbasid Caliph (r. 892–902)

Abū al-ʿAbbās Aḥmad Al-Muʿtaḍid bi'Llāh أبو العباس أحمد المعتضد بالله
- Khalifah; Amir al-Mu'minin
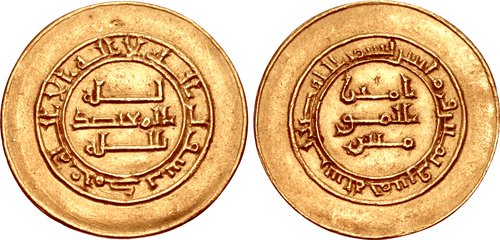
- Gold dinar of al-Mu'tadid, AH 285 (AD 892/3)

16th Caliph of the Abbasid Caliphate
- Reign: 15 October 892 – 5 April 902
- Predecessor: al-Mu'tamid
- Successor: al-Muktafi
- Born: c. 854 or c. 861; Samarra, Abbasid Caliphate
- Died: 5 April 902 (aged 41 or 48); Baghdad, Abbasid Caliphate
- Burial: Baghdad
- Consort: Qatr al-Nada
- Issue: al-Muktafi; al-Muqtadir; al-Qahir; Harun; Maymuna
Names
- Abū al-ʿAbbās Aḥmad ibn Ṭalḥa ibn Jaʿfar ibn Muḥammad ibn Hārūn Al-Muʿtaḍid bi'Llāh
- Dynasty: Abbasid
- Father: al-Muwaffaq
- Mother: Dirar
- Religion: Sunni Islam

Abū al-ʿAbbās Aḥmad ibn Ṭalḥa ibn Jaʿfar ibn Muḥammad ibn Hārūn (Note: Arabic: أبو العباس أحمد بن طلحة الموفق) (853/4 or 860/1 – 5 April 902), better known by his regnal name al-Muʿtaḍid bi-llāh (Note: Arabic: المعتضد بالله) (lit. 'Seeking Support in God'), was the caliph of the Abbasid Caliphate from 892 until his death in 902.

Al-Mu'tadid was the son of al-Muwaffaq, who was the regent and effective ruler of the Abbasid state during the reign of his brother, Caliph al-Mu'tamid. As a prince, the future al-Mu'tadid served under his father during various military campaigns, most notably in the suppression of the Zanj Rebellion, in which he played a major role. When al-Muwaffaq died in June 891 al-Mu'tadid succeeded him as regent. He quickly sidelined his cousin and heir-apparent al-Mufawwid; when al-Mu'tamid died in October 892, he succeeded to the throne. Like his father, al-Mu'tadid's power depended on his close relations with the army. These were first forged during the campaigns against the Zanj and were reinforced in later expeditions which the Caliph led in person: al-Mu'tadid would prove to be the most militarily active of all Abbasid caliphs. Through his energy and ability, he succeeded in restoring to the Abbasid state some of the power and provinces it had lost during the turmoil of the previous decades.

In a series of campaigns he recovered the provinces of Jazira, Thughur, and Jibal, and effected a rapprochement with the Saffarids in the east and the Tulunids in the west that secured their—albeit largely nominal—recognition of caliphal suzerainty. These successes came at the cost of gearing the economy almost exclusively towards the maintenance of the army, which resulted in the expansion and rise to power of the central fiscal bureaucracy and contributed to the Caliph's lasting reputation for avarice. Al-Mu'tadid was renowned for his cruelty when punishing criminals, and subsequent chroniclers recorded his extensive and ingenious use of torture. His reign saw the permanent move of the capital back to Baghdad, where he engaged in major building activities. A firm supporter of Sunni traditionalist orthodoxy, he nevertheless maintained good relations with the Alids, and was interested in natural sciences, renewing caliphal sponsorship of scholars and scientists.

Despite his successes, al-Mu'tadid's reign was ultimately too short to effect a lasting reversal of the Caliphate's fortunes, and the revival that he spearheaded was too dependent on the presence of capable personalities at the helm of the state. The brief reign of his less able son and heir, al-Muktafi, still saw some major gains, notably the annexation of the Tulunid domains, but his later successors lacked his energy, and new enemies appeared in the form of the Qarmatians. In addition, factionalism within the bureaucracy, which had become apparent during the later years of al-Mu'tadid's reign, would debilitate the Abbasid government for decades to come, eventually leading to the subjugation of the Caliphate by a series of military strongmen, culminating in the conquest of Baghdad by the Buyids in 946.

== Early life ==
Family tree of the Abbasid dynasty in the middle and late 9th century

Al-Mu'tadid was born Ahmad, the son of Talha, one of the sons of the Abbasid caliph al-Mutawakkil (r. 847–861), and a Greek slave named Dirar (died September 891, buried in al-Rusafa) The exact date of his birth is unknown; as he is variously recorded as being thirty-eight or thirty-one years old at the time of his accession, he was born around either 854 or 861. In 861, al-Mutawakkil was murdered by his Turkish guards in collusion with his oldest son al-Muntasir (r. 861–862). This began a period of internal turmoil, known as the "Anarchy at Samarra" from the site of the Caliphate's capital, which ended in 870 with the rise to the throne of Ahmad's uncle, al-Mu'tamid (r. 870–892). Real power however, had come to lie with the elite Turkish slave-soldiers (ghilmān) and with Ahmad's own father, Talha, who, as the Caliphate's main military commander, served as the chief intermediary between the caliphal government and the Turks. Assuming the honorific name al-Muwaffaq in the style of the caliphs, Talha soon became the effective ruler of the Caliphate, a position consolidated in 882 after a failed attempt by al-Mu'tamid to flee to Egypt led to his confinement in house arrest.

Caliphal authority in the provinces collapsed during the "Anarchy at Samarra", with the result that by the 870s the central government had lost effective control over most of the Caliphate outside the metropolitan region of Iraq. In the west, Egypt had fallen under the control of the Turkish slave-soldier Ahmad ibn Tulun, who also disputed control of Syria with al-Muwaffaq, while Khurasan and most of the Islamic East had been taken over by the Saffarids, a Persianate dynasty who replaced the Abbasids' loyal clients, the Tahirids. Most of the Arabian peninsula was likewise lost to local potentates, while in Tabaristan a radical Zaydi Shi'a dynasty took power. Even in Iraq, the rebellion of the Zanj, African slaves brought to work in the plantations of Lower Iraq, threatened Baghdad itself, and further south the Qarmatians were a nascent threat. Al-Muwaffaq's regency was thus a continuous struggle to save the tottering Caliphate from collapse. His attempts to recover control of Egypt and Syria from Ibn Tulun failed, with the latter even able to expand his territory and obtain recognition as a hereditary ruler, but he succeeded in preserving the core of the Caliphate in Iraq by repelling a Saffarid invasion aimed at capturing Baghdad, and by subduing the Zanj after a long struggle.

=== Campaigns against the Zanj and the Tulunids ===
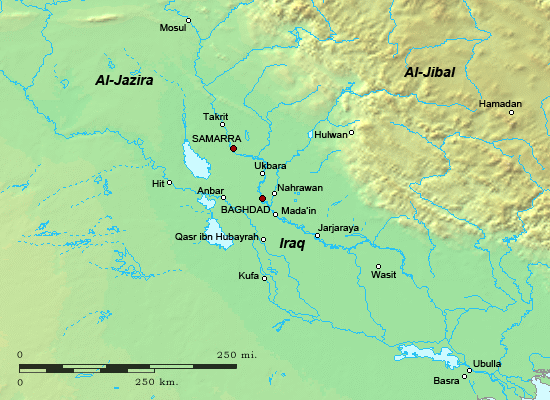
Map of the region of Iraq in the 9th–10th centuries

It was against the Zanj that the future al-Mu'tadid—at this time usually referred to by his kunya of Abu'l-Abbas—would acquire his first military experience and establish the close army ties that would characterize his reign. Al-Muwaffaq gave his son a military upbringing from an early age, and the young prince became an excellent rider and a solicitous commander, who showed personal attention to the state of his men and their horses.

Within a decade of the outbreak of the revolt in 869, the Zanj had seized most of lower Iraq, including the cities of Basra and Wasit, and expanded into Khuzistan. In 879 the death of the founder of the Saffarid state, Ya'qub al-Saffar, allowed the Abbasid government to fully concentrate its attention against the Zanj rebellion, and Abu'l-Abbas' appointment to command in December 879 at the head of 10,000 troops marks the turning point of the war. In the long and hard struggle that followed, which involved amphibious operations in the Mesopotamian Marshes, Abu'l-Abbas and his own ghilmān—of which the long-serving Zirak al-Turki was the most eminent—played the major role. Although the Abbasid armies eventually swelled with reinforcements, volunteers, and Zanj defectors, it was the few but elite ghilmān who formed the army's backbone, filling its leadership positions and bearing the brunt of the battle, often under the personal command of Abu'l-Abbas. After years of gradually tightening the noose around the Zanj, in August 883 the Abbasid troops stormed their capital of al-Mukhtara, putting an end to the rebellion. A detailed account of the war by a former Zanj rebel, preserved in the history written by al-Tabari, stresses the role of al-Muwaffaq and Abu'l-Abbas as the heroes who, in defence of the embattled Muslim state, suppressed the rebellion; the successful campaign would become a major tool in their propaganda effort to legitimize their de facto usurpation of the caliph's power.

Following the death of Ibn Tulun in May 884, the two caliphal generals Ishaq ibn Kundaj and Ibn Abu'l-Saj sought to take advantage of the situation and attacked the Tulunid domains in Syria, but their initial gains were rapidly reversed. In the spring of 885, Abu'l-Abbas was sent to take charge of the invasion. He soon succeeded in defeating the Tulunids and forcing them to retreat to Palestine, but after a quarrel with Ibn Kundaj and Ibn Abu'l-Saj, the latter two abandoned the campaign and withdrew their forces. In the Battle of Tawahin on 6 April, Abu'l-Abbas confronted Ibn Tulun's son and heir, Khumarawayh, in person. The Abbasid prince was initially victorious, forcing Khumarawayh to flee, but was in turn defeated and fled the battlefield, while much of his army was taken prisoner. After this victory the Tulunids expanded their control over the Jazira and the borderlands (the Thughur) with the Byzantine Empire. A peace agreement followed in 886, whereby al-Muwaffaq was forced to recognize Khumarawayh as hereditary governor over Egypt and Syria for 30 years, in exchange for an annual tribute. Over the next couple of years, Abu'l-Abbas was involved in his father's ultimately unsuccessful attempts to wrest Fars from Saffarid control.

=== Imprisonment and rise to the throne ===
During this period, relations between Abu'l-Abbas and his father deteriorated, although the reason is unclear. Already in 884, Abu'l-Abbas' ghilmān rioted in Baghdad against al-Muwaffaq's vizier, Sa'id ibn Makhlad, possibly over unpaid wages. Eventually, in 889, Abu'l-Abbas was arrested and put in prison on his father's orders, where he remained despite the demonstrations of the ghilmān loyal to him. He apparently remained under arrest until May 891, when al-Muwaffaq returned to Baghdad after two years spent in Jibal.

Al-Muwaffaq, suffering from gout, was clearly close to death; the vizier Isma'il ibn Bulbul and the city commander of Baghdad, Abu'l-Saqr, called al-Mu'tamid and his sons, including the heir-apparent al-Mufawwad, into the city, hoping to exploit the situation for their own purposes. This attempt to sideline Abu'l-Abbas failed due to his popularity with the soldiers and the common people. He was set free to visit his father's deathbed, and was able to immediately assume power when al-Muwaffaq died on 2 June. The Baghdad mob ransacked his opponents' houses, and Ibn Bulbul was dismissed and thrown in prison, where he died from maltreatment after a few months. Similar fates awaited any of Ibn Bulbul's supporters who were caught by Abu'l-Abbas's agents.

Now "all-powerful", Abu'l-Abbas succeeded his father in all his offices, with the title of al-Mu'tadid bi-llah and a position in the line of succession after the Caliph and al-Mufawwad. Within a few months, on 30 April 892, al-Mu'tadid had his cousin removed from the succession altogether. Thus, when al-Mu'tamid died on 14 October 892, al-Mu'tadid took power as caliph.

== Reign ==
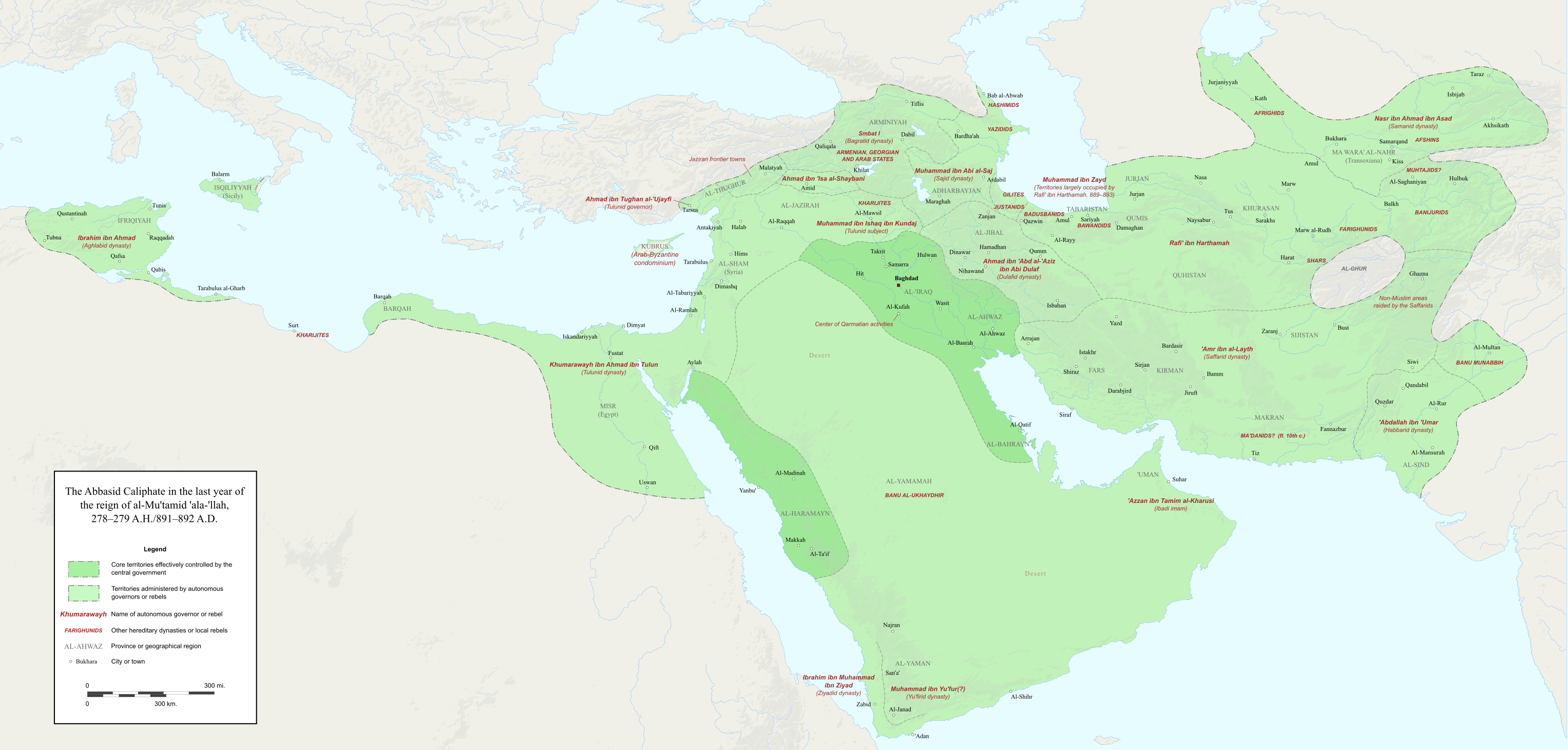
Map of the fragmented Abbasid empire at the start of al-Mu'tadid's reign, with areas still under direct control of the Abbasid central government (dark green) and under autonomous rulers (light green) adhering to nominal Abbasid suzerainty

The Orientalist Harold Bowen described al-Mu'tadid at his accession as follows:

in appearance upright and thin; and on his head was a white mole, which, since white moles were not admired, he used to dye black. His expression was haughty. In character he was brave—a story was told of his killing a lion with only a dagger. [...] he had inherited all his father's energy, and cultivated a reputation of prompt action.

Like his father's, al-Mu'tadid's power rested on his close relations with the military. As the historian Hugh N. Kennedy writes, he "came to the throne, essentially, as a usurper [...] not by any legal right, but because of the support of his ghilmān, who ensured not only that he became caliph, but also that their rivals in the military were humiliated and disbanded". Thus, not surprisingly, military activities consumed his interest, especially as he usually led his army in person on campaign. This secured his reputation as a warrior-caliph and champion of the Islamic faith ghazī); as the historian Michael Bonner comments, "[t]he role of 'ghazī caliph', invented by Harun al-Rashid and enhanced by al-Mu'tasim, now had its greatest performance, in al-Mu'tadid's tireless campaigning".

From the start of his reign, the new Caliph set out to reverse the fragmentation of the Abbasid Caliphate, a goal towards which he worked with a mixture of force and diplomacy. Although an active and enthusiastic campaigner, al-Mu'tadid was also "a skilful diplomat, always prepared to make compromises with those who were too powerful to defeat", according to Kennedy.

=== Relations with the Tulunids ===
This policy became immediately evident in the conciliatory attitude the new Caliph adopted towards his most powerful vassal, the Tulunid regime. In spring 893, al-Mu'tadid recognized and reconfirmed Khumarawayh in his office as autonomous emir over Egypt and Syria, in exchange for an annual tribute of 300,000 dinars and a further 200,000 dinars in arrears, as well as the return to caliphal control of the two Jaziran provinces of Diyar Rabi'a and Diyar Mudar. To seal the pact, Khumarawayh offered his daughter, Qatr al-Nada ("Dew Drop") as bride to one of the Caliph's sons, but al-Mu'tadid chose to marry her himself. The Tulunid princess brought with her a million dinars as her dowry, a "wedding gift that was considered the most sumptuous in medieval Arab history" (Thierry Bianquis). Her arrival in Baghdad was marked by the luxury and extravagance of her retinue, which contrasted starkly with the impoverished caliphal court. According to a story, after a thorough search, al-Mu'tadid's chief eunuch could find only five ornate silver-and-gold candlesticks to decorate the palace, while the princess was accompanied by 150 servants each carrying such a candlestick. Thereupon al-Mu'tadid is said to have remarked "come let us go and hide ourselves, lest we be seen in our poverty".

On the other hand, the whole affair may have been deliberately plotted by al-Mu'tadid as a "financial trap", as the enormous dowry almost bankrupted the Tulunid treasury. Apart from the honour of being linked to the caliphal dynasty, the Tulunids received little in return: Qatr al-Nada died soon after the wedding, and the murder of Khumarawayh in 896 left the Tulunid state in the unsteady hands of Khumarawayh's under-age sons. Al-Mu'tadid swiftly took advantage of this and in 897 extended his control over the border emirates of the Thughur, where, in the words of Michael Bonner, "[he] assumed, after a long hiatus, the old caliphal prerogative of commanding the annual summer expedition and arranging the defence against the Byzantine Empire". In addition, to secure caliphal recognition of his position, the new Tulunid ruler Harun ibn Khumarawayh (r. 896–904) was forced into further concessions, handing back all of Syria north of Homs, and increasing the annual tribute to 450,000 dinars. Over the next few years, increasing domestic turmoil in the remaining Tulunid domains, and the escalation of Qarmatian attacks, encouraged many Tulunid followers to defect to the resurgent Caliphate.

=== Jazira, Transcaucasia, and the Byzantine front ===
Map of the Jazira (Upper Mesopotamia), with its provinces, in medieval times; modern borders are also shown.

In the Jazira the new Caliph struggled against a variety of opponents: alongside an almost thirty-year-old Kharijite rebellion, there were various autonomous local magnates, chiefly the Shaybani ruler of Amid and Diyar Bakr, Ahmad ibn Isa al-Shaybani, and the Taghlibi chief Hamdan ibn Hamdun. In 893, while the Kharijites were distracted by internal quarrels, al-Mu'tadid captured Mosul from the Shayban. In 895 Hamdan ibn Hamdun was evicted from his strongholds, hunted down and captured. Finally, the Kharijite leader Harun ibn Abdallah himself was defeated and captured by Hamdan's son Husayn in 896, before being sent to Baghdad, where he was crucified. This exploit marked the beginning of an illustrious career for Husayn ibn Hamdan in the caliphal armies, and the gradual rise of the Hamdanid family to power in the Jazira. Ahmad al-Shaybani retained Amid until his death in 898, being succeeded by his son Muhammad. In the next year, al-Mu'tadid returned to the Jazira, ousted Muhammad from Amid, and reunified the entire province under central government control by installing his oldest son and heir, Ali al-Muktafi, as governor.

Al-Mu'tadid was unable, however, to restore effective caliphal control north of the Jazira in Transcaucasia, where Armenia and Adharbayjan remained in the hands of virtually independent local dynasties. Ibn Abu'l-Saj, who was now the caliphal governor of Adharbayjan, proclaimed himself independent around 898, although he soon re-recognized the Caliph's suzerainty during his conflicts with the Christian Armenian princes. When he died in 901, he was succeeded by his son Devdad, marking the consolidation of the semi-independent Sajid dynasty in the region. In 900, Ibn Abu'l-Saj was even suspected of plotting to seize Diyar Mudar province with the co-operation of the notables of Tarsus, after which the vengeful Caliph ordered the latter arrested and the city's fleet burned. This decision was a self-inflicted handicap in the centuries-long war against Byzantium; in recent decades the Tarsians and their fleet had played a major role in the raids against the Byzantine frontier provinces. While a Syrian fleet under the Byzantine convert to Islam Damian of Tarsus sacked the port of Demetrias around 900, and Arab fleets would go on to wreak havoc in the Aegean Sea over the next two decades, the Byzantines were strengthened on land by an influx of Armenian refugees, such as Melias. The Byzantines began to expand their control over the border regions, scoring victories and founding new provinces (themes) in the former no-man's land between the two empires.

=== The East and the Saffarids ===
In the Islamic East, the Caliph was forced to acknowledge the reality of the Saffarids' domination and established a modus vivendi with them, perhaps hoping, according to Kennedy, to harness them in a partnership analogous to that which the Tahirids had enjoyed in previous decades. Consequently, the Saffarid ruler Amr ibn al-Layth was recognized in his possession of Khurasan and eastern Persia as well as Fars, while the Abbasids were to exercise direct control over western Persia, namely Jibal, Rayy and Isfahan. This policy gave the Caliph a free hand to recover the territories of the Dulafids, another semi-independent local dynasty, that were centred on Isfahan and Nihavand. When the Dulafid Ahmad ibn Abd al-Aziz ibn Abi Dulaf died in 893, al-Mu'tadid moved swiftly to install his son al-Muktafi as governor in Rayy, Qazvin, Qum and Hamadan. The Dulafids were confined to their core region around Karaj and Isfahan, before being deposed outright in 896. Nevertheless, the Abbasid hold over these territories remained precarious, especially due to the proximity of the Zaydi emirate in Tabaristan, and in 897 Rayy was handed over to Saffarid control.

The Abbasid–Saffarid partnership in Iran was most clearly expressed in their joint effort against the general Rafi ibn Harthama, who had made his base in Rayy and posed a threat to both caliphal and Saffarid interests in the region. Al-Mu'tadid sent Ahmad ibn Abd al-Aziz to seize Rayy from Rafi, who fled and made common cause with the Zaydis of Tabaristan in an effort to seize Khurasan from the Saffarids. However, with Amr mobilizing the anti-Alid sentiments of the populace against him and the expected assistance from the Zaydis failing to materialize, Rafi was defeated and killed in Khwarazm in 896. Amr, now at the pinnacle of his power, sent the defeated rebel's head to Baghdad, and in 897 the Caliph transferred control of Rayy to him. The partnership finally collapsed after al-Mu'tadid appointed Amr as governor of Transoxiana in 898, which was ruled by his rivals, the Samanids. Al-Mu'tadid deliberately encouraged Amr to confront the Samanids, only for Amr to be crushingly defeated and taken prisoner by them in 900. The Samanid ruler, Isma'il ibn Ahmad, sent him in chains to Baghdad, where he was executed in 902, after al-Mu'tadid's death. Al-Mu'tadid in turn conferred Amr's titles and governorships on Isma'il ibn Ahmad. The Caliph also moved to regain Fars and Kirman, but the Saffarid remnant under Amr's grandson Tahir proved sufficiently resilient to thwart the Abbasid attempts to capture these provinces for several years. It was not until 910 that the Abbasids managed to regain the coveted Fars province.

=== Rise of sectarianism and fragmentation in the periphery ===
In the course of the 9th century, a range of new movements emerged, based on Shi'ite doctrines, which replaced Kharijism as the main focus for opposition to the established regimes. They gained their first successes in the periphery of the Abbasid empire: the Zaydi takeover in Tabaristan was repeated in 897 in Yemen. Under al-Mu'tadid, a new danger appeared closer to the Caliphate's metropolitan areas: the Qarmatians. A radical Isma'ili sect founded in Kufa around 874, the Qarmatians were originally a sporadic and minor nuisance in the Sawad (Lower Iraq), but their power grew swiftly to alarming proportions after 897. Under the leadership of Abu Sa'id al-Jannabi, they seized Bahrayn in 899 and in the next year defeated a caliphal army under al-Abbas ibn Amr al-Ghanawi. In the years following al-Mu'tadid's death, the Qarmatians "were to prove the most dangerous enemies the Abbasids had faced since the time of the Zanj" (Kennedy). At the same time, a Kufan Isma'ili missionary, Abu Abdallah al-Shi'i, made contact with the Kutama Berbers during a pilgrimage to Mecca. His proselytization efforts made rapid headway among them, and in 902, he began attacks on the Aghlabid emirate of Ifriqiya, clients of the Abbasids. Its conquest was completed in 909, laying the foundations of the Fatimid Caliphate.

=== Domestic government ===
==== Fiscal policies ====
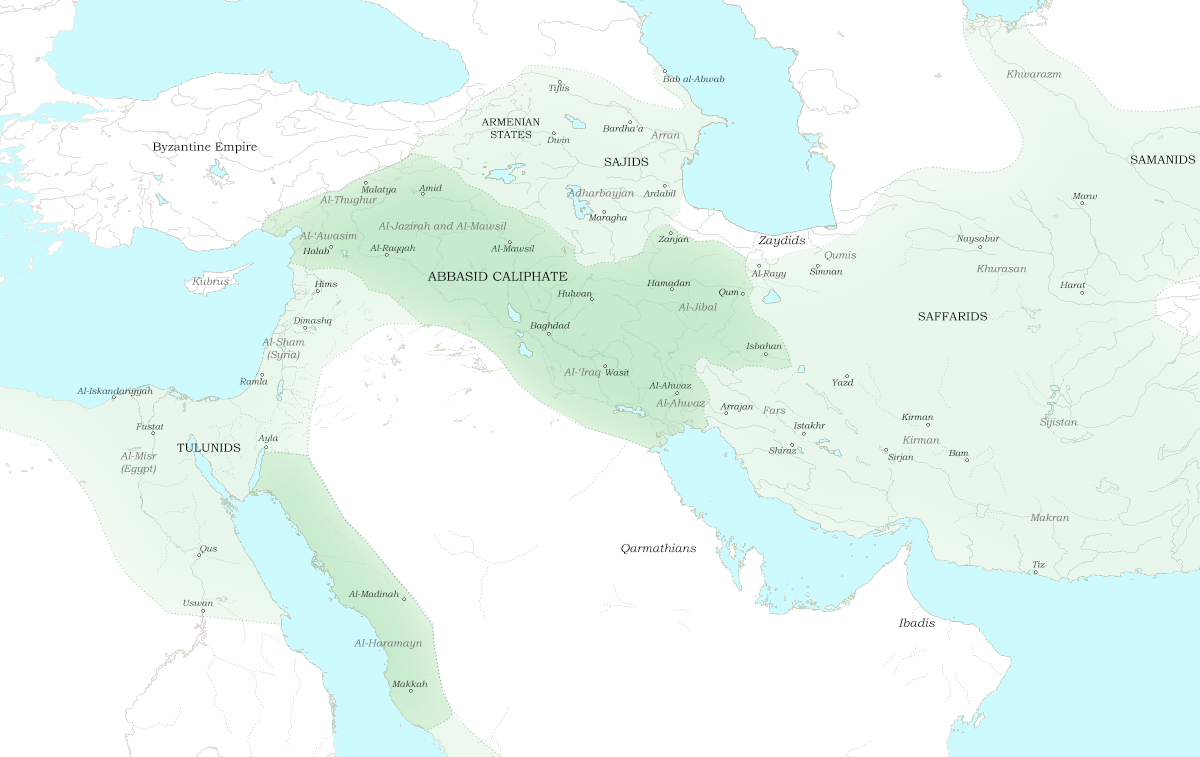
Map showing the result of al-Mu'tadid's campaigns of consolidation, c. 900: areas under direct Abbasid control in dark green, areas under loose Abbasid suzerainty, but under autonomous governors, in light green

The Abbasid army, following the reforms of al-Mu'tasim, was a smaller and more professional fighting force than the caliphal armies of the past. Although it proved effective militarily, it also posed a potential danger to the stability of the Abbasid regime: drawn from Turks and other peoples from the Caliphate's periphery and the lands beyond, it was alienated from the society of the Caliphate's heartlands, with the result that the soldiers were "entirely reliant on the state not just for cash but for their very survival" (Kennedy). As a result, any failure by the central government to provide their pay resulted in a military uprising and a political crisis; this had been repeatedly demonstrated during the Anarchy at Samarra. Consequently, ensuring the regular payment of the army became the prime task of the state. According to Kennedy, based on a treasury document from the time of al-Mu'tadid's accession:

out of the total expenditure of 7915 dinars per day, some 5121 are entirely military, 1943 in areas (like riding animals and stables) which served both military and non-military and only 851 in areas like the bureaucracy and the harem which can be described as truly civilian (though even in this case, the bureaucrats' main purpose seems to have been to arrange the payment of the army). It seems reasonable to conclude that something over 80 per cent of recorded government expenditure was devoted to maintaining the army.

At the same time, the Caliphate's fiscal basis had shrunk dramatically after so many tax-paying provinces were lost from the central government's control. The caliphal government was now increasingly reliant on the revenue of the Sawad and the other areas of lower Iraq, which were witnessing a rapid decline in agricultural productivity due to the disruption of the civil wars and neglect of the irrigation network. In the reign of Harun al-Rashid (786–809) the Sawad had provided an annual revenue of 102,500,000 dirhams, more than double the revenue of Egypt and three times that of Syria; by the early 10th century it was providing less than a third of that figure. The situation was further exacerbated by the fact that in the remaining provinces, semi-autonomous governors, grandees and members of the dynasty were able to establish virtual latifundia, aided by the system of muqāṭa'a, a form of tax farming in exchange for a fixed tribute, which they often failed to pay. To maximize their revenue from the territory remaining to them, the Abbasids increased the breadth and complexity of the central bureaucracy, dividing the provinces into smaller tax districts as well as increasing the number of the fiscal departments (dīwāns), which allowed for close oversight of both revenue collection and the activities of the officials themselves.

To combat this fiscal crisis, the Caliph would often personally devote himself to the supervision of revenue, acquiring a reputation, according to F. Malti-Douglas, for "a spirit of economy, verging on avarice"; he was said to "examine petty accounts that a commoner would scorn to consider" (Harold Bowen). Fines and confiscations multiplied under his rule, with the resulting revenue, along with the income from the crown domain and even a portion of the provincial taxation, flowing to the caliphal privy purse (bayt al-māl al-khāṣṣa). The latter now acquired a leading role among the fiscal departments, and it frequently held more money than the public treasury (bayt al-māl al-ʿāmma). By the end of al-Mu'tadid's reign, the once empty privy purse would contain ten million dinars. On the other hand, in a measure aimed to ease the tax burden of the farmers, in 895 the Caliph changed the start of the tax year from the Persian New Year in March to 11 June—which became known as Nayrūz al-Muʿtaḍid, 'al-Mu'tadid's New Year'—so the land tax (kharāj) was now collected after the harvest and reflected the actual yields, instead of the usually unreliable estimates before.

==== Rise of the bureaucracy ====
During the 9th century, the Abbasid administrative system became increasingly professionalized. The provincial administration became a subject of careful study, with geographical works such as those of Ibn Khordadbeh providing details on the Caliphate's provinces and their road networks, while men like Ibn Qutayba developed the art of chancery writing into a highly elaborate system. Al-Mu'tadid's fiscal policies further strengthened the position of the civil bureaucracy, which now reached the apogee of its influence, and especially that of the vizier, whom even the army came to respect as the spokesman of the caliph. Al-Mu'tadid also introduced Tuesday and Friday as days of rest for government employees.

In terms of personnel, al-Mu'tadid's reign was marked by continuity among the senior leadership of the state. Ubayd Allah ibn Sulayman ibn Wahb remained vizier from the start of the reign until his death in 901, and was succeeded by his son, al-Qasim, who had from the start been deputizing for his father during the latter's absences from the capital. The freedman Badr, a veteran who had served under al-Muwaffaq and whose daughter married the Caliph's son, remained commander of the army. The fiscal departments, especially of the Sawad, were managed first by the Banu'l-Furat brothers Ahmad and Ali, and after 899 by the Banu'l-Jarrah under Muhammad ibn Dawud and his nephew, Ali ibn Isa. The original administrative team was so effective and harmonious, according to the 11th-century historian Hilal as-Sabi, that it was said by subsequent generations that "there had never been such a quartet, Caliph, Vizier, Commander, and chief of the diwāns, as al-Mu'tadid, Ubayd Allah, Badr and Ahmad ibn al-Furat".

On the other hand, as Michel Bonner points out, the later reign of al-Mu'tadid "saw a growth of factionalism within this bureaucracy, observable also in the army and in urban civilian life". The intense rivalry between the two bureaucratic dynasties of the Banu'l-Furat and the Banu'l-Jarrah, with their extensive networks of clients, began at this time. Although a strong caliph and vizier could restrain this antagonism, it would come to dominate the Abbasid government during the following decades, with the factions alternating in office and often fining and torturing their predecessors to extract money according to the well-established practice known as muṣādara. In addition, al-Qasim ibn Ubayd Allah was of an altogether different character than his father: soon after his appointment to the vizierate, al-Qasim plotted to have al-Mu'tadid assassinated, and tried to involve Badr in his scheming. The general rejected his proposals with indignation, but al-Qasim was saved from discovery and execution by the Caliph's sudden death. The Vizier then tried to dominate al-Muktafi, moved swiftly to have Badr denounced and executed, and was involved in yet more intrigues against the Banu'l-Furat.

==== Return of the capital to Baghdad ====
Al-Mu'tadid also completed the return of the capital from Samarra to Baghdad, which had already served as his father's main base of operations. The city's centre, however, was relocated on the eastern bank of the Tigris and further downstream from the original Round City founded by al-Mansur (r. 754–775) a century earlier; it has remained there up to modern times. As the 10th-century historian al-Mas'udi wrote, the Caliph's two main passions were "women and building" ("al-nisāʿ waʿl-banāʿ"), and accordingly he engaged in major building activities in the capital: he restored and expanded the Great Mosque of al-Mansur which had fallen into disuse; enlarged the Hasani Palace; built the new palaces of Thurayya ('Pleiades') and Firdus ('Paradise'); and began work on the Taj ('Crown') Palace, which was completed under al-Muktafi. This marked the creation of a sprawling new caliphal palace complex, the Dar al-Khilafa, which would remain the residence of the Abbasid caliphs until the Mongol sack of the city in 1258. Al-Mu'tadid also took care to restore the city's irrigation network by clearing the silted-up Dujayl Canal, paying for this with money from those landowners who stood to profit from it.

==== Theological doctrines and promotion of science ====
In terms of doctrine, al-Mu'tadid sided firmly with Sunni traditionalist orthodoxy from the outset of his reign, forbidding theological works and abolishing the fiscal department responsible for property in escheat, which Hanbali legal opinion regarded as illegal. At the same time he also tried to maintain good relations with the Alids, to the point of seriously considering ordering the official cursing of Mu'awiya, the founder of the Umayyad Caliphate and main opponent of Ali; he was dissuaded only at the last moment by his advisers, who feared any unforeseen consequences such an act might have. Al-Mu'tadid also maintained good relations with the breakaway Zaydi imams of Tabaristan, but his pro-Alid stance failed to prevent the establishment of a second Zaydi state in Yemen in 901.

Al-Mu'tadid also actively promoted the traditions of learning and science that had flourished under his early 9th-century predecessors al-Ma'mun (r. 813–832), al-Mu'tasim, and al-Wathiq (r. 842–847). Court patronage for scientific endeavours had declined under al-Mutawakkil, whose reign had marked a return to Sunni orthodoxy and an aversion to scientific inquiry, while his successors had lacked the luxury to engage in intellectual pursuits. Himself "keenly interested in natural sciences" and able to speak Greek, al-Mu'tadid promoted the career of one of the great translators of Greek texts and mathematicians of the era, Thabit ibn Qurra, and of the grammarians Ibn Durayd and al-Zajjaj, the latter of whom became tutor of the Caliph's children. Other notable figures associated with, and supported by, the Abbasid court at the time were the religious scholar Ibn Abi al-Dunya, who served as the Caliph's advisor and was appointed as tutor for al-Muktafi; the translator Ishaq ibn Hunayn; the physician Abu Bakr al-Razi (Rhazes), who was named director of the newly established al-Mu'tadidi hospital in Baghdad; and the mathematician and astronomer al-Battani.

One of the leading intellectual figures of the period was al-Mu'tadid's own tutor, Ahmad ibn al-Tayyib al-Sarakhsi, a pupil of the great philosopher al-Kindi. Al-Sarakhsi became a close companion of the Caliph, who appointed him to the lucrative post of market supervisor of Baghdad, but was executed in 896, after angering the Caliph. According to one account, al-Qasim ibn Ubayd Allah—who is frequently featured as the villain in anecdotes of al-Mu'tadid's court—inserted al-Sarakhsi's name in a list of rebels to be executed; the Caliph signed the list, and learned of his mistake only after his old master had been executed.

==== Justice and punishment under al-Mu'tadid ====
In the dispensation of justice, al-Mu'tadid was characterized by what Malti-Douglas describes as "severity bordering on sadism". While tolerant of error and not above displays of sentimentality and tenderness, when his wrath was aroused he resorted to torture in the most ingenious ways, and had special torture chambers constructed underneath his palace. Chroniclers such as al-Mas'udi and the Mamluk-era historian al-Safadi describe in great detail the tortures inflicted by the Caliph on prisoners, as well as his practice of making an example of them by having them publicly displayed in Baghdad. Thus the Caliph is reported to have used bellows to inflate his prisoners, or buried them upside down in pits. At the same time, chroniclers justify his severity as legitimate, being in the interests of the state. Malti-Douglas remarks that when al-Safadi compared al-Mu'tadid with the founder of the Abbasid state, calling him "al-Saffah the Second", this was not only to emphasize his restoration of the Caliphate's fortunes, but also a direct allusion to the meaning of al-Saffah's name, "the Blood-Shedder".

== Death and legacy ==
Al-Mu'tadid died at the Hasani Palace on 5 April 902, at the age of either 40 or 47. There were rumours he had been poisoned, but it is more likely that the rigours of his campaigns, coupled with his dissolute life, severely weakened his health. During his final illness, he refused to follow the advice of his physicians, and even kicked one of them to death. He left behind him four sons and several daughters. Of his sons, three—al-Muktafi, al-Muqtadir, and al-Qahir—would rule as caliphs in turn and only one, Harun, did not become caliph. Al-Mu'tadid was the first Abbasid caliph to be buried within the city of Baghdad. Like his sons after him, he was buried in the former Tahirid Palace in the western part of the city, which was now used by the caliphs as a secondary residence.

When the Caliphate came to Mu'tadid, discord ceased, the provinces once again became obedient, war stopped, prices fell and turmoil simmered down. The rebels submitted to the new Caliph, his power was confirmed by victory, east and west recognized him, most of his adversaries and those who contested with him for power paid tribute to his authority.

— al-Mas'udi (896–956), The Meadows of Gold

According to the Orientalist Karl Vilhelm Zetterstéen, al-Mu'tadid "had inherited his father's gifts as a ruler and was distinguished alike for his economy and his military ability", becoming "one of the greatest of the Abbasids in spite of his strictness and cruelty". Al-Mu'tadid's capable reign is credited with having arrested the Abbasid Caliphate's decline for a while, but his successes were too dependent on the presence of an energetic ruler at the helm, and ultimately his reign "was too short to reverse long-term trends and re-establish Abbasid power on a long-term basis" (Kennedy).

Al-Mu'tadid had taken care to prepare his son and successor, al-Muktafi, for his role by appointing him as governor in Rayy and the Jazira. Although al-Muktafi tried to follow his father's policies, he lacked his energy. The heavily militarized system of al-Muwaffaq and al-Mu'tadid required the Caliph to actively participate in campaigns, setting a personal example and forming ties of loyalty, reinforced by patronage, between the ruler and the soldiers. Al-Muktafi, on the other hand, did not "in his character and comportment [...], being a sedentary figure, instil much loyalty, let alone inspiration, in the soldiers" (Michael Bonner). The Caliphate was still able to secure major successes over the next few years, including the reincorporation of the Tulunid domains in 904 and victories over the Qarmatians, but with al-Muktafi's death in 908, the so-called "Abbasid restoration" passed its high-water mark, and a new period of crisis began.

Power was now wielded by the senior bureaucrats, who installed the weak and pliable al-Muqtadir on the throne. Over the next decades, the expenditure of both the court and the army increased, while maladministration increased and strife between military and bureaucratic factions intensified. By 932, when al-Muqtadir was assassinated, the Caliphate was effectively bankrupt, and authority soon devolved on a series of military strongmen who competed for control of the caliph and the title of amīr al-umarāʾ. This process culminated in the capture of Baghdad in 946 by the Buyids, who put an end to caliphal independence even in name. Thereafter the caliphs remained as symbolic figureheads, but were divested of any military or political authority or independent financial resources.

== Family ==
Al-Mu'tadid's only wife was Qatr al-Nada. His sons were the offspring of concubines, such as Jijak, a Turkish-born slave who was the mother of al-Muktafi, the Greek-born Shaghab—who had previously belonged to a daughter of Muhammad ibn Abdallah ibn Tahir, the Tahirid governor of Baghdad in 851–867—and was the mother of Caliph al-Muqtadir, Fitna, mother of Caliph al-Qahir, and Dastanbuwayh, who was probably the mother of Mu'tadid's son, Harun, who died in 967. Al-Mu'tadid also had a daughter named Maymuna, who died in 921.

== Sources ==
- Bianquis, Thierry (1998). "Autonomous Egypt from Ibn Ṭūlūn to Kāfūr, 868–969". In Petry, Carl F. (ed.). The Cambridge History of Egypt: Islamic Egypt, 640–1517. Vol. 1. Cambridge: Cambridge University Press. pp. 86–119. ISBN 0-521-47137-0.
- Bonner, Michael (2010). "The waning of empire, 861–945". In Robinson, Chase F. (ed.). The New Cambridge History of Islam, Volume 1: The Formation of the Islamic World, Sixth to Eleventh Centuries. Cambridge: Cambridge University Press. pp. 305–359. ISBN 978-0-521-83823-8.
- Bosworth, C. E. (1975). "The Ṭāhirids and Ṣaffārids". In Frye, Richard N. (ed.). The Cambridge History of Iran: From the Arab Invasion to the Saljuqs. Vol. 4. Cambridge: Cambridge University Press. pp. 90–135. ISBN 0-521-20093-8.
- Bowen, Harold (1928). The Life and Times of ʿAlí Ibn ʿÍsà, ‘The Good Vizier’. Cambridge: Cambridge University Press.
- Donner, Fred M. (1999). "Muhammad and the Caliphate: Political History of the Islamic Empire up to the Mongol Conquest". In Esposito, John L. (ed.). The Oxford History of Islam. New York and Oxford: Oxford University Press. pp. 1–62. ISBN 978-0195107999.
- El-Azhari, Taef (2019). Queens, Eunuchs, and Concubines in Islamic History, 661-1257. Edinburgh: Edinburgh University Press. ISBN 978-1-4744-2319-9.
- El Cheikh, Nadia Maria (2013). "The Harem". Crisis and Continuity at the Abbasid Court: Formal and Informal Politics in the Caliphate of al-Muqtadir (295-320/908-32). Leiden: BRILL. pp. 165–185. ISBN 978-90-04-25271-4.
- El-Hibri, Tayeb (2021). The Abbasid Caliphate: A History. Cambridge and New York: Cambridge University Press. ISBN 978-1-107-18324-7.
- Fields, Philip M., ed. (1987). The History of al-Ṭabarī, Volume XXXVII: The ʿAbbāsid Recovery: The War Against the Zanj Ends, A.D. 879–893/A.H. 266–279. SUNY Series in Near Eastern Studies. Albany, New York: State University of New York Press. ISBN 978-0-88706-054-0.
- Finer, Samuel Edward (1999). The History of Government from the Earliest Times, Volume II: The Intermediate Ages. New York and Oxford: Oxford University Press. ISBN 978-0-19-820790-0.
- Ibn al-Sāʿī (2017). Consorts of the Caliphs: Women and the Court of Baghdad. Translated by Shawkat M. Toorawa and the Editors of the Library of Arabic Literature. Introduction by Julia Bray, Foreword by Marina Warner. New York: New York University Press. ISBN 978-1-4798-0477-1.
- Kennedy, Hugh N. (1993). "al-Muʿtaḍid Bi'llāh". In Bosworth, C. E.; van Donzel, E.; Heinrichs, W. P. & Pellat, Ch. (eds.). The Encyclopaedia of Islam, Second Edition. Volume VII: Mif–Naz. Leiden: E. J. Brill. pp. 759–760. ISBN 978-90-04-09419-2.
- Kennedy, Hugh (2001). The Armies of the Caliphs: Military and Society in the Early Islamic State. London and New York: Routledge. ISBN 0-415-25093-5.
- Kennedy, Hugh N. (2003). "Caliphs and Their Chroniclers in the Middle Abbasid Period (Third/Ninth Century)". In Robinson, Chase F. (ed.). Texts, Documents, and Artefacts: Islamic Studies in Honour of D.S. Richards. Leiden: Brill. pp. 17–35. ISBN 978-90-04-12864-4.
- Kennedy, Hugh (2004) [1986]. The Prophet and the Age of the Caliphates: The Islamic Near East from the 6th to the 11th Century (Second ed.). Harlow: Longman. ISBN 978-0-582-40525-7.
- Kennedy, Hugh N. (2004). "The Decline and Fall of the First Muslim Empire". Der Islam. 81: 3–30. doi:10.1515/islm.2004.81.1.3. ISSN 0021-1818. S2CID 163373996.
- Kennedy, Hugh N. (2006). When Baghdad Ruled the Muslim World: The Rise and Fall of Islam's Greatest Dynasty. Cambridge, MA: Da Capo Press. ISBN 978-0-306814808.
- Le Strange, Guy (1900). Baghdad During the Abbasid Caliphate from Contemporary Arabic and Persian Sources. Oxford: Clarendon Press. OCLC 257810905.
- Madelung, W. (1975). "The Minor Dynasties of Northern Iran". In Frye, Richard N. (ed.). The Cambridge History of Iran: From the Arab Invasion to the Saljuqs. Vol. 4. Cambridge: Cambridge University Press. pp. 198–249. ISBN 0-521-20093-8.
- Malti-Douglas, Fedwa (1999). "Texts and Tortures: The Reign of al-Mu'tadid and the Construction of Historical Meaning". Arabica. 46 (3): 313–336. doi:10.1163/157005899323288721. ISSN 0570-5398.
- Massignon, Louis (1994). The Passion of Al-Hallaj: Mystic and Martyr of Islam. Translated by Herbert Mason. Princeton University Press. ISBN 978-0-691019192.
- Masudi (2010) [1989]. The Meadows of Gold: The Abbasids. Translated by Paul Lunde and Caroline Stone. London and New York: Routledge. ISBN 978-0-7103-0246-5.
- Mottahedeh, Roy (1975). "The ʿAbbāsid Caliphate in Iran". In Frye, Richard N. (ed.). The Cambridge History of Iran: From the Arab Invasion to the Saljuqs. Vol. 4. Cambridge: Cambridge University Press. pp. 57–89. ISBN 0-521-20093-8.
- Rosenthal, Franz (1951). "From Arabic Books and Manuscripts IV: New Fragments of as-Saraḫsî". Journal of the American Oriental Society. 71 (2): 135–142. doi:10.2307/595411. JSTOR 595411.
- Sobernheim, Moritz (1987). "Khumārawaih". In Houtsma, Martijn Theodoor (ed.). E.J. Brill's First Encyclopaedia of Islam, 1913–1936, Volume IV: 'Itk–Kwaṭṭa. Leiden: Brill. p. 973. ISBN 978-90-04-08265-6.
- Sourdel, Dominique (1970). "The ʿAbbasid Caliphate". In Holt, P. M.; Lambton, Ann K. S.; Lewis, Bernard (eds.). The Cambridge History of Islam, Volume 1A: The Central Islamic Lands from Pre-Islamic Times to the First World War. Cambridge: Cambridge University Press. pp. 104–139. ISBN 978-0-521-21946-4.
- Talbi, Muhammad (1998). "Everyday life in the cities of Islam". In Bouhdiba, Abdelwahab; Ma'ruf al-Dawalibi, Muhammad (eds.). The Different Aspects of Islamic Culture: The Individual and Society in Islam. New York: UNESCO. pp. 379–460. ISBN 978-92-3-102742-0.
- Treadgold, Warren (1997). A History of the Byzantine State and Society. Stanford, California: Stanford University Press. ISBN 0-8047-2630-2.
- Zetterstéen, K. V. (1987). "al-Muʿtaḍid Bi'llāh". In Houtsma, Martijn Theodoor (ed.). E.J. Brill's First Encyclopaedia of Islam, 1913–1936, Volume VI: Morocco–Ruzzik. Leiden: Brill. p. 777. ISBN 978-90-04-08265-6.
- Zetterstéen, K. V. & Bosworth, C. E. (1993). "al-Muktafī". In Bosworth, C. E.; van Donzel, E.; Heinrichs, W. P. & Pellat, Ch. (eds.). The Encyclopaedia of Islam, Second Edition. Volume VII: Mif–Naz. Leiden: E. J. Brill. pp. 542–543. ISBN 978-90-04-09419-2.

al-Mu'tadid Abbasid dynasty Born: c. 854/861 Died: 5 April 902
Sunni Islam titles
Preceded by al-Mu'tamid	Caliph of the Abbasid Caliphate; 15 October 892 – 5 April 902	Succeeded by al-Muktafi
