= Isma'il ibn Bulbul =

Abbasid official and vizier (844/5–891)

Abuʾl-Ṣaqr Ismāʿīl ibn Bulbul (Arabic: أبو الصقر إسماعيل بن بلبل) (844/5–891) was an official of the Abbasid Caliphate during the reign of al-Mu'tamid (r. 870–892), serving as vizier of the Caliphate from 878 to 892.

Although he claimed membership of the Arab Banu Shayban tribe, he was of Persian or Mesopotamian origin. He rose through the ranks of the Abbasid bureaucracy, becoming head of the diwan of the royal domains, but appears in the sources only in 878, when he was appointed to the highest civil office, that of vizier, by the regent al-Muwaffaq. He was deposed soon after, but was reinstated in the same year. Nevertheless, real power in the government resided with al-Muwaffaq's own secretary, Sa'id ibn Makhlad, and it was not until the latter's downfall in 885/6 that Isma'il truly became head of the administration. He enjoyed wide-ranging authority which extended even to the military. It was he that, facing chronic financial shortages, recruited two merchant brothers, Ahmad ibn al-Furat and his brother Ali, who became central figures within the caliphal administration over the next few decades.

Isma'il ibn Bulbul had Shi'ite sympathies, and was a determined enemy in al-Muwaffaq's son, the future Caliph al-Mu'tadid (r. 892–902), whose growing political and military power he tried unsuccessfully to neutralize. Consequently, when al-Muwaffaq died in June 891 and was succeeded as regent by al-Mu'tadid, Isma'il was arrested and died shortly after.

== Sources ==
- Kennedy, Hugh (2004). The Prophet and the Age of the Caliphates: The Islamic Near East from the 6th to the 11th Century (Second ed.). Harlow: Longman. ISBN 978-0-582-40525-7.
- Sourdel, D. (1978). "Ismāʿīl b. Bulbul". In van Donzel, E.; Lewis, B.; Pellat, Ch. & Bosworth, C. E. (eds.). The Encyclopaedia of Islam, Second Edition. Volume IV: Iran–Kha. Leiden: E. J. Brill. p. 189. doi:10.1163/1573-3912_islam_SIM_3648. OCLC 758278456.

Preceded by	Vizier of the Abbasid Caliphate; 878 – June 891	Succeeded by Ubayd Allah ibn Sulayman
