= Al-Mu'tamid =

15th Abbasid caliph (r. 870–892)

al-Mu'tamid المعتمد
- Khalifah; Amir al-Mu'minin
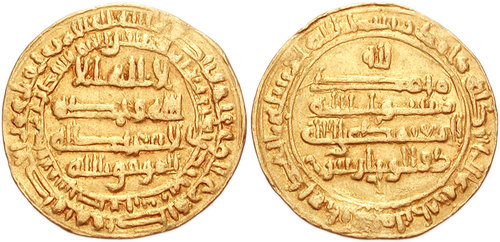
- Gold dinar of al-Mu'tamid, minted in 884/5, with the names of al-Muwaffaq and the latter's vizier, Sa'id ibn Makhlad (Dhu'l-Wizaratayn)

15th Caliph of the Abbasid Caliphate
- Reign: 16 June 870 – 14 October 892
- Predecessor: al-Muhtadi
- Successor: al-Mu'tadid
- Born: c. 842; Samarra, Abbasid Caliphate
- Died: 14 October 892 (aged c. 50); Samarra, Abbasid Caliphate
- Burial: Samarra
- Consort: Khallafah; Nabt
- Issue: al-Mufawwid; Muhammad; Abbas
Names
- Abu’l-ʿAbbās Aḥmad ibn Jaʿfar al-Muʿtamid ʿalā’Llāh
- Dynasty: Abbasid
- Father: al-Mutawakkil
- Mother: Fityan
- Religion: Sunni Islam

Abu’l-ʿAbbās Aḥmad ibn Jaʿfar ibn Muḥammad ibn Hārūn al-Muʿtamid ʿalā’Llāh (Arabic: أبو العباس أحمد بن جعفر; c. 842 – 14 October 892), better known by his regnal name al-Muʿtamid ʿalā 'llāh (المعتمد على الله, 'Dependent on God'), was the caliph of the Abbasid Caliphate from 870 to 892. His reign marks the end of the "Anarchy at Samarra" and the start of the Abbasid restoration, but he was largely a ruler in name only. Power was held by his brother al-Muwaffaq, who held the loyalty of the military. Al-Mu'tamid's authority was circumscribed further after a failed attempt to flee to the domains controlled by Ahmad ibn Tulun in late 882, and he was placed under house arrest by his brother. In 891, when al-Muwaffaq died, loyalists attempted to restore power to the Caliph, but were quickly overcome by al-Muwaffaq's son al-Mu'tadid, who assumed his father's powers. When al-Mu'tamid died in 892, al-Mu'tadid succeeded him as caliph.

== Early life ==
Family tree of the Abbasid caliphs of the ninth century

The future al-Mu'tamid was a son of Caliph al-Mutawakkil (r. 847–861) and a Kufan slave girl called Fityan. His full name was Ahmad ibn Jaʿfar, and was also known by the patronymic Abu'l-Abbas and from his mother as Ibn Fityan.

Ahmad as a young prince spend his early life in Samarra. His father, al-Mutawakkil had created a succession plan that would allow his three sons to inherit the caliphate after his death; he would be succeeded first by his eldest son, Muhammad al-Muntasir, then by Muhammad al-Mu'tazz and third by Ibrahim al-Mu'ayyad.

Ahmad's father was assassinated on the night of 10/11 December, about one hour after midnight, the Turkic guards (with the help of his elder half brother al-Muntasir) burst in the chamber where the caliph and al-Fath were having supper. Al-Fath was killed trying to protect the Caliph al-Mutawakkil, who was killed next. Al-Muntasir, who then assumed the caliphate, initially claimed that al-Fath had murdered his father and that he had been killed after; within a short time, however, the official story changed to al-Mutawakkil choking on his drink. His elder half brother al-Muntasir ruled from 11 December 861 to 7 June 862 until his mysterious death, nearly for six months. He was succeeded by cousin al-Musta'in, who ruled 8 June 862 to January 866. He was then succeeded by al-Mu'tazz, who ruled the Caliphate from 866 to 13 July 869 and after his downfall, his cousin Muhammad (al-Muhtadi) ruled for a year. After al-Muhtadi was deposed by the Turkish commanders Bayakbak and Yarjukh, he was selected by the military as his successor and proclaimed Caliph with the regnal name al-Muʿtamid ʿAlā 'llāh on 16 or 19 June 870. On 21 June, al-Muhtadi was executed. Ahmad played no role in political affairs during the reign of his brothers and cousins.

== Reign ==
=== Reign and relationship with al-Muwaffaq ===
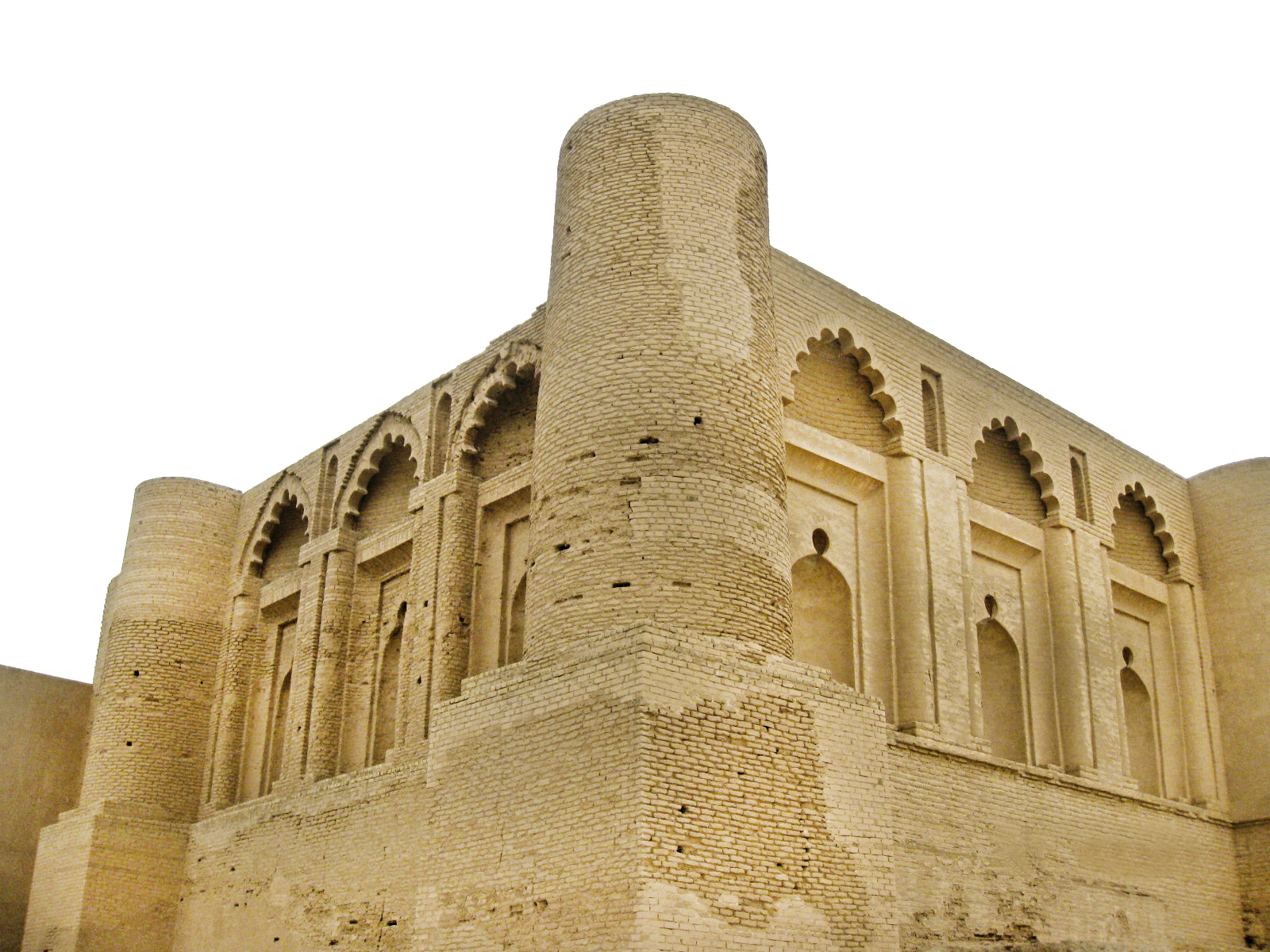
The Qasr al-'Ashiq palace was commissioned under al-Mu'tamid, and was built in 877–882

The accession of al-Mu'tamid brought an end to the turmoils of the "Anarchy at Samarra", which had begun with the murder of al-Mutawakkil in 861. Caliphal authority in the provinces collapsed during that period, with the result that the central government lost effective control over most of the Caliphate outside the metropolitan region of Iraq. In the west, Egypt had fallen under the control of the ambitious Turkish soldier Ahmad ibn Tulun, who also had designs on Syria, while Khurasan and most of the Islamic East had been taken over by the Saffarids under Ya'qub ibn al-Layth, who replaced the Abbasid's loyal governor, Muhammad ibn Tahir. Most of the Arabian peninsula was likewise lost to local potentates, while in Tabaristan a radical Zaydi Shi'a dynasty took power. Even in Iraq, a rebellion of the Zanj slaves had begun and soon threatened Baghdad itself, while further south the Qarmatians were a nascent threat. In addition, al-Mu'tamid's position was undermined from within, as during the coups of the previous years real power had come to lie with the elite Turkish troops, and with al-Mu'tamid's brother Abu Ahmad Talha, who, as the Caliphate's main military commander, served as the chief intermediary between the caliphal government and the Turks. When Caliph al-Mu'tazz died in 869, there was even popular agitation in Baghdad in favour of his elevation to Caliph.

In contrast to his brother, al-Mu'tamid appears to have lacked any experience of, and involvement in, politics, as well as a power base he could rely on. At the time al-Muhtadi was killed by the Turks, Abu Ahmad was at Mecca. Immediately he hastened north to Samarra, where he and Musa ibn Bugha effectively sidelined al-Mu'tamid, and assumed control of the government. Al-Mu'tamid was thus quickly reduced to a figurehead ruler, which remained the case for the remainder of his reign. Within a short time, Abu Ahmad was conferred an extensive governorate covering most of the lands still under caliphal authority: western Arabia, southern Iraq with Baghdad, and Fars. To denote his authority, he assumed an honorific name in the style of the caliphs, al-Muwaffaq bi-Allah. As one of the few vestiges of actual power, al-Mu'tamid retained the right to appoint his own viziers, originally choosing the experienced Ubayd Allah ibn Yahya ibn Khaqan, who had already served al-Mutawakkil. During his caliphate, the Caliph retained some freedom of action, but after his death in 877, he was replaced by al-Muwaffaq's secretary, Sulayman ibn Wahb. Ibn Wahb was soon disgraced and replaced as vizier by Isma'il ibn Bulbul. Real power however lay again with al-Muwaffaq's new secretary, Sa'id ibn Makhlad, until his own disgrace and downfall in 885, after which Ibn Bulbul became the sole vizier to both al-Mu'tamid and al-Muwaffaq.

On 20 July 875, al-Mu'tamid formally arranged for the governance of the state and his succession: his underage son Ja'far was given the honorific name al-Mufawwad ila-llah, was named heir-apparent and assigned the western half of the Caliphate—Ifriqiya, Egypt, Syria, the Jazira and Mosul, Armenia, Mihrajanqadhaq and Hulwan— while al-Muwaffaq received the eastern provinces and was named second heir, except for the event that the Caliph died while al-Mufawwad was still a minor. In practice, al-Mufawwad never exercised any real authority, and al-Muwaffaq continued to exercise control over the western provinces as well through his trusted lieutenant Musa ibn Bugha, who was named al-Mufawwad's deputy. Al-Muwaffaq's power was strengthened by the military threats the Caliphate faced on all fronts, since he commanded the loyalty of the army. In April 876, al-Muwaffaq and Musa ibn Bugha defeated Ya'qub ibn al-Layth's attempt to capture Baghdad at the Battle of Dayr al-'Aqul and saved the Caliphate from collapse. The repulse of the Saffarids then allowed the Abbasids to concentrate their resources in suppressing the Zanj Revolt in the south. The Zanj rebels had managed to capture much of lower Iraq, and inflicted several defeats on the Abbasid troops. In 879, al-Muwaffaq's son Abu'l-Abbas, the future Caliph al-Mu'tadid (r. 892–902), was given the command against the Zanj, and in the next year, al-Muwaffaq himself joined the campaign. In a succession of engagements in the marshes of southern Iraq, the Abbasid forces drove back the Zanj towards their capital, Mukhtara, which fell in August 883.

=== Defeat of the major rebellions in the Empire (870–892) ===
The main military threats to the Abbasid Empire were the Zanj Rebellion in southern Iraq and the ambitions of Ya'qub ibn al-Layth in the east. Al-Mu'tamid's brother, Al-Muwaffaq's drive and energy played a crucial role in their suppression. A humble soldier, Ya'qub, surnamed al-Saffar ('the Coppersmith'), had exploited the decade-long Samarra strife to first gain control over his native Sistan, and then to expand his control. By 873 he ruled over almost all of the eastern lands of the Caliphate, ousting the hitherto dominant governors of Khorasan from power, a move denounced by al-Muwaffaq and caliph al-Mu'tamid. Finally, in 875 he seized control of the province of Fars, which not only provided much of the scarce revenue for the Caliphate's coffers, but was also dangerously close to Iraq. The Abbasids tried to prevent an attack by Ya'qub by formally recognizing him as governor over all the eastern provinces and by granting him special honours, including adding his name to the Friday sermon and appointment to the influential position of sahib al-shurta (chief of police) in Baghdad. Nevertheless, in the next year Ya'qub began his advance on Baghdad, until he was confronted and decisively beaten by the Abbasids under al-Muwaffaq and Musa ibn Bugha at the Battle of Dayr al-Aqul near Baghdad. The Abbasid victory, a complete surprise to many, saved the capital.

Nevertheless, the Saffarids remained firmly ensconced in their possession of most of the Iranian provinces, and in 879, even the Abbasid court had to recognize Ya'qub as governor of Fars. After Ya'qub died from illness in the same year, his brother and successor, Amr ibn al-Layth, acknowledged the Caliph's suzerainty and had been rewarded with the governorship over the eastern provinces and the position of sahib al-shurta of Baghdad—essentially held—in exchange for an annual tribute of one million dirhams. Soon Amr was having trouble asserting his authority, especially in Khurasan, where already under Ya'qub pro-central government opposition had emerged, first under Ahmad ibn Abdallah al-Khujistani, and then under Rafi ibn Harthama, who challenged Saffarid rule over the province.

With the Zanj subdued, after 883 al-Muwaffaq turned his attention again to the east. In 884/5, al-Muwaffaq ordered the public cursing of Amr, and appointed the Ahmad ibn Abd al-Aziz ibn Abi Dulaf as governor of Kirman and Fars, and the reinstated the ousted governor, Muhammad ibn Tahir, as governor over Khurasan, with Rafi ibn Harthama as his deputy. The army under the vizier Sa'id ibn Makhlad conquered most of the province of Fars, forcing Amr himself to come west. After initial success against the caliphal general Tark ibn al-Abbas, Amr was routed by Ahmad ibn Abd al-Aziz in 886, and again in 887 by al-Muwaffaq in person. Amr's ally, Abu Talha Mansur ibn Sharkab, defected to the Abbasids, but Amr was able to retreat to Sijistan, protected from pursuit by the desert.

The threat by the Tulunids and the Byzantine regime in the west forced al-Muwaffaq to negotiate a settlement in 888/9 that largely restored the previous status quo, with Amr recognized as governor of Khurasan, Fars, and Kirman, paying 10 million dirhams as tribute in exchange, and his agent, Ubaydallah ibn Abdallah, sent to become sahib al-shurta of Baghdad. In 890, al-Muwaffaq again attempted to take back Fars, but this time the invading Abbasid army under Ahmad ibn Abd al-Aziz was defeated, and another agreement restored peaceful relations and Amr's titles and possessions.

Map of al-Iraq and Ahwaz at the time of the Zanj rebellion

The struggle against the uprising of the Zanj slaves in the marshlands of southern Iraq—according to Michael Bonner "the greatest slave rebellion in the history of Islam"—which began in September 869, was a long and difficult conflict, and almost brought the Caliphal government to is knees. Due to the Saffarid threat, the Abbasids could not fully mobilize against the Zanj until 879. Consequently, the Zanj initially held the upper hand, capturing much of lower Iraq including Basra and Wasit and defeating the Abbasid armies, which were reduced to trying to contain the Zanj advance. The balance tipped after 879, when al-Muwaffaq's son Abu'l-Abbas was given the command. Abu'l-Abbas was joined in 880 by al-Muwaffaq himself, and in a succession of engagements in the marshes of southern Iraq, the Abbasid forces drove back the Zanj towards their capital, Mukhtara, which fell in August 883. Another son of al-Muwaffaq, Harun, also participated in the campaigns. He also served as nominal governor of a few provinces, but died young on 7 November 883.

The victory over the Zanj was celebrated as a major triumph for al-Muwaffaq personally and for the regime, al-Muwaffaq received the victory title al-Nasir li-Din Allah ('he who upholds the Faith of God'), while his secretary Sa'id ibn Makhlad received the title Dhu'l-Wizaratayn ('holder of the two vizierates').

=== Relations with Ibn Tulun and al-Mu'tamid's attempted flight to Egypt ===
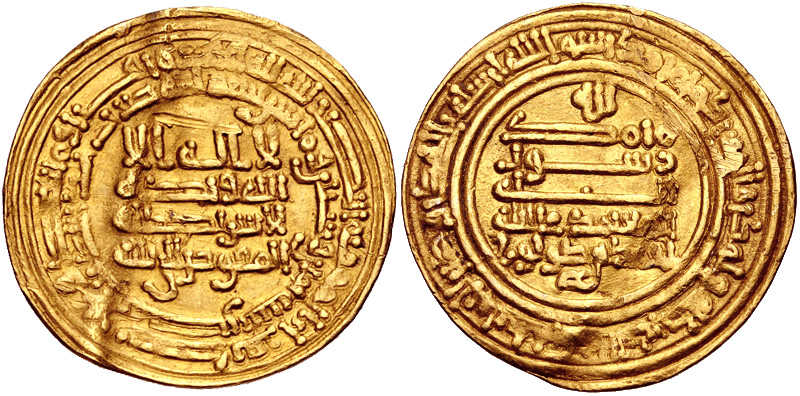
Gold dinar, minted in Fustat in 881/2, in the name of al-Mu'tamid, al-Mufawwad, and the ruler of Egypt Ahmad ibn Tulun

At the same time, al-Muwaffaq also had to contend with the ambitions of Ahmad ibn Tulun in the western provinces. Ibn Tulun and the Abbasid regent fell out in 875/6, on the occasion of a large remittance of revenue from Egypt to the central government. Counting on the rivalry between the Caliph and his over-mighty brother to maintain his own position, Ibn Tulun forwarded a larger share of the taxes to al-Mu'tamid instead of al-Muwaffaq: 2.2 million gold dinars went to the Caliph and only 1.2 million dinars to his brother. Al-Muwaffaq, who in his fight against the Zanj considered himself entitled to the major share of the provincial revenues, was angered by this, and by the implied machinations between Ibn Tulun and his brother. Al-Muwaffaq nominated Musa ibn Bugha as governor of Egypt and sent him with troops to Syria, but a lack of funds led to the expedition's failure before even reaching Egypt. In a public gesture of support for al-Mu'tamid and opposition to al-Muwaffaq, Ibn Tulun assumed the title of "Servant of the Commander of the Faithful" (mawlā amīr al-muʾminīn) in 878. With the support of al-Mu'tamid, in 877/8 Ibn Tulun managed to be assigned responsibility for the entirety of Syria and the Cilician frontier zone (Thughur) with the Byzantine Empire.

In 881, Ibn Tulun added his own name to coins issued by the mints under his control, along with those of the Caliph and heir apparent, al-Mufawwad. In the autumn of 882, the Tulunid general Lu'lu' defected to the Abbasids, and the cities of the Thughur rejected Tulunid rule, forcing Ibn Tulun to go once again in person to Syria. Al-Mu'tamid used the moment to escape from his confinement in Samarra, and with a small entourage made for Tulunid domains. Messengers from the Caliph reached Ibn Tulun at Damascus, and the ruler of Egypt halted and awaited the Caliph's arrival with great anticipation: not only would the sole source of political legitimacy in the Muslim world reside under his control, but he would also be able to pose as the "rescuer" of the Caliph from his overreaching brother. In the event, however, Sa'id ibn Makhlad managed to alert the governor of Mosul, Ishaq ibn Kundaj, who overtook and defeated al-Mu'tamid and his escort at al-Haditha on the Euphrates. Al-Mu'tamid was brought back to Samarra (February 883), where he was placed under virtual house arrest in the Jawsak Palace. In May/June, he was even moved south to Wasit, where al-Muwaffaq could keep an eye on him in person. Only in March 884 was the powerless Caliph allowed to return to Samarra. In the meantime, he was obliged to denounce Ibn Tulun, and appoint—nominally at least—Ishaq ibn Kundaj as governor of Syria and Egypt.

In 886/7, the Caliph conferred the title of "king" on the long-time ruler of Armenia, Ashot I (r. 862–890). Although the Armenian king continued to pay tribute to the Abbasid court and recognize its suzerainty, both he and the various minor Armenian princes were de facto independent monarchs.

== Final years and death ==
=== Rise of al-Mu'tadid and Death ===
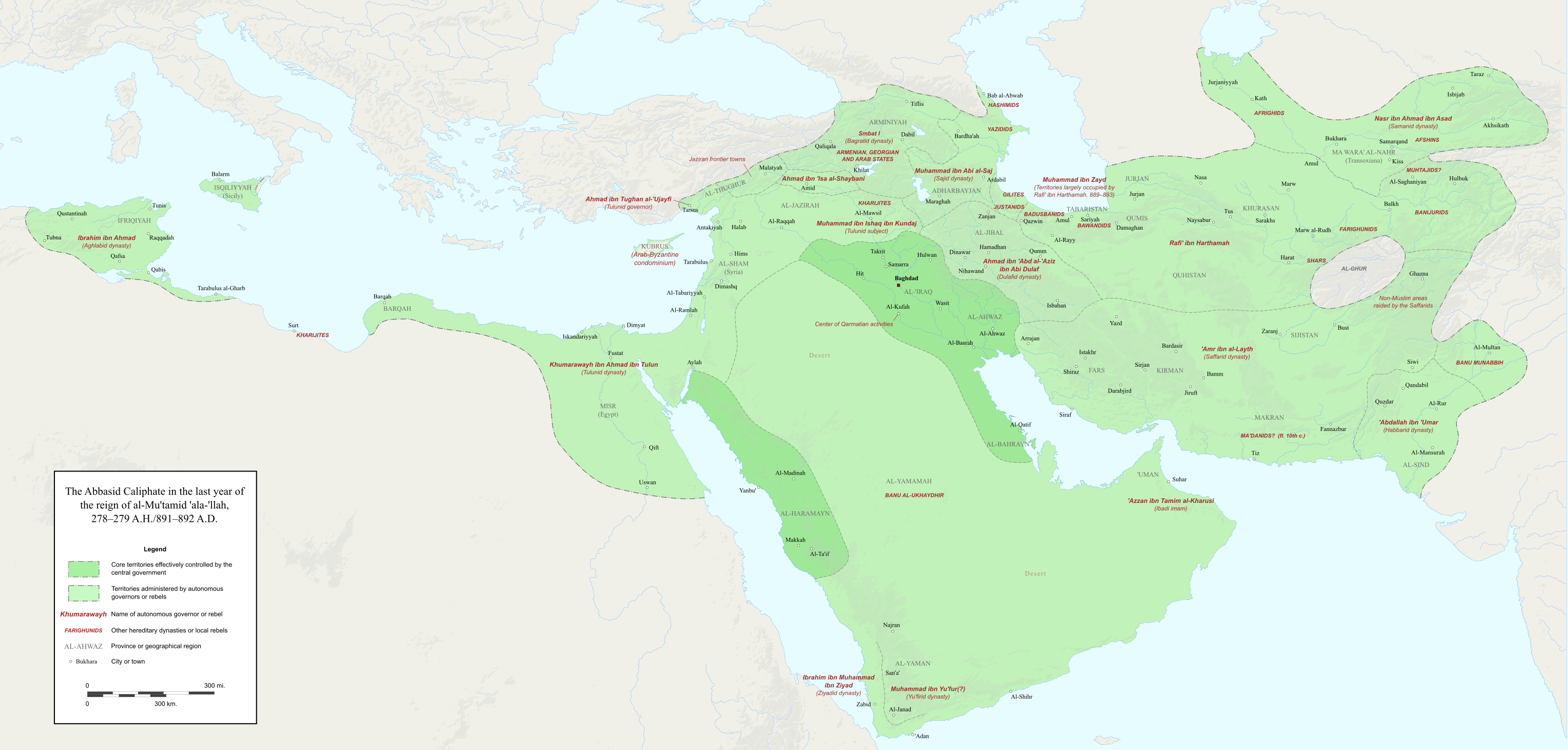
Map of the Abbasid Caliphate in the final year of al-Mu'tadid's reign: areas under direct Abbasid control in dark green, areas under loose Abbasid suzerainty, but under autonomous governors or rebels, in light green

In 889, al-Muwaffaq fell out with his son, Abu'l-Abbas, for reasons that are unclear, and had him imprisoned. Al-Muwaffaq spent the next two years on campaign in the Jibal in what is now western Iran. By the time he returned to Baghdad in May 891, al-Muwaffaq was already nearing death. The garrison commander of Baghdad, and the vizier Isma'il ibn Bulbul, hatched a plot to keep Abu'l-Abbas imprisoned and allow power to pass to al-Mu'tamid. Therefore, they invited the Caliph and his son to come to the city, which they did. In the event, however, the attempt to sideline Abu'l-Abbas failed, due to his popularity with the soldiers and the common people: the soldiers set him free, and when al-Muwaffaq died on 2 June, Abu'l-Abbas immediately assumed his father's position. Abu'l-Abbas assumed the title of al-Mu'tadid bi-llah and took his father's position in the line of succession after the Caliph and al-Mufawwad. The powerless al-Mufawwad was pushed aside on 30 April 892, and when al-Mu'tamid died on 14 October 892, "apparently as a result of a surfeit of drink and food" (Hugh N. Kennedy), al-Mu'tadid took power as caliph.

=== Succession ===
His nephew, Abu'l-Abbas al-Mu'tadid ascend the throne, quickly emerging as "the most powerful and effective Caliph since al-Mutawakkil" (Kennedy).

From the start of al-Mu'tadid's reign, the new Caliph set out to reverse the fragmentation of the Abbasid Caliphate, a goal towards which he worked with a mixture of force and diplomacy. Although an active and enthusiastic campaigner, al-Mu'tadid was also "a skilful diplomat, always prepared to make compromises with those who were too powerful to defeat", according to Kennedy.

Also, Hassan al-Askari, the eleventh Imam of Twelver shiites was killed on orders of al-Mu'tamid.

== Sources ==
- Gordon, Matthew S. (2001). The Breaking of a Thousand Swords: A History of the Turkish Military of Samarra (A.H. 200–275/815–889 C.E.). Albany, New York: State University of New York Press. ISBN 0-7914-4795-2.
- Kennedy, Hugh (2006). When Baghdad Ruled the Muslim World: The Rise and Fall of Islam's Greatest Dynasty. Cambridge, MA: Da Capo Press. ISBN 978-0-306814808.
- Kraemer, Joel L., ed. (1989). The History of al-Ṭabarī, Volume XXXIV: Incipient Decline: The Caliphates of al-Wāthiq, al-Mutawakkil and al-Muntaṣir, A.D. 841–863/A.H. 227–248. SUNY Series in Near Eastern Studies. Albany, New York: State University of New York Press. ISBN 978-0-88706-874-4.
- Bosworth, C. E. (1993). "al-Muʿtazz Bi'llāh". In Bosworth, C. E.; van Donzel, E.; Heinrichs, W. P. & Pellat, Ch. (eds.). The Encyclopaedia of Islam, Second Edition. Volume VII: Mif–Naz. Leiden: E. J. Brill. pp. 793–794. ISBN 978-90-04-09419-2.
- Bianquis, Thierry (1998). "Autonomous Egypt from Ibn Ṭūlūn to Kāfūr, 868–969". In Petry, Carl F. (ed.). The Cambridge History of Egypt: Islamic Egypt, 640–1517. Vol. 1. Cambridge: Cambridge University Press. pp. 86–119. ISBN 0-521-47137-0.
- Canard, Marius (1960). "Armīniya, II. History 2. – Armenia under Arab domination". In Gibb, H. A. R.; Kramers, J. H.; Lévi-Provençal, E.; Schacht, J.; Lewis, B. & Pellat, Ch. (eds.). The Encyclopaedia of Islam, Second Edition. Volume I: A–B. Leiden: E. J. Brill. pp. 635–638. doi:10.1163/1573-3912_islam_COM_0064. OCLC 495469456.
- Bonner, Michael (2010). "The waning of empire, 861–945". In Robinson, Chase F. (ed.). The New Cambridge History of Islam, Volume 1: The Formation of the Islamic World, Sixth to Eleventh Centuries. Cambridge: Cambridge University Press. pp. 305–359. ISBN 978-0-521-83823-8.
- Bosworth, C. E. (1975). "The Ṭāhirids and Ṣaffārids". In Frye, Richard N. (ed.). The Cambridge History of Iran: From the Arab Invasion to the Saljuqs. Vol. 4. Cambridge: Cambridge University Press. pp. 90–135. ISBN 0-521-20093-8.
- Fields, Philip M., ed. (1987). The History of al-Ṭabarī, Volume XXXVII: The ʿAbbāsid Recovery: The War Against the Zanj Ends, A.D. 879–893/A.H. 266–279. SUNY Series in Near Eastern Studies. Albany, New York: State University of New York Press. ISBN 978-0-88706-054-0.
- Hassan, Zaky M. (1960). "Aḥmad b. Ṭūlūn". In Gibb, H. A. R.; Kramers, J. H.; Lévi-Provençal, E.; Schacht, J.; Lewis, B. & Pellat, Ch. (eds.). The Encyclopaedia of Islam, Second Edition. Volume I: A–B. Leiden: E. J. Brill. pp. 278–279. OCLC 495469456.
- Kennedy, Hugh N. (1993). "al-Muʿtamid ʿAlā 'llāh". In Bosworth, C. E.; van Donzel, E.; Heinrichs, W. P. & Pellat, Ch. (eds.). The Encyclopaedia of Islam, Second Edition. Volume VII: Mif–Naz. Leiden: E. J. Brill. pp. 765–766. ISBN 978-90-04-09419-2.
- Kennedy, Hugh (2001). The Armies of the Caliphs: Military and Society in the Early Islamic State. London and New York: Routledge. ISBN 0-415-25093-5.
- Kennedy, Hugh (2004) [1986]. The Prophet and the Age of the Caliphates: The Islamic Near East from the 6th to the 11th Century (Second ed.). Harlow: Longman. ISBN 978-0-582-40525-7.
- Bowen, Harold (1928). The Life and Times of ʿAlí Ibn ʿÍsà, ‘The Good Vizier’. Cambridge: Cambridge University Press.
- Özaydın, Abdülkerim (2016). "Muvaffak el-Abbâsî". TDV Encyclopedia of Islam, Supplement 2 (Kâfûr, Ebü'l-Misk – Züreyk, Kostantin) (in Turkish). Istanbul: Presidency of Religious Affairs, Centre for Islamic Studies. pp. 326–328. ISBN 978-975-389-889-8.
- Sourdel, D. (1970). "The ʿAbbasid Caliphate". In Holt, P. M.; Lambton, Ann K. S.; Lewis, Bernard (eds.). The Cambridge History of Islam, Volume 1A: The Central Islamic Lands from Pre-Islamic Times to the First World War. Cambridge: Cambridge University Press. pp. 104–139. ISBN 978-0-521-21946-4.
- Mottahedeh, Roy (1975). "The ʿAbbāsid Caliphate in Iran". In Frye, Richard N. (ed.). The Cambridge History of Iran: From the Arab Invasion to the Saljuqs. Vol. 4. Cambridge: Cambridge University Press. pp. 57–89. ISBN 0-521-20093-8.
- Waines, David, ed. (1992). The History of al-Ṭabarī, Volume XXXVI: The Revolt of the Zanj, A.D. 869–879/A.H. 255–265. SUNY Series in Near Eastern Studies. Albany, New York: State University of New York Press. ISBN 978-0-7914-0763-9.

Al-Mu'tamid Abbasid dynasty Born: 844 Died: 892
Sunni Islam titles
Preceded by Al-Muhtadi	Caliph of the Abbasid Caliphate; 16/19 June 870 – 14 October 892	Succeeded by Al-Mu'tadid
