= Kayghalagh =

Kayghalagh, surnamed al-Turki ("the Turk"), was a senior military commander of the Abbasid Caliphate active between c. 870 and c. 883.

== Life ==
Kayghalagh was one of the many Turks who entered service of the Abbasid Caliphate as soldiers (ghilman), and rose to be a prominent commander. Like most senior Turkish military figures of the late 9th century, he was apparently a protégé of the powerful Musa ibn Bugha, the most influential of the Turkish leaders until his death in 877. He is first mentioned in al-Tabari's History of the Prophets and Kings in June 870, when he was sent by Caliph al-Muhtadi to calm a riot among the people and troops at al-Karkh, along with Tabayaghu ibn Sul Artakin and the Caliph's brother Abdallah. As the crowd neared the palace, however, most of the senior officials and commanders, led by Abu Nasr Muhammad ibn Bugha, fled. Enticed by assurances to return, however, they did so, only to be immediately thrown into prison. Kayghalagh's role as administrator of the palace passed to Masrur al-Balkhi, who had remained in the palace.

Kayghalagh is next mentioned in 873, when he attacked and killed a certain Takin (an unidentified individual, as he is unlikely to have been the same as the Abbasid general of the same name). In 875/6, he was appointed governor of Rayy following the death of his predecessor, al-Salabi. Following the death of the vizier Ubaydallah ibn Yahya ibn Khaqan in August 877, Kayghalagh was granted possession of his palace at Samarra. In 879/80, he was appointed governor of the province of Jibal. At about the same time, his brother Abrun was serving as governor of Qazvin, a city in Jibal.

In 880, Kayghalagh led the Abbasid troops into a campaign against the autonomous magnate family of the Dulafids. Kayghalagh was victorious in a first battle near Qarmasin and entered Hamadan, but the Dulafid leader, Ahmad ibn Abd al-Aziz ibn Abi Dulaf, rallied his forces and decisively defeated Kayghalagh, forcing him to retreat to Saymarah (September/October 880). Kayghalagh is last mentioned in April 883, but his sons Ibrahim (died 916) and especially Ahmad (died 935) later rose to become senior commanders.

== Sources ==
- Fields, Philip M., ed. (1987). The History of al-Ṭabarī, Volume XXXVII: The ʿAbbāsid Recovery: The War Against the Zanj Ends, A.D. 879–893/A.H. 266–279. SUNY Series in Near Eastern Studies. Albany, New York: State University of New York Press. ISBN 978-0-88706-054-0.
- Kennedy, Hugh (2001). The Armies of the Caliphs: Military and Society in the Early Islamic State. London and New York: Routledge. ISBN 0-415-25093-5.
- Rosenthal, Franz, ed. (1985). The History of al-Ṭabarī, Volume XXXVIII: The Return of the Caliphate to Baghdad: The Caliphates of al-Muʿtaḍid, al-Muktafī and al-Muqtadir, A.D. 892–915/A.H. 279–302. SUNY Series in Near Eastern Studies. Albany, New York: State University of New York Press. ISBN 978-0-87395-876-9.
- Waines, David, ed. (1992). The History of al-Ṭabarī, Volume XXXVI: The Revolt of the Zanj, A.D. 869–879/A.H. 255–265. SUNY Series in Near Eastern Studies. Albany, New York: State University of New York Press. ISBN 978-0-7914-0763-9.
