= Sa'id ibn Makhlad =

Abbasid official and Vizier (878–885)

Sa'id ibn Makhlad سعيد بن مخلد
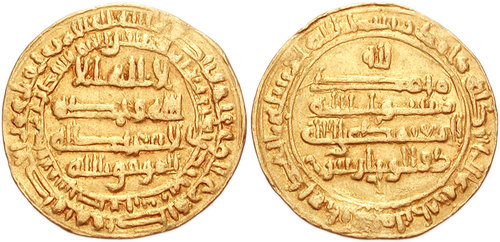
- Gold dinar of caliph Al-Mu'tamid, with the names of al-Muwaffaq and Sa'id ibn Makhlad (Dhu'l-Wizaratayn)
- Born: Baghdad, Abbasid Caliphate
- Died: c. 889; Samarra, Abbasid Caliphate
- Other names: ibn Makhlad, Dhu'l-Wizaratayn (title)
- Occupation(s): Abbasid vizier and Senior official
- Years active: 878 – 885 (as Senior Abbasid official)
- Known for: Abbasid senior official
- Father: Makhlad
- Relatives: Abdun ibn Makhlad (brother)

Sa'id ibn Makhlad (Arabic: سعيد بن مخلد) (died 889) was a senior official of the Abbasid Caliphate. Born a Nestorian Christian, he converted to Islam and served as a secretary in the Abbasid capital, Baghdad. He rose to prominence during the regency of al-Muwaffaq over his brother, the Caliph al-Mu'tamid (r. 870–892): between 878 and 885, he served as de facto vizier of the Caliphate, although he did not bear the title. His valuable assistance to al-Muwaffaq was recognized in 882 by the award of the honorific title Dhu'l-wizaratayn ("possessor of the two vizierates"), with which he appears even on coins. However, the activities of his brother, Abdun, who had remained a Christian and tried to obtain concessions for the Christian subjects of the Caliphate, brought about his sudden fall from power in 885. He died in 889.

Sa'id has been erroneously considered by some writers as the brother of another Christian convert, al-Hasan ibn Makhlad al-Jarrah, who was his predecessor as vizier.

== Sources ==
- Sourdel, Dominique (1971). "Ibn Makhlad". In Lewis, B.; Ménage, V. L.; Pellat, Ch. & Schacht, J. (eds.). The Encyclopaedia of Islam, Second Edition. Volume III: H–Iram. Leiden: E. J. Brill. p. 859. OCLC 495469525.
