= Michael Bonner =

American Islamic scholar (1952–2019)

Michael Bonner (1952 – May 25, 2019) was an American scholar of Islamic studies. He received his PhD in Near Eastern studies from Princeton in 1987. He was a professor of medieval Islamic history at the University of Michigan, Ann Arbor, where he served as chair of the department of Near Eastern Studies from 2010 to 2019. In addition to his monographs, he published dozens of scholarly articles and translations.

== Major works ==
- Islam in the Middle Ages: The Origins and Shaping of Classical Islamic Civilization. With Jacob Lassner. Oxford: Praeger/ABC Clio, 2010.
- Les Origines du jihâd. Paris: Les Éditions du Téraèdre, 2004.
  - Appeared in English as Jihad in Islamic History: Doctrines and Practices. Princeton: Princeton University Press, 2006.
  - Translated into Italian as La jihad, Rubbettino, 2008.
- Islam, Democracy and the State in Algeria: Lessons for the Western Mediterranean and Beyond. Co-edited with Mark Tessler and Megan Reif. A special issue of Journal of North African Studies (2004), and a volume published by Routledge, 2005.
- "Arab-Byzantine Relations". Vol. 8 of The Formation of the Classical Islamic World, under general editorship of Lawrence I. Conrad. Aldershot, UK: Ashgate/Variorum, 2004.
- Poverty and Charity in Middle Eastern Contexts. Co-edited with Amy Singer and Mine Ener. SUNY Press, 2003.
- Aristocratic Violence and Holy War: Studies on the Jihad and the Arab-Byzantine Frontier. New Haven: American Oriental Society Monograph Series, 1996.
