= Chase F. Robinson =

American historian of Islam (born 1963)

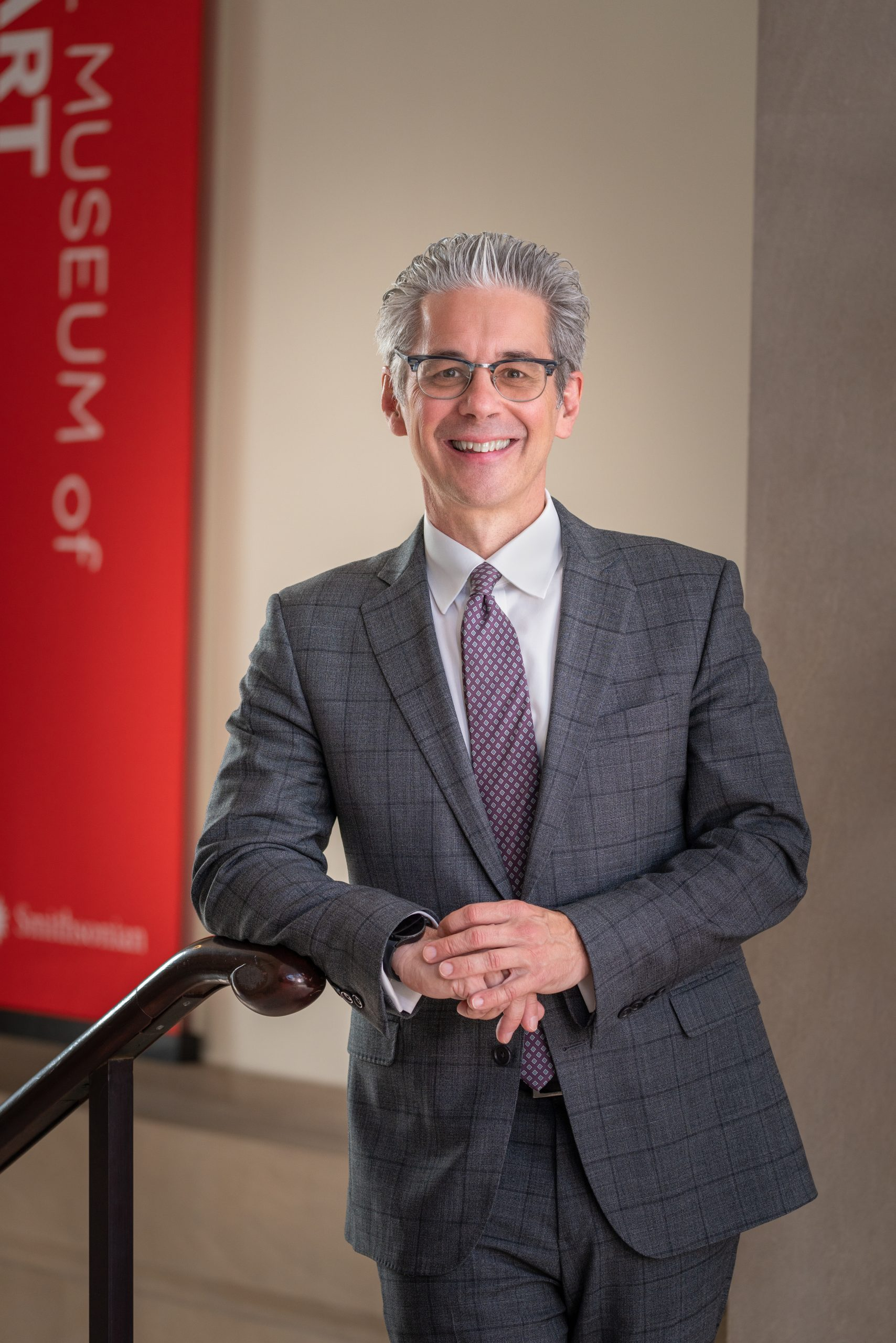
- Born: 1963 (age 62–63)
- Education: Brown University; Harvard University (PhD)
- Occupations: Historian and museum director

Chase F. Robinson (born 1963) is an American historian, educator, and academic administrator. He has served as the director of the Smithsonian's National Museum of Asian Art since December 2018.

== Early life and education ==
Robinson was born in Newton, Massachusetts to a university dean and high school teacher.

He attended St. Paul's School, spending a year studying in Rennes, France. He earned his B.A. with honors from Brown University. Between 1983 and 1986, he lived in the Middle East, studying at the Hebrew University of Jerusalem, the American University in Cairo, Cairo University, and the Center for Arabic Study Abroad. He earned his Ph.D. from the Department of Near Eastern Languages and Civilizations at Harvard University in 1992.

== Career ==
=== Oxford ===
After completing his doctorate, Robinson was appointed university lecturer in Islamic History in the Faculty of Oriental Studies at the University of Oxford, and became a fellow of Wolfson College.

In 2004, he was appointed Professor of Early Islamic History, and served as chairman of the Faculty Board from 2003 to 2005. He was a member of the School of Historical Studies at the Institute for Advanced Study in 1999, and a visiting professor of History at the University of California, Los Angeles in 2002. He received a two-year research fellowship from the British Academy in 2005.

=== City University of New York ===
In 2008, Robinson joined the Graduate Center of the City University of New York (CUNY) as Distinguished Professor and senior vice president and provost.

In 2013, he was appointed president of the Graduate Center. During his tenure, the center acquired the Advanced Science Research Center and established the Stone Center for Socio-Economic Inequality.

=== Smithsonian Institution ===
In December 2018, Robinson became the Dame Jillian Sackler Director of the Smithsonian’s National Museum of Asian Art (incorporating the Arthur M. Sackler Gallery and Freer Gallery of Art).

During his tenure, the museum expanded its curation and public programming in Korean and Southeast Asian art, launched a redesigned, award-winning digital infrastructure, and introduced annual public programming celebrating cultural festivals such as Diwali and Chuseok and honoring AANHPI Month with IlluminAsia. Major exhibitions hosted by the museum during this period included "Empresses of China’s Forbidden City" (2019), "Hokusai: Mad about Painting" (2021), "Anyang: China’s Ancient City of Kings" (2023), "A Splendid Land: Paintings from Royal Udaipur" (2023), and "Korean Treasures" (2026). In 2023, the museum marked its centennial with a year-long schedule of exhibitions and public events organized around the theme "Journeys."

Robinson has focused on provenance research, the protection of cultural heritage, and ethical collecting practices as core institutional directions for the museum. Under his leadership, the museum expanded its international partnerships on cultural property preservation, including bilateral agreements and repatriation workflows with the Republic of Yemen and the Kingdom of Cambodia. In December 2025, the museum returned three Khmer Empire sculptures to Cambodia—the "Head of Harihara," "The Goddess Uma," and "Prajnaparamita"—as the museum’s first return under the Smithsonian’s Shared Stewardship and Ethical Returns policy.

In May 2025, the museum deaccessioned and formally transferred fragments of the ancient Zidanku Silk Manuscripts—the oldest known silk manuscripts discovered in China—to the National Cultural Heritage Administration of the People's Republic of China, at a ceremony held at the Chinese Embassy in Washington. Robinson described the transfer as the product of "decades of collaboration with Chinese researchers." That same month, the museum formalized a four-year collaboration agreement with the Royal Commission for AlUla in Saudi Arabia centered on joint research, conservation, and exhibition of newly discovered statuary at the ancient site of Dadan.

In 2026, he received an honorary doctorate from the American University of Cairo and served as the speaker for the Spring 2026 undergraduate commencement ceremony.

== Research and publications ==
Robinson’s historical research focuses on early Islamic history, Islamic civilization, historiography, and museum history. He has authored or edited nine books and more than forty articles. His volume titles include:

- (ed. with Gordon et al.) The Works of Ibn Wadih al-Ya'qubi: An English Translation. (3 vols.) Leiden, 2017.
- Islamic Civilization in Thirty Lives: The First 1,000 Years. Los Angeles and London, 2016. Cambridge Studies in Islamic Civilization". Cambridge University Press.
- (ed., with S. Foot), Historical Writing, 600-1400, volume 2 of the Oxford History of Historical Writing. Oxford, 2012.
- (ed.) The New Cambridge History of Islam: Volume 1, The Formation of the Islamic World, Sixth to Eleventh Centuries. Cambridge, 2010.
- Abd al-Malik. Oxford, 2005.
- (ed.) Texts, Documents and Artefacts: Islamic Studies in Honour of D.S. Richards. Leiden, 2003.
- Islamic Historiography. Cambridge, 2003.
- (ed.) A Medieval Islamic City Reconsidered: An Interdisciplinary Approach to Samarra. Oxford, 2001
- Empire and Elites after the Muslim Conquest: The Transformation of Northern Mesopotamia. Cambridge, 2000.

He has served on several academic editorial boards, including the journal Past & Present and as Series Editor for Cambridge Studies in Islamic Civilization. He speaks internationally on museum policy, cultural diplomacy, and heritage protection.

== Personal life ==
Robinson lives in Northern Virginia with his wife, and has two children.

He is an alumnus of St. Paul's School (Class of 1981) and serves on the school's board of trustees.
