= Hasani Palace =

Abbasid Caliphal palace

The Hasani Palace (Arabic: القصر الحسني, romanized: al-Qaṣr al-Ḥasanī) was the first caliphal palace to be built in East Baghdad, and the main residence of the Abbasid caliphs in the city during the 9th and 10th centuries. As such it formed the nucleus around which a large complex of palaces and gardens emerged, that would be the residence of the Abbasid caliphs until the Sack of Baghdad by the Mongols.

== Background: East Baghdad and the palace of Ja'far the Barmakid ==
The original palaces of the Abbasid caliphs had been in or near the Round City founded by Caliph al-Mansur (r. 754–775): the Palace of the Golden Gate at the centre of the Round City, and the somewhat later Khuld Palace, constructed outside the Round City on the western bank of the Tigris River. During the first century of the Abbasid Caliphate, East Baghdad, that is, the portion of the city east of the Tigris, was of less importance, although al-Mansur built there a palace for his son and heir, al-Mahdi (r. 775–785).

The Hasani Palace begun as a pleasure house of the Barmakid Ja'far ibn Yahya, minister, favourite companion, and brother-in-law of Caliph Harun al-Rashid (r. 786–809). Ja'far was well known for his revels, which included wine-drinking, and caused much opprobrium in the city. As a result, he built a residence in the open country, at some distance to the south from the populated quarters of East Baghdad. Ja'far's palatial mansion was so splendid that it might have aroused jealousy from the Caliph; a friend therefore counselled him to ostensibly offer it as a gift to the then underage al-Ma'mun (r. 813–833), Harun's second son and later caliph, who from his birth had been entrusted to the guardianship and tutorship of Ja'far. Thus the palace, although used by Ja'far until the sudden downfall of the Barmakids in 803, became known as the "Palace of Ma'mun" (al-Qaṣr al-Maʾmūnī).

== Residence of al-Ma'mun, al-Hasan ibn Sahl, and Buran ==
After 803, al-Ma'mun moved into the building, which became one of his favourite residences. He enlarged the palace, and added a large open space (maydan) for horse racing and polo and a zoological park. A gate opening to the open expanses of the east was added, as well as a canal bringing water from the Nahr Mu'alla. For his servants and the palace personnel he also laid out a residential quarter nearby, which was named Maʾmūnīya after him.

The palace remained apparently unoccupied after al-Ma'mun left to take up the viceroyalty of Khurasan, and throughout the Abbasid civil war that followed Harun's death between al-Ma'mun and his half-brother, al-Amin (r. 809–813). During the war, the Palace of the Golden Gate, which had been al-Amin's stronghold during the Siege of Baghdad (812–813), was virtually destroyed, and the Khuld also suffered considerable damage. As a result, when al-Ma'mun returned to Baghdad in 819 he rook up residence in the western wing of the Khuld, while his vizier and trusted confidant, al-Hasan ibn Sahl, took up residence in the Ma'muni Palace. Shortly after, as a recompense for the vizier's lavish expenditure during the festivities for the marriage between al-Ma'mun and al-Hasan's daughter Buran, the Caliph gifted the palace to him. Al-Hasan rebuilt and enlarged the palace further, but after a few years he gave it to his daughter Buran, who outlived her husband al-Ma'mun and lived there until her death in 884. Hasan's rebuilding and Buran's usage established the palace's common name, "Palace of al-Hasan" or "Hasani Palace" (al-Qaṣr al-Ḥasanī), although even in later times writers still were wont to refer to it as the Ma'muni or even the Ja'fari Palace (القصر الجعفري, al-Qaṣr al-Ja'farī).

== Caliphal residence and the construction of the Dār al-Khilāfat ==
After al-Ma'mun's death in 833, his brother and successor, al-Mu'tasim (r. 833–842) is said by one source to have also lived in the Hasani Palace, before he built for himself a new palace in the nearby Mukharrim quarter. In 836, however, he founded a new city, Samarra, in the north and moved the caliphal court and capital of the Abbasid empire there. Although Caliph al-Mu'tamid (r. 870–892) spent the last months of his life in Baghdad, it was not until 892 that the Caliph al-Mu'tadid (r. 892–902) returned the capital permanently to Baghdad.

Yaqut al-Hamawi reports that when al-Mu'tamid came to the city, he asked from Buran to take possession of the Hasani Palace as his residence. She asked for a brief delay in order to set her affairs in order, but instead took this time to furnish the palace and make it fit for the caliph, before handing it over to him. This anecdote is widely reported, but the original source of the story, the 11th-century chronicler Khatib, reports that the caliph in question was al-Mu'tadid, and himself expresses doubts about its authenticity, since Buran was known to have died years earlier. According to Guy Le Strange, however, the incident reported may reflect an earlier visit by al-Mu'tamid to the city.

Under al-Mu'tadid, the Hasani became the official caliphal residence. The Caliph added new buildings, including a prison, and enlarged its grounds and enclosed them in a wall. In addition, al-Mu'tadid and al-Muktafi (r. 902–908) built the Firdus Palace upstream, the Thurayya Palace to the east, and the Taj Palace downstream of the Hasani, creating thus a sprawling palace complex, the "Abode of the Caliphate" (Dār al-Khilāfat), comprising several major and minor residences and gardens. This remained the main caliphal residence for the remainder of the Abbasid Caliphate.

Upon his accession in 902, al-Muktafi destroyed the palace prisons built by his father, and erected in their place a Friday mosque, the Jāmiʿ al-Qaṣr ("Palace Mosque"), a site now occupied by a later structure, the Jāmiʿ al-Khulafa. Upon the grounds of the palace, the Mustansiriya Madrasah was erected in the 1230s.

== Sources ==
- Duri, A. A. (1960). "Baghdād". In Gibb, H. A. R.; Kramers, J. H.; Lévi-Provençal, E.; Schacht, J.; Lewis, B. & Pellat, Ch. (eds.). The Encyclopaedia of Islam, Second Edition. Volume I: A–B. Leiden: E. J. Brill. pp. 894–908. doi:10.1163/1573-3912_islam_COM_0084. OCLC 495469456.
- Le Strange, Guy (1922). Baghdad During the Abbasid Caliphate. From Contemporary Arabic and Persian Sources (Second ed.). Oxford: Clarendon Press.
