= Al-Khulafa Mosque =

Oldest surviving mosque in Baghdad, Iraq

- جامع الخلفاء
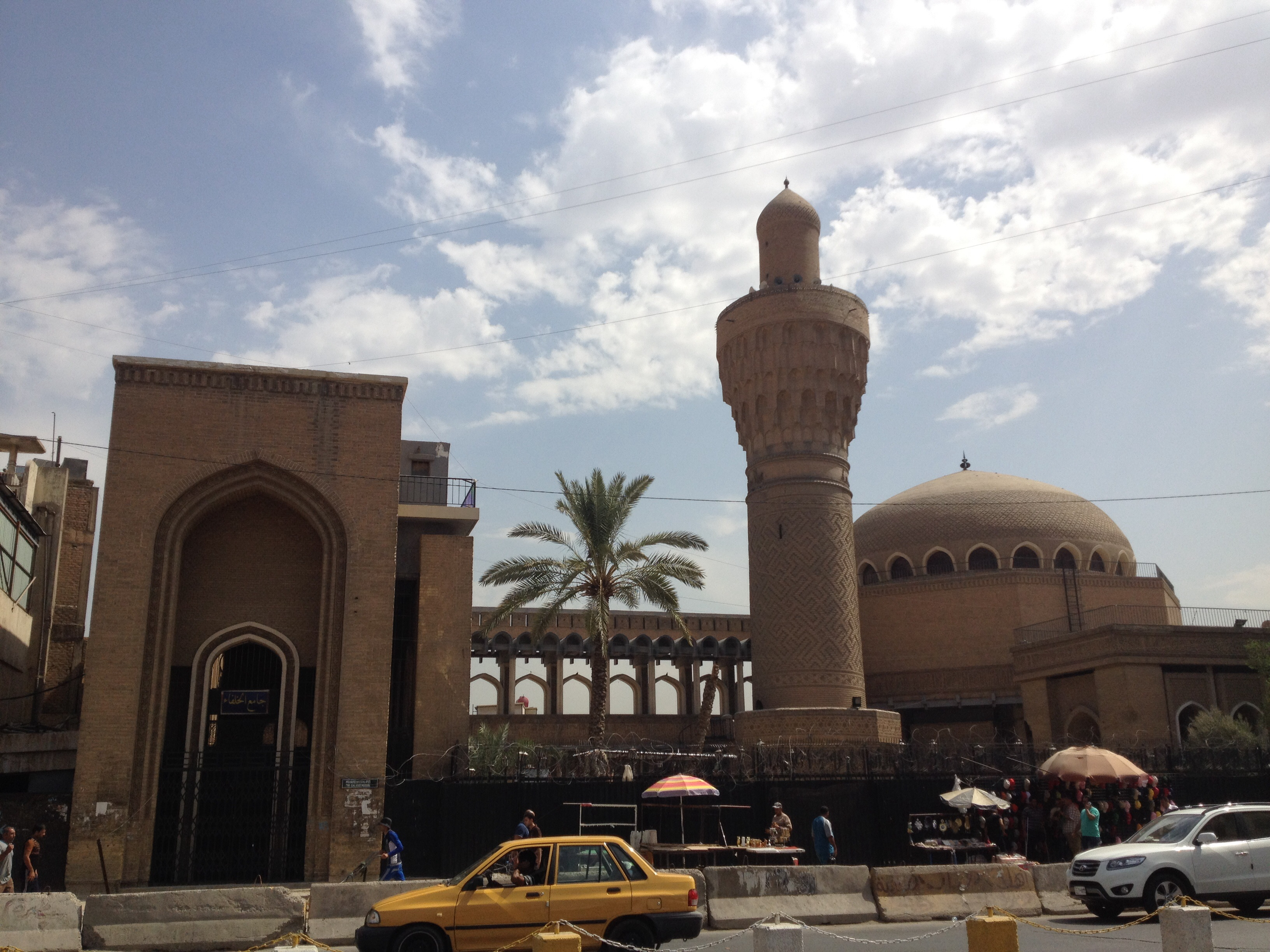

- Location of the mosque in Baghdad

Religion
- Affiliation: Sunni Islam
- Ecclesiastical or organisational status: Mosque
- Status: Active

Location
- Location: al-Rusafa, Baghdad, Baghdad Governorate
- Country: Iraq
- Interactive map of Al-Khulafa Mosque
- Coordinates: 33°20′20″N 44°23′52″E

Architecture
- Type: Mosque
- Style: modern Islamic (main building); Ilkhanid (minaret)
- Founder: Al-Muktafi
- Groundbreaking: 902 CE (original mosque); 1960 (present mosque)
- Completed: 1964 (present mosque)

Specifications
- Minaret: One
- Minaret height: 34 m (112 ft)

The Al-Khulafa Mosque (Arabic: جامع الخلفاء, romanized: Jami' Al-Khulafa), also known as the Al-Qasr Mosque (Arabic: جامع القصر), is a Sunni mosque located in the al-Rusafa district of Baghdad, in the Baghdad Governorate of Iraq. Situated on Jumhuriya Street, it is the oldest surviving mosque in Baghdad. It was first built in 908 CE and was completely rebuilt and restored in the 1960s by the Ministry of Awqaf in its current shape.

The minaret, though also restored in the 1960s, dates from the Ilkhanid period and used to be the highest point in Baghdad. Due to this, the mosque is referred to as one of the most important Islamic and historic landmarks in the city. However, in recent years the mosque has been threatened with collapse due to neglect from the Iraqi government. The mosque is also located across the street from the Latin Cathedral of St. Joseph in the Shorja area.

== History ==
=== Abbasid foundation (902-1258) ===
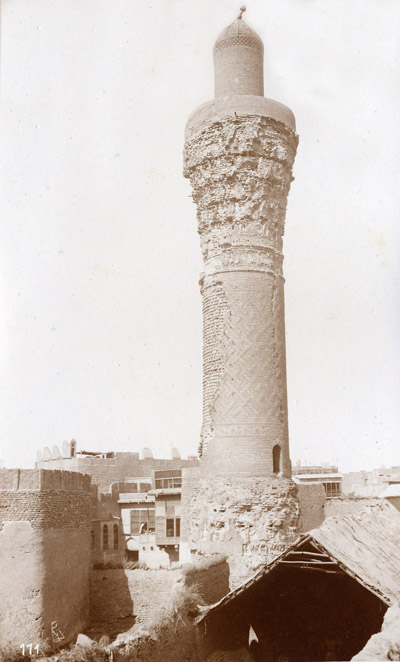
The minaret of Suq Al-Ghazl in 1911. It is the oldest surviving aspect of the mosque

The mosque dates from the Abbasid era and was commissioned by the 17th Abbasid Caliph, al-Muktafi (r. 902–908), as a Friday mosque for the sprawling palace complex erected by him and his father, Caliph al-Mu'tadid. Due to this, the mosque was often also called al-Qasr Mosque (Arabic: جامع القصر) which means the "mosque of the palace" in Arabic. Later the mosque was dubbed the Mosque of Caliph, which gave the current name Jami' al-Khulafa.

With construction starting in 902 the same year al-Muktafi became Caliph and was built on the grounds of Qasr al-Khulafa which also contained a prison and vaults which housed workmen who worked on the Qasr al-Hasani. Originally, the mosque was supposed to be used for personal use for the Caliph but was then opened to the public and remained open for the last four centuries of the Abbasid Caliphate's existence. Abbasid Caliphs would also take to the mosque and use it as their central place of worship until the 13th century. Residents would favor coming to the mosque and remained until close to night time to discuss various private affairs. The mosque was the second of the three great mosques of East Baghdad at the time of the Abbasids, the other two being al-Rusafa Mosque (which contained the tombs of Abbasid Tombs), and the Seljuk Mosque of the Sultan.

=== Post-Abbasid Caliphate (1258-1932) ===
As a result of its significant age, the mosque is one of the historic landmarks of the city of Baghdad. It was mentioned in Ibn Battuta’s travel record when he visited Baghdad in 1327. The mosque has also suffered through many wars. It was destroyed or heavily damaged when the Mongols sacked the city in 1258 and was rebuilt and restored in 1272. The present minaret was also built in 1279, during the Ilkhanate period.

Around 1779 and 1780, Suleiman the Great the ruler of the Mamluk state of Iraq renewed parts of the mosque and established a scientific madrasa that taught mental sciences with many scholars studying at the madrasa throughout its existence. During James Silk Buckingham's visit to Baghdad in 1816, al-Khulafa Mosque was one of the mosques he visited which was located in Souk al-Ghazil and noted how the remains of the mosque and the minaret looked like they were affected by "marks of violence." Due to the location of the mosque, Buckingham called it the "Souk al-Ghazil Mosque. He noted in his travels:

The body of the original building appears to have been destroyed by violence. No more remains of it at present than the minaret and a small portion of the outer walls. The former of these is a short, thick, heavy column, of the most graceless proportions, built of bricks, diagonally crossed, and varied on colours, as in the minaret of the Great Mosque at Mousul.

=== Restoration and later events (since 1960) ===
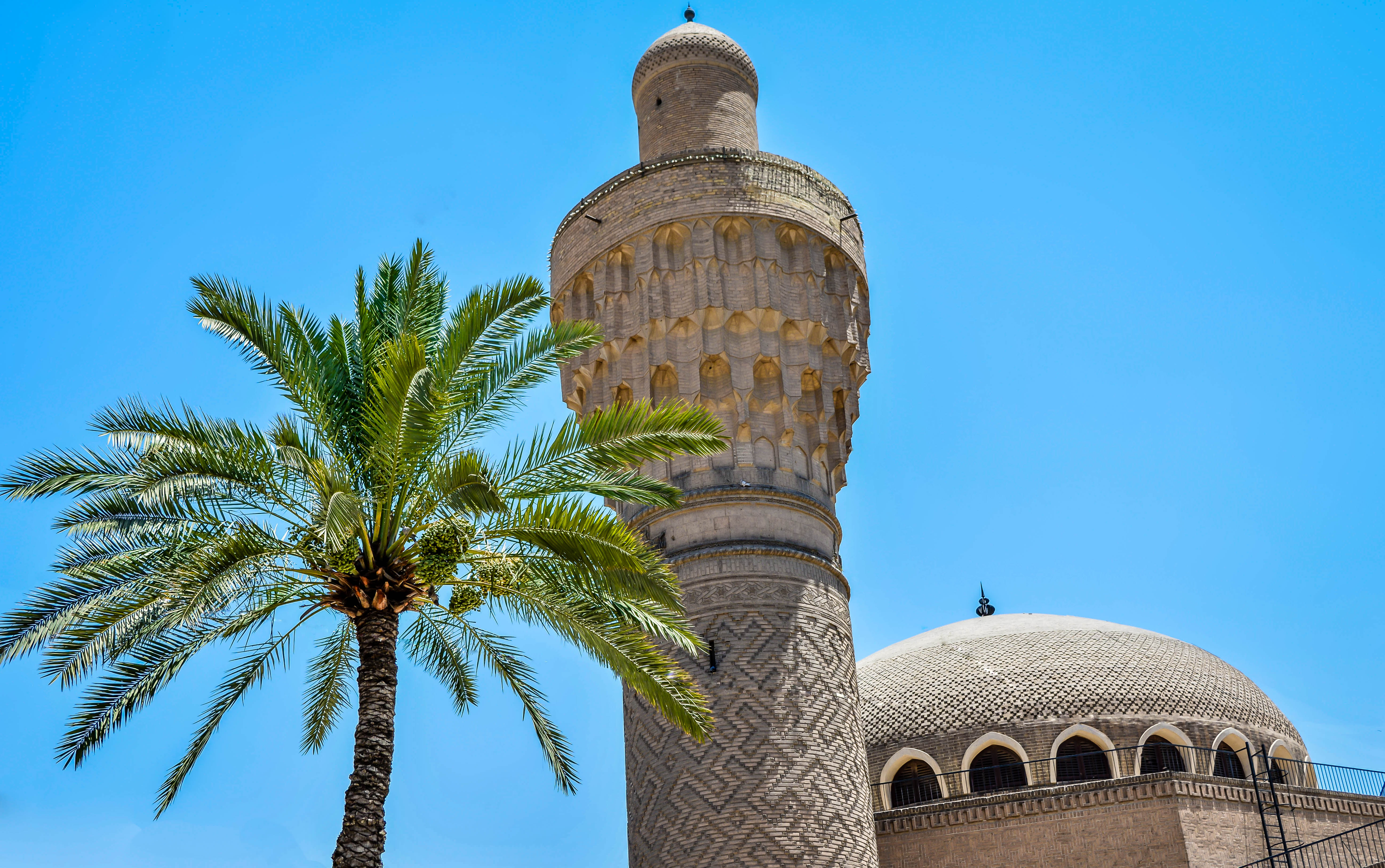
Detail of the minaret and dome, in 2016

The minaret was refurbished in 1960 and a project by the Ministry of Awqaf was carried out to rebuild the mosque and hire architect Mohamed Makiya for the major project. The project was completed in 1964 in the mosque's current form with Mohamed drafting proposals to rehabilitate the mosque in 1981. Makiya was a Baghdadi architect who was concerned in architectural heritage, and the many traditional ways they're built which would lead him to work on the project. While the modern project's site was smaller than that referred to in historical records, and was completed on a lower budget, Makiya managed to develop an accurate design for the mosque and its architecture which was extracted from various periods of Islamic architecture. Makiya has also decided to keep using traditional Iraqi bricks as the main building resource for the mosque to reflect the local identity. Makiya's mosque restoration later impacted his work as he would design future buildings that reflected traditional culture without neglecting modern architectural features. The project was Makiya's first important work.

Recognized as Baghdad's oldest surviving mosque, the mosque was notably visited by British ethnomusicologist Jean Jenkins in 1970 who recorded a three-minute track of a Qu'ran reading session during Friday prayers at the mosque which would later be aired on BBC radio 4 as an ending to a program from that period which aired Sufi music from Kabul, also recorded by Jenkins. The recordings intended to show an example of Islamic harmony.

Eventually, in the early 1980s, there was a plan drafted to expand the mosque Makiya after former Iraqi president Saddam Hussein declared the mosque a masterpiece reminiscent of Iraq's Abbasid past. Hussein had notably expressed great interest in religious and mosque designs during this period. The plan would've seen the demolishment of many of its surroundings but the plan was never put into development.

Among the scholars who held the position of imam and rhetoric in the mosque was Sheikh Jalal al-Din al-Hanafi, who was the imam of the mosque for several decades and helped in the maintenance and preservation of the mosque such as the fence which is decorated by Islamic calligraphy. Al-Hanafi was also bold in his position as he prevented the installation of loudspeakers in the mosque and instead preferred to do the call of prayer on the pulpit. This decision was because loudspeakers "annoy non-Muslims, children, the sick, and the elderly, and there is no need for them. People watch and know prayer times from the radio and television." Al-Hanafi was known to have a great love for al-Khulafa Mosque due to its age and architecture; to this day, the mosque is sometimes associated with al-Hanafi since he spent much time in the mosque. It should also be noted that al-Hanafi was the last scholar to ever study at the mosque.

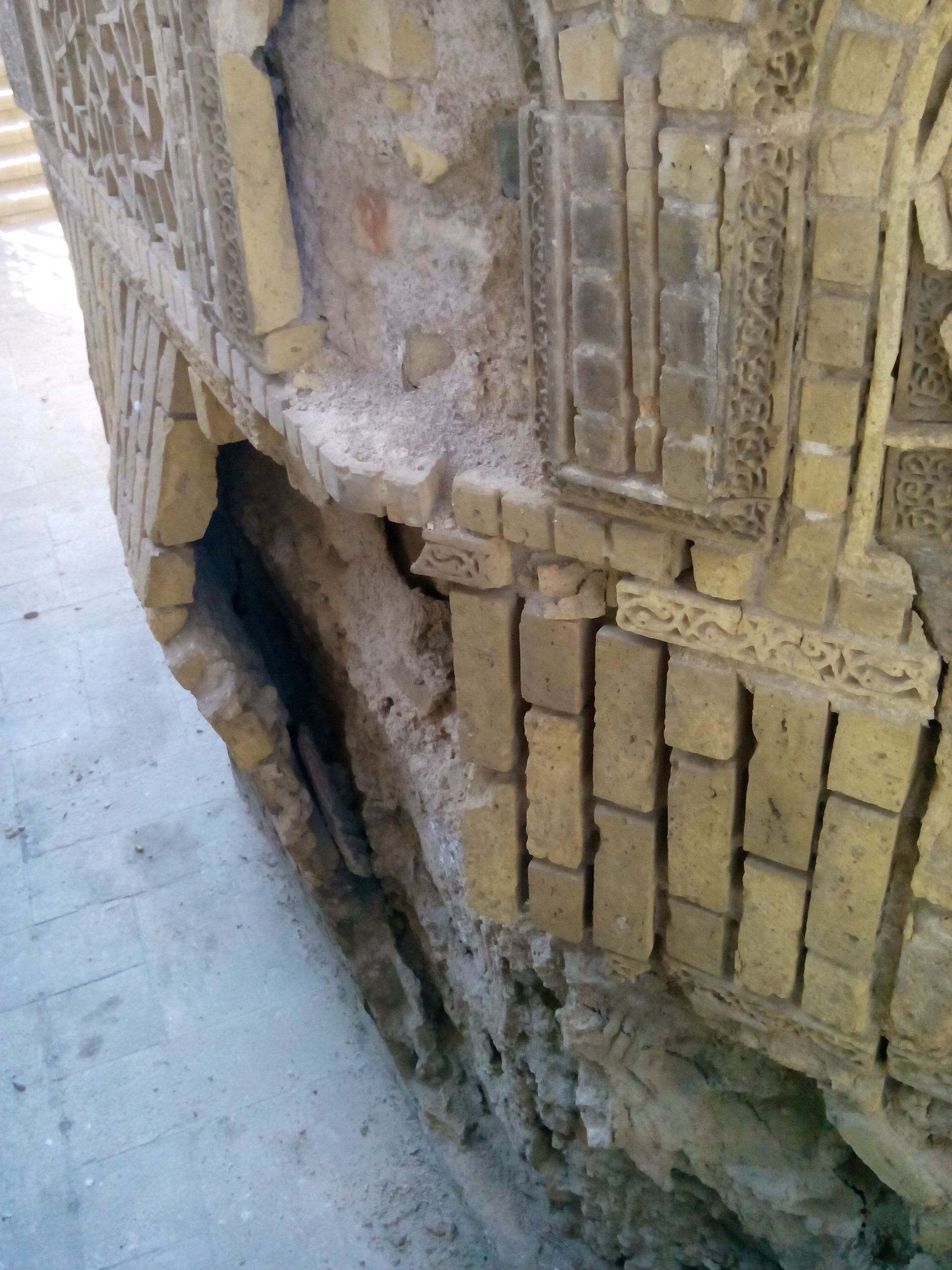
Part of the damages below the minaret.

However, there is a concern of its collapsing due to the lack of maintenance allegedly stemming from the sectarian segregation between the Sunni-oriented mosque and the Shi'i-majority government. Because of the minaret's tilt, the mosque is better known by locals as "al-Ahdab" (Arabic: الأحدب), meaning "the hunchback". Despite its important historical background, the mosque has also lost its relevancy among the Baghdadi public eye throughout the years in favor of Souk al-Ghazali.

A spokesman for the Ministry of Culture, Ahmed al-Olayawi, commented on the delay in restoring the mosque by saying that the rehabilitation of the mosque and its minaret is not easy, because this site extends for hundreds of years and is considered a historical landmark of Baghdad, and therefore it needs deep studies before starting. A British committee of experts is currently studying the mosque to rehabilitate the mosque. The Sunni Endowment Office has also concluded an agreement with UNESCO in 2017 in order to preserve the mosque.

As of 2024, the mosque remains in a dire state of neglect with a dilapidated sign on its gate reading “The mosque is closed for maintenance purposes”. Due to the loss of many historic landmarks around Baghdad in recent years, the mosque is considered endangered, and Independent Arabia reported the Sunni Endowment Office had no information about the mosque and its many issues. The paper also noted the lack of knowledge of the mosque's history and significance among the locals during an opinion survey.

== Architecture ==
=== Current layout and structure ===
When restoring the mosque, architect Mohamed Makiya wanted the mosque's design to be as accurate to Islamic architecture during the Abbasid period as possible, as such the intention was to make the mosque as if it had never been demolished previously. Three gates lead to the chapel of the mosque which is octagonal and topped with a 14-meter dome decorated with Kufic script. The mosque was colored in the same yellowish colors to match the color of the minaret and the mosque is decorated in many Islamic and geometric shapes.

The exterior walls of the main haram are covered in bricks with varying shades of yellow arranged in geometric patterns with the interior walls being covered by precast concrete. Arches of the mosque are also topped by geometric patterns. The mosque is topped by a large dome covered in the same yellow geometric brickwork that covers the entire mosque's façade and matches with the minaret. The interior of the dome is covered in various arabesque patterns.

The mosque

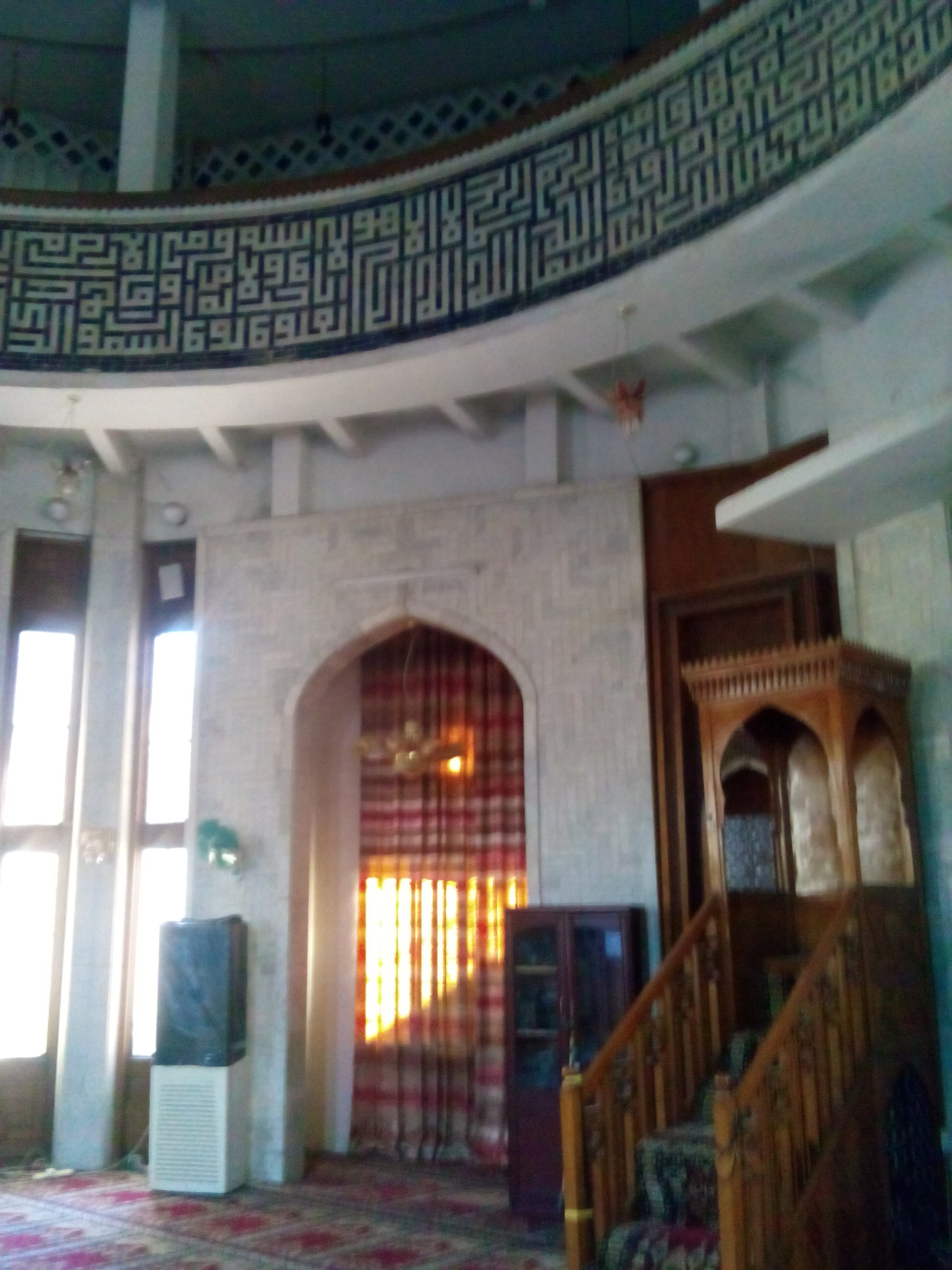
The prayer space of the mosque

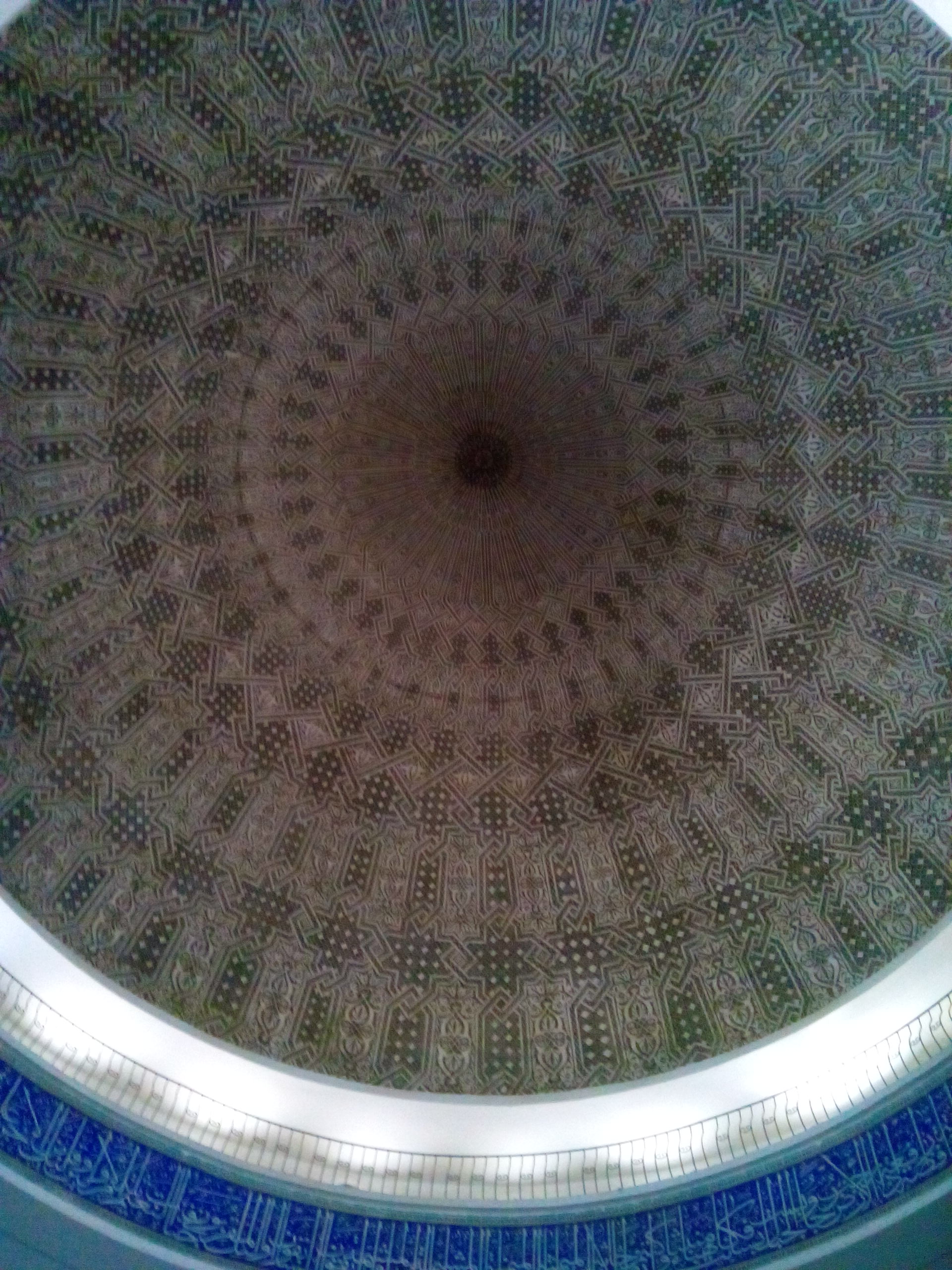
Interior detail of the Khulafa Mosque's big dome

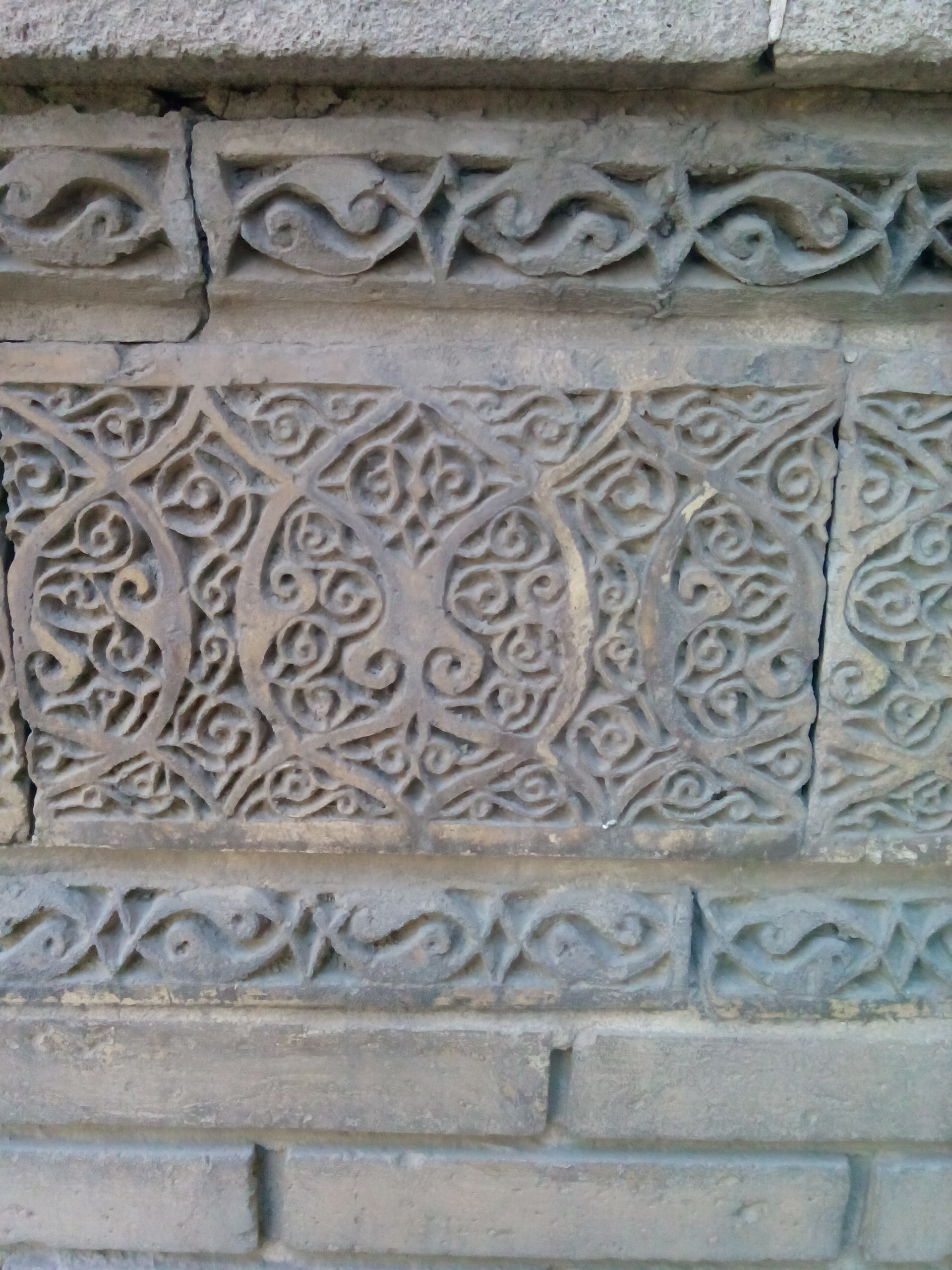
Islamic decoration on the mosque's stones and bricks

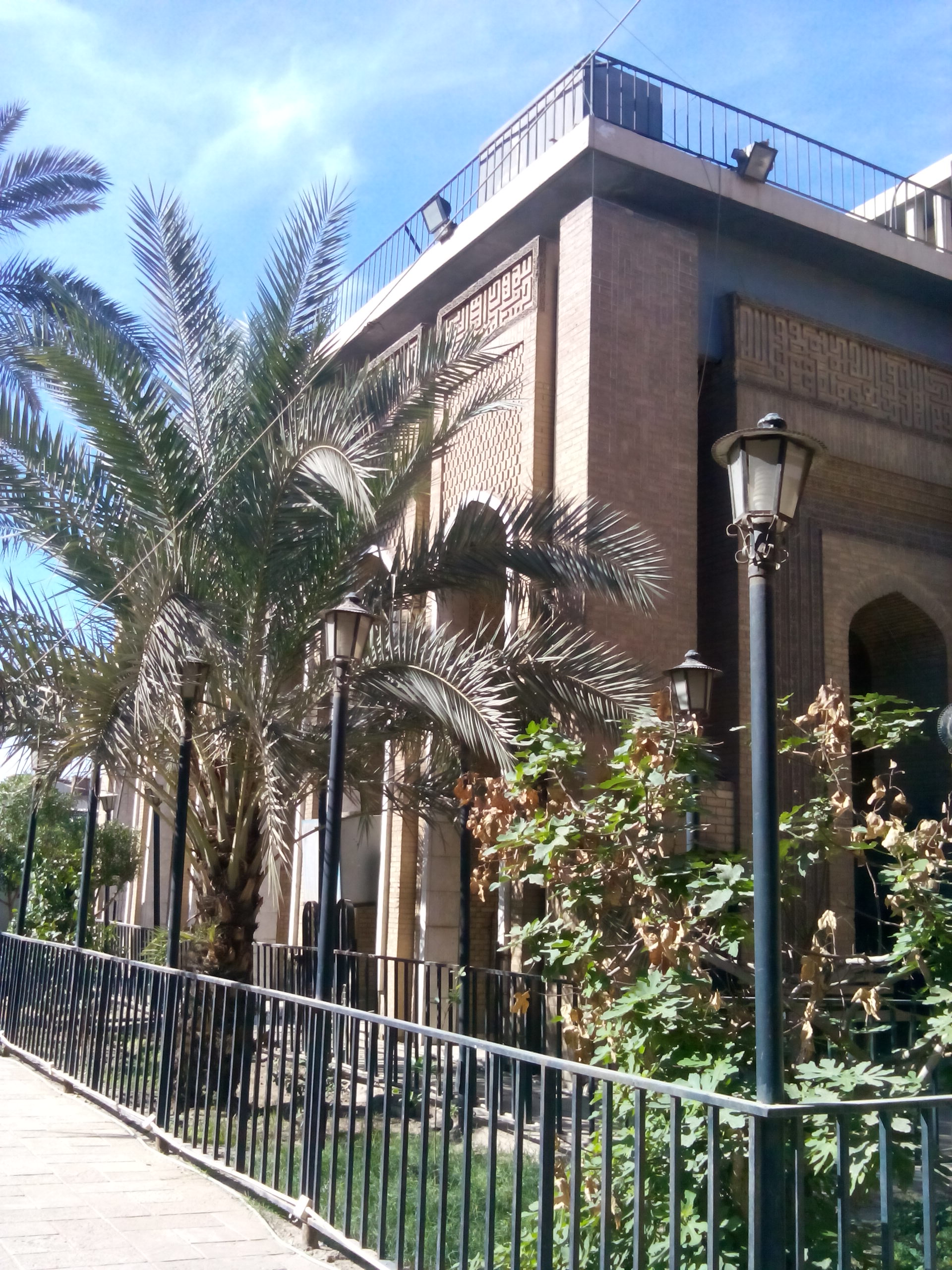
The exterior of the mosque's building

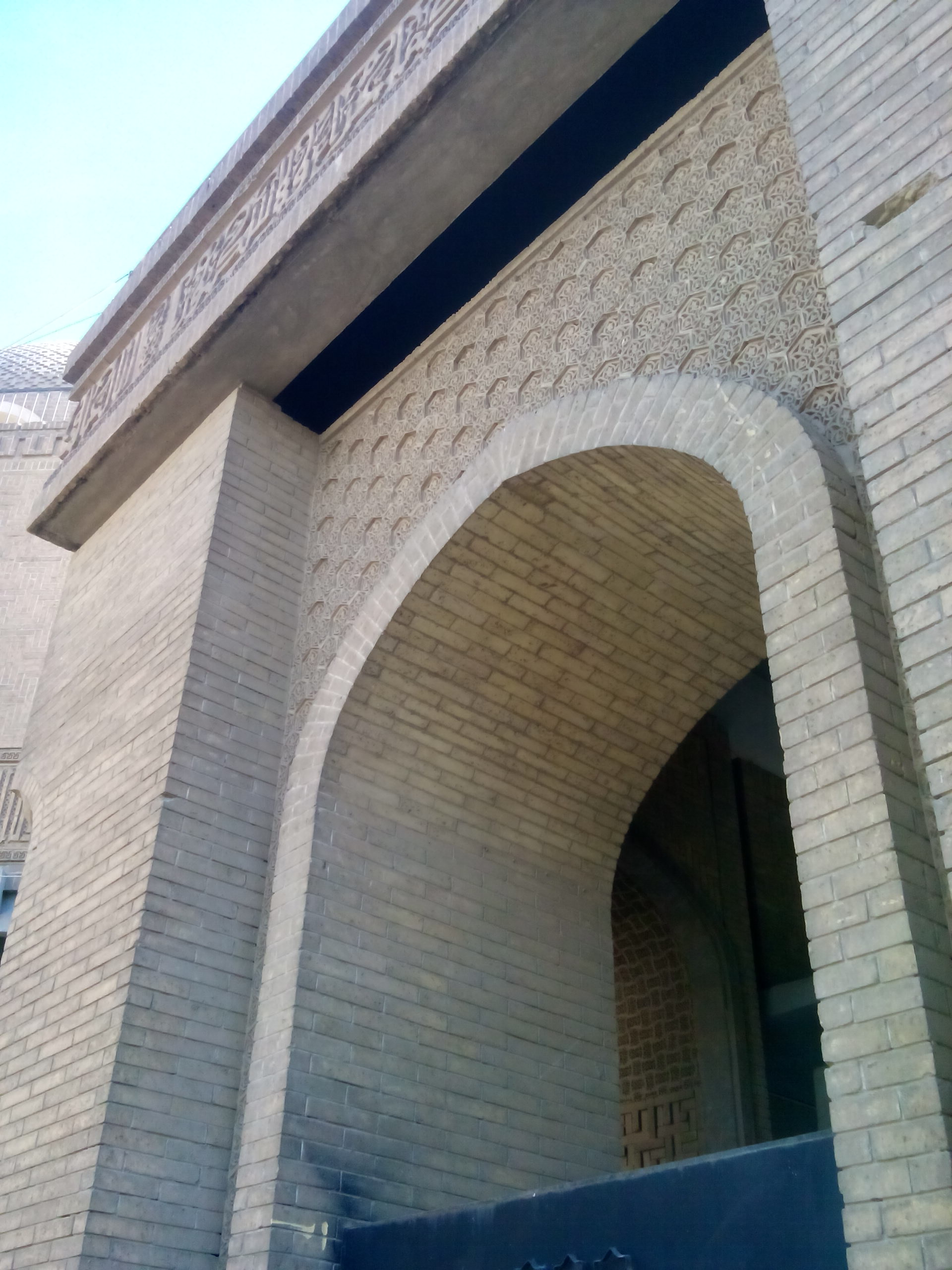
A window

=== Minaret ===
The most significant part of the mosque is its minaret which dates back the Ilkhanid period and is the most preserved part of the mosque. It is set on the southeast corner of the sahn and constructed in brick and mortar. It is about 35 meters high with a cylindrical shape that includes four layers of muqarnas supporting the base of the minaret. The frame of the minaret is engraved with Kufic inscriptions and Islamic geometric patterns. The minaret is similar in terms of design to the minaret of Bastam in Iran, which was built in 1120, and is similar to the minaret of al-Nukhailah Mosque.

The minaret

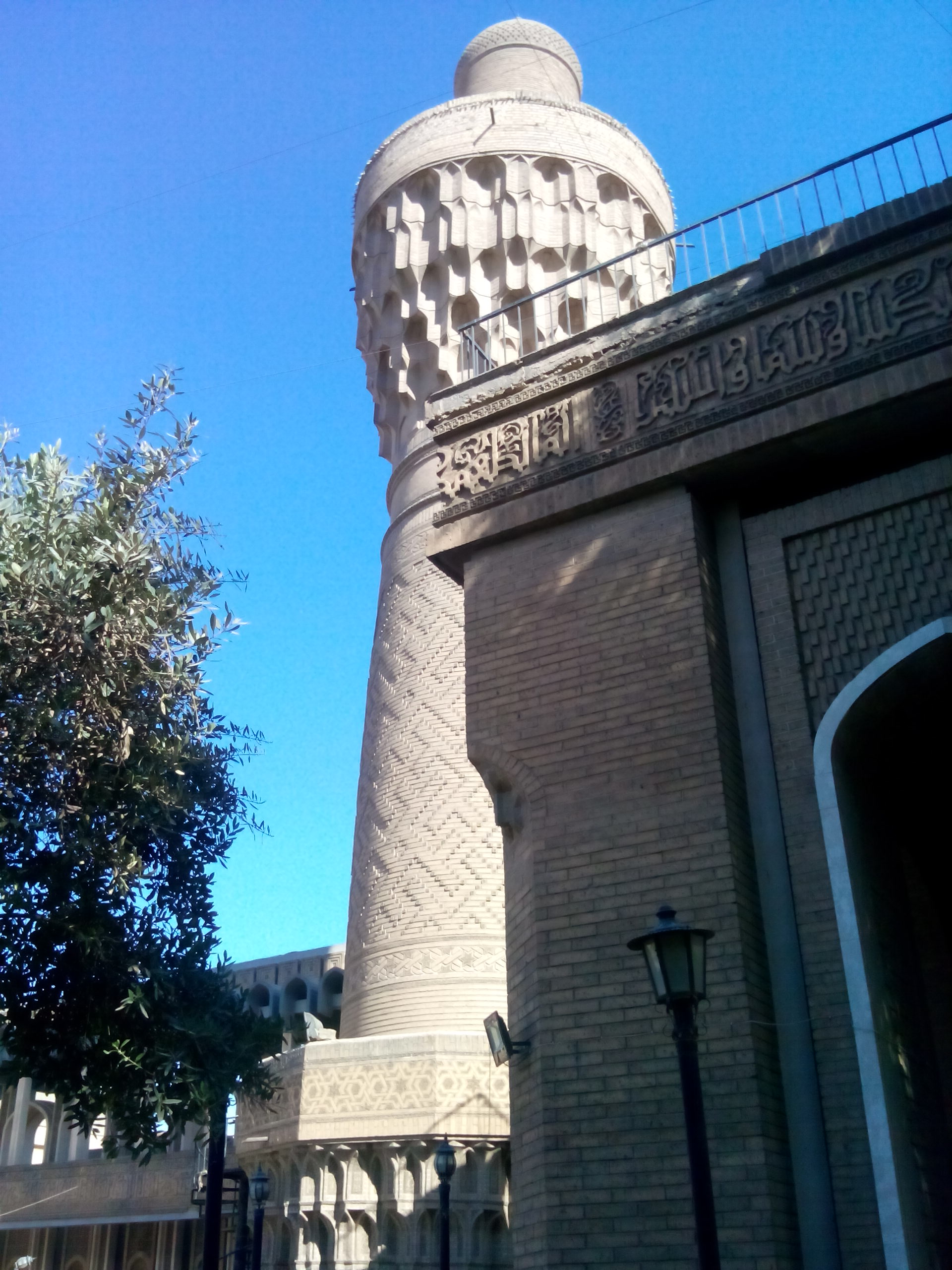
The minaret from ground level

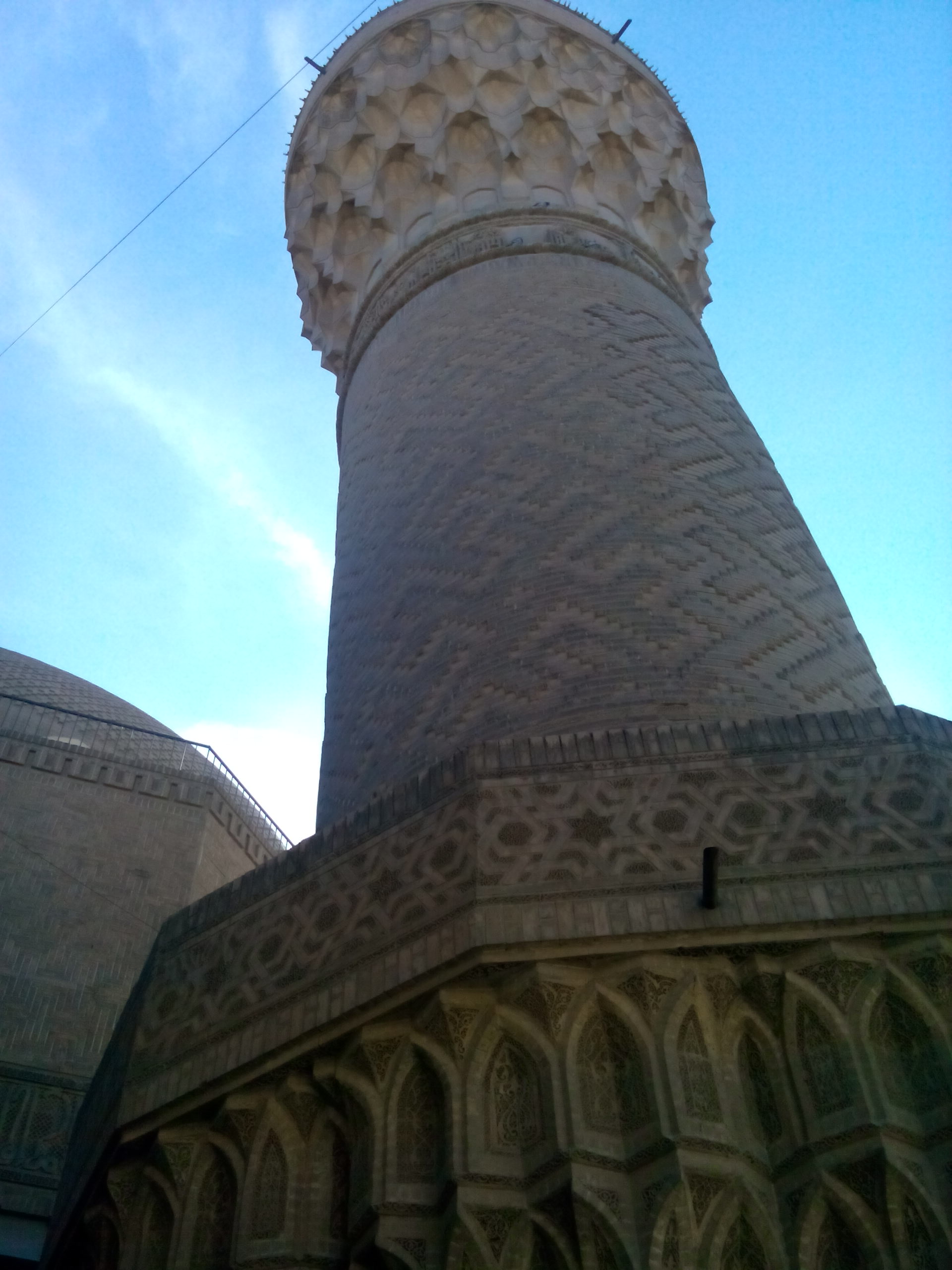
Ground level view of the first bands of the muqarnas and decorations

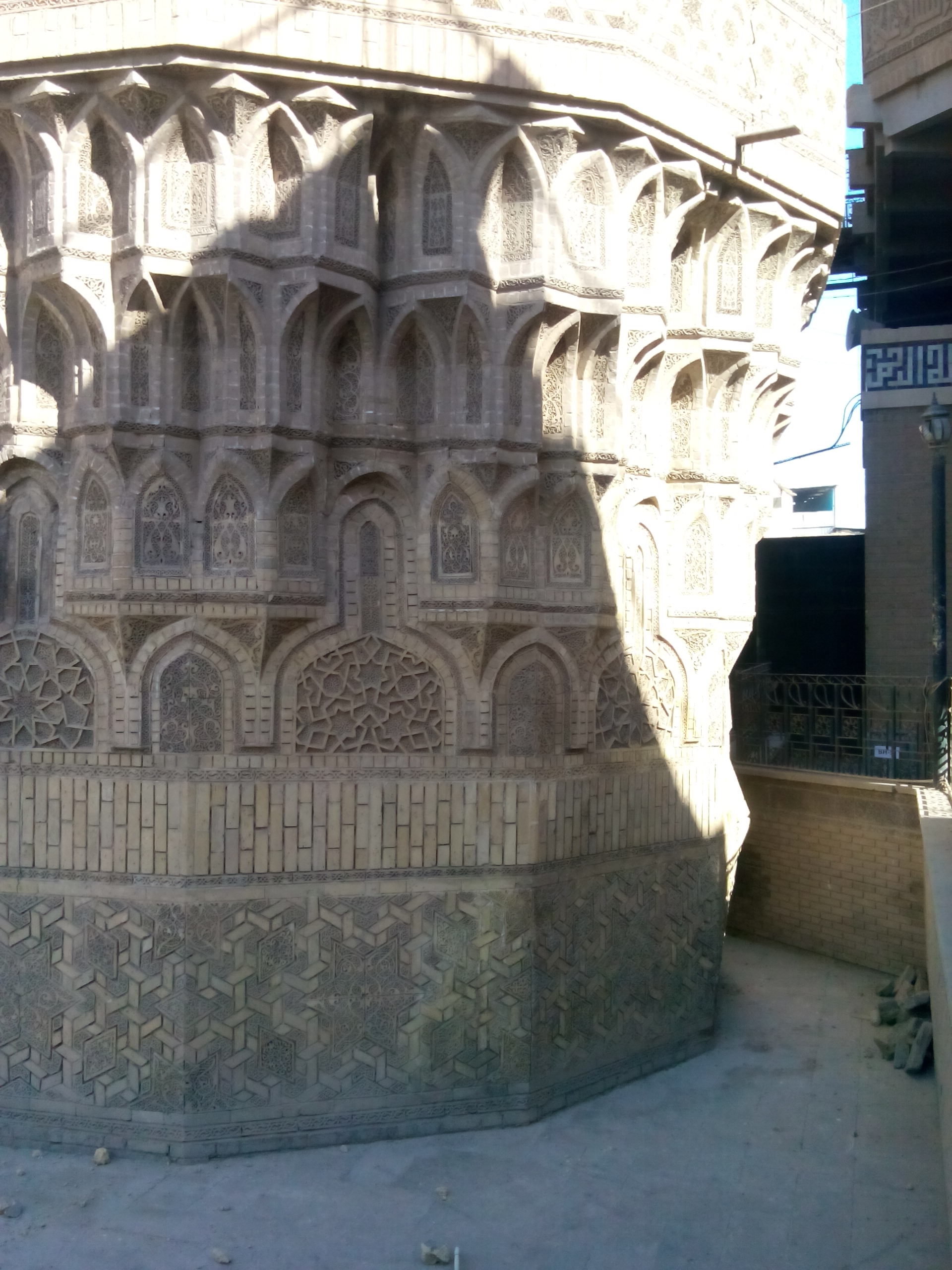
The four bands of muqarnas below the minaret

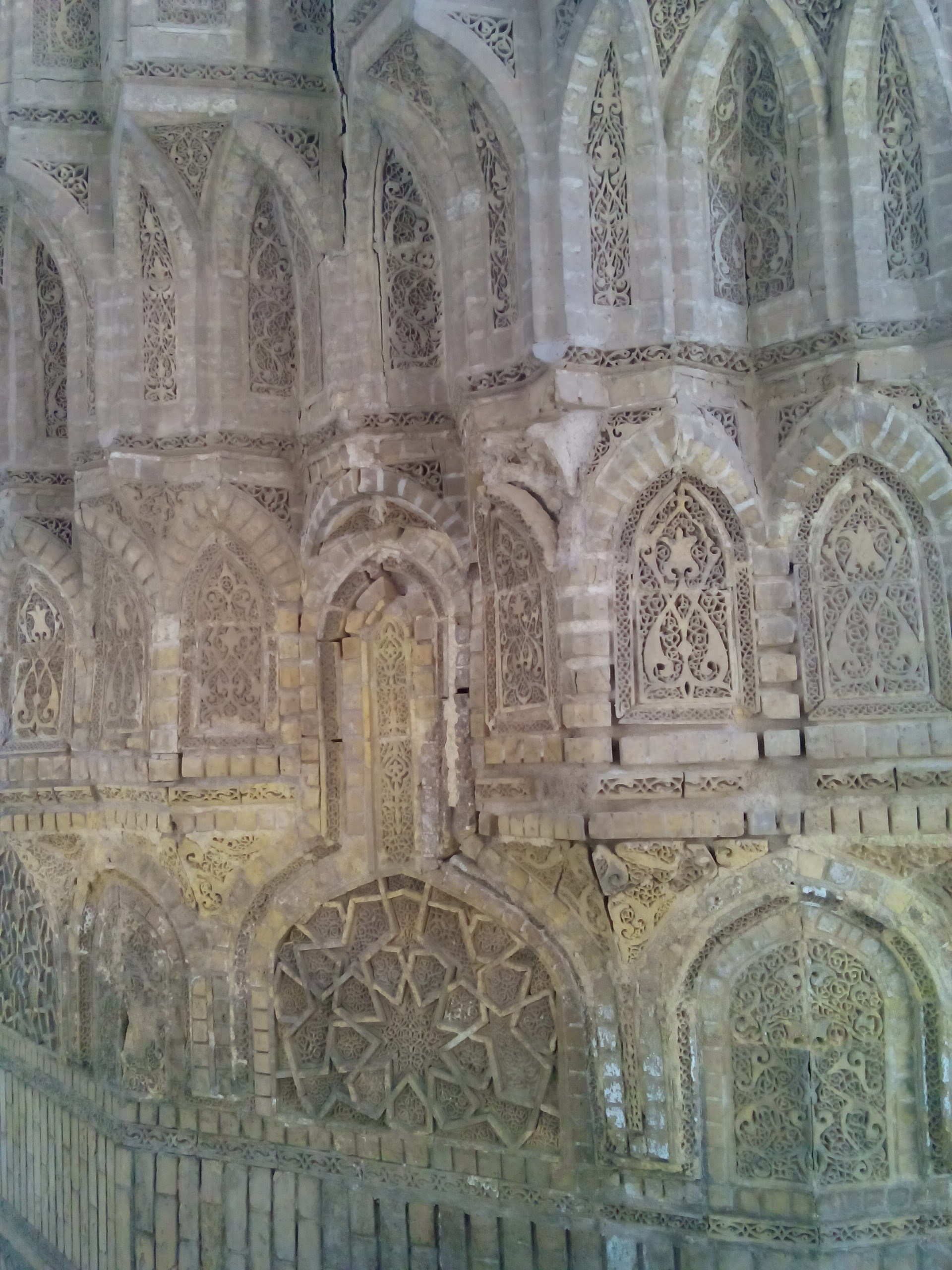
Closeup of the muqarnas and their decorations

== See also ==
- Islam in Iraq
- List of mosques in Baghdad
- Abbasid landmarks
  - Abbasid Palace
  - Abu Hanifa Mosque
  - Haydar-Khana Mosque
  - Mustansiriya Madrasa
