= Jean Jenkins =

Jean Jenkins may refer to:

- Jean Jenkins (politician) (born 1938), Australian educator and senator for Western Australia
- Jean Jenkins (ethnomusicologist) (1922–1990), American-born ethnomusicologist
