= Khuld Palace =

Abbasid Caliphal palace

Coordinates: 33°21′N 44°22′E

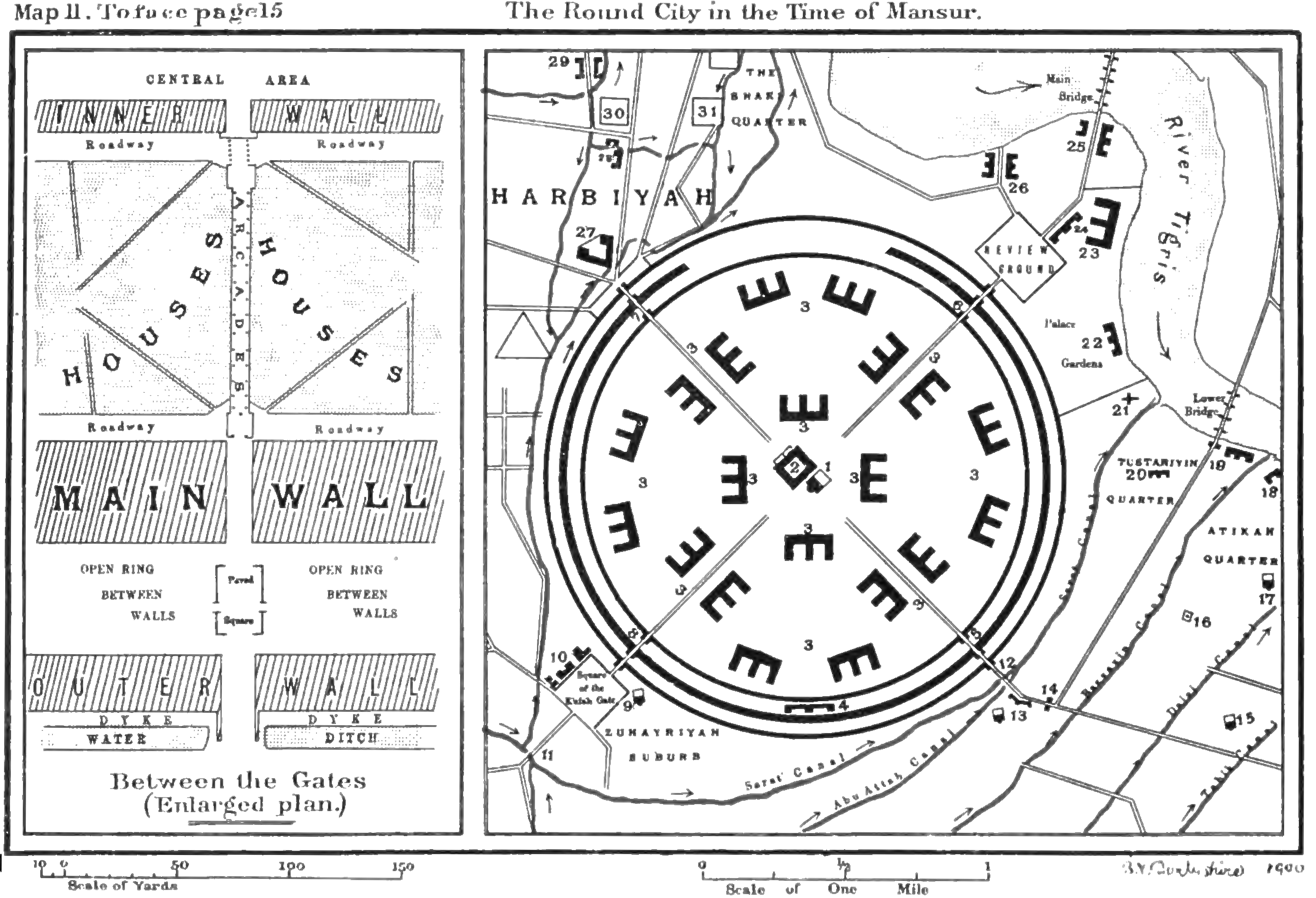
The Round City of Baghdad in the time of Caliph al-Mansur. The site of the Khuld Palace is No. 23

The Khuld Palace (Arabic: قصر الخلد, romanized: Qaṣr al-Khuld, lit. 'Palace of Eternity') was one of the principal caliphal palaces in Baghdad during the early Abbasid Caliphate.

== History ==
Baghdad was founded in 762 by the second Abbasid caliph, al-Mansur (r. 754–775). The main part of the original city was the Round City, with the first caliphal palace, the Palace of the Golden Gate, at its centre. In 773, al-Mansur began construction of another palace on an elongated, mile-long stretch of land between the walls of the Round City and the western bank of the Tigris River. The palace and its extensive gardens was located between the Round City's Khurasan Gate and the western entrance of the city's Main Bridge of Boats leading across the Tigris. Al-Mansur reportedly chose this site because at this spot the Tigris bank was the highest above the river, and thus protected the palace from the ubiquitous insects along the river bank. The site was noted for its fresh air. It was named "Palace of Eternity" (Qaṣr al-Khuld) from a passage in the Quran alluding to Paradise, the "Palace of Eternity promised to the God-fearing", because its gardens were said to almost rival the garden of Paradise. According to Ya'qubi, before the palace was a large review ground, adjacent to the royal stables.

While the Palace of the Golden Gate was the official caliphal residence, after the Khuld Palace was inaugurated in 775 al-Mansur as well as his successors up to Harun al-Rashid (r. 786–809) frequently used both residences, with Harun reportedly favouring the Khuld during his stays in Baghdad. The palace, like the nearby Palace of Zubaydah, suffered extensive damage from stone missiles during the Siege of Baghdad (812–813). The Khuld Palace was likely in ruins at the end of the siege, although at least one source claims that al-Ma'mun (r. 813–833) stayed there when he came to Baghdad in 819, before the Hasani Palace was prepared for his residence. Following the move of the capital to Samarra under al-Mu'tasim (r. 833–842), the remains of the structure further decayed, and it remained in a ruined state until 979, when the Buyid ruler 'Adud al-Dawla decided to build the Al-'Adudi Hospital on its site.

== Sources ==
- Duri, A. A. (1960). "Baghdād". In Gibb, H. A. R.; Kramers, J. H.; Lévi-Provençal, E.; Schacht, J.; Lewis, B. & Pellat, Ch. (eds.). The Encyclopaedia of Islam, Second Edition. Volume I: A–B. Leiden: E. J. Brill. pp. 894–908. doi:10.1163/1573-3912_islam_COM_0084. OCLC 495469456.
- Le Strange, Guy (1900). Baghdad During the Abbasid Caliphate. From Contemporary Arabic and Persian Sources. Oxford: Clarendon Press. OCLC 257810905.
