= Mohamed Makiya =

Iraqi architect (1914–2015)

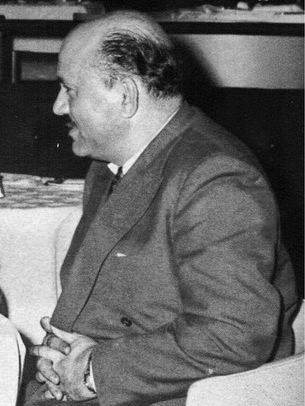
Mohamed Makiya in the 1960s

Mohamed Makiya (Mohammed Saleh Makiya 1914-2015) (Arabic: محمد مكية) was an Iraqi architect and one of the first Iraqis to gain formal qualifications in architecture. He is noted for establishing Iraq's first department of architecture at the University of Baghdad and for his architectural designs which incorporated Islamic motifs such as calligraphy in an effort to combine Arabic architectural elements within contemporary works.

== Early life and education ==
Mohamed Saleh Makiya, son of Bahiya and Saleh Abd al-Aziz Makiya, was born in Baghdad into a family of clothing merchants. His father died when he was an infant, and his mother went to live with his uncle.

At the Baghdad Central Secondary School, he excelled in mathematics and showed sufficient promise to be selected as one of 50 students to be awarded a scholarship to study in England. He travelled to England in 1935 and spent his first year learning English and preparing for the matriculation exams. He enrolled at Liverpool University, School of Architecture, graduating with a bachelor's degree in architecture (1941) and a diploma of civic design, (1942). He later enrolled at King's College, Cambridge, where he completed a PhD (1946). His dissertation was entitled The Influence of Climate on Architecture in the Mediterranean Region.

In 1941, while undertaking post-graduate studies in England, he met his future wife, English-born, Margaret Crawford, who later travelled to Baghdad to marry him, in spite of some resistance from her family. In 1956 he was the recipient of a Fulbright scholarship, which allowed him to study in the US.

== Career ==
When he returned to Baghdad in 1946, he was one of the first Iraqis to have obtained formal qualifications in architecture. At that time, Iraq had no tradition of using architects; rather a continuous tradition of both domestic and public buildings relying on ancient building techniques was evident, but designers rarely attached their names to their designs. The concept of an architect was so foreign that the Arabic language had no word to describe the profession. However, by the mid-20th century, Iraq was undergoing a period of 'modernisation' and many traditional houses were being demolished, paving the way for contemporary designs.

The challenge for contemporary architects was how to incorporate traditional design elements while using modern materials and techniques. Mohamed Makiya, along with local architects, who had been trained in Europe, including, Makkiyya al-Jadiri, Mazlum, Qatan Adani and Rifat Chadirji took up this challenge, and in so doing, were pivotal to the development of a distinctly national style of architecture.

Following his return to Baghdad, Makiya established Makiya & Associates, an architectural and planning consultancy, and later opened branch offices in Bahrain (1967); Muscat, Oman (1971) and London (1974). His first important commission was for al-Khulafa Mosque (1960–63) for which he developed a design extracted from the 9th-century Abbasid mosque that formerly stood on the same site, and built it around the surviving minaret. This mosque was situated in the same suburb as Makiya's place of birth.

In the early years of his practice, Makiya struggled. Insufficient commercial work meant that he had to find a paid work. He was employed at the Directorate of General Municipalities in Baghdad, where he worked as an urban planner and architect. His wife worked as a secondary school teacher during these years. By the 1960s, however, he began to receive important commissions and by the 1970s, his Bahrain office was thriving. He continued to exhibit a preoccupation with regional architectural issues - local built environment, architectural heritage, folklore and local craftsmanship. For this design focus, he was often known as "the Islamic architect."

His interest in Islamic art and design led him to collect artworks and photographs. Later his photographs were used to illustrate books on Islamic architecture such as Arab Architecture: Past and Present published by the Centre for Middle Eastern & Islamic Studies, University of Durham, 1983. He also supported the arts in practical ways. In the absence of art galleries in 1940s' Baghdad, Makiya opened his private home to host the first contemporary art exhibition featuring works by artist, Jawad Saleem.

In 1959, he founded Iraq's first architectural department within the engineering department at University of Baghdad, became its dean and held the position until 1968. As an educator, he encouraged his students to take an interest in traditional Iraqi design and encouraged them draw street elevations of traditional buildings.

By the early 1970s, he had fallen from favor with the Ba'athist regime and his name appeared on a Ba'athist-compiled list of those who were to be arrested. He was working in Bahrain when he learned this alarming news, but was in the process of establishing an office in London. He and his family relocated to London. While living in London, he established the Kufa Gallery In London as a focus for Islamic and Arab art

In 1980 the Mayor of Baghdad invited him to return to Baghdad for the purpose of participating in a major rebuilding program. After being given a guarantee of his personal safety, Makiya decided to return, but in family discussions, it was decided that his son, Kanan, should not travel to Baghdad, but instead remain in England where he would manage the London branch of Makiya & Associates.

Mohamed Makiya spent his final years, in exile, living in London's Bayswater, where his wife died in 2013. Makiya also died in London, in 2015, at the age of 101. He was survived by his son Kanan (b. 1949) and a daughter, Hind (b. 1952). His son, Kanan Makiya, had also trained as an architect, but left the family business to become an academic in the United States.

== Work ==
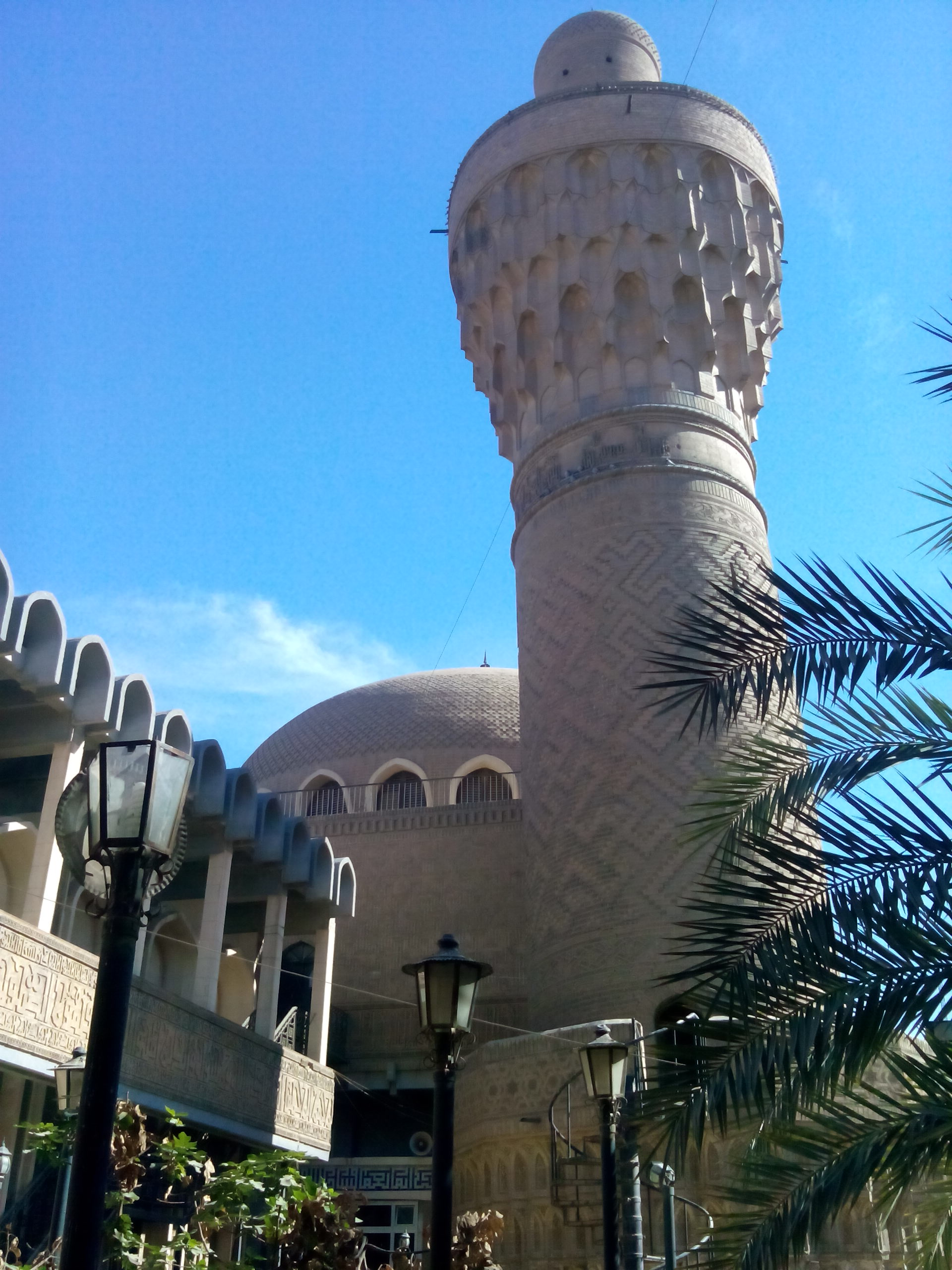
The restoration of al-Khulafa Mosque in Baghdad was Makiya's first major commission.

For a time, he was one of Saddam Hussein's top architects, participated in Hussein's multi-million dollar rebuilding projects and helped build Hussein's palaces. He also built numerous commercial buildings, including banks, libraries, government offices and private residences. In addition, he won competitions for designs for public projects, such as the Baghdad State Mosque and the Tikrit Ceremonial Parade Grounds, that never came to fruition.

Major public works

- Al-Khulafa Mosque (1960–63) - based on a design extracted from the 9th-century Abbasid mosque and built around the surviving minaret
- Rafidain Bank, Basra (1970)
- Sheikh Mubarak Building, Bahrain (1973)
- International Hilton Hotel, Dubai (1974)
- Siddique Mosque, Doha (1978)
- Al-Andalus housing complex, Doha (1983)
- Kuwait State Mosque (1978-1984)
- Headquarters for the Regional Arab Organisers, Kuwait (1982–87)
- Headquarters of the League of Arab States, Tunis (1983)
- Great Mosque, Oman (1995-2002)

Publications

Makiya contributed many articles to newspapers and scholarly journals as well as chapters in monographs.

- (Sole-authored) Turāth al-rasm al-Baghdādī by Mohamed Makiya, Wizārat al-Iʻlām, al-Lajnah al-Taḥḍīrīyah li-Mihrajān al-Wāsiṭī, 1972
- (Sole-authored) Baghdad by Mohammed Makiya, London, Al-Warrak Publishing Ltd, first published in 1962 and reprinted in 2005
- (Joint-authored) Ḫawāṭir as-sinīn by Moḥamed Makīya and Rašīd al- Ḫaiyūn, Bairūt Dār as-Sāqī, 2005
- (Contributor) Third World Planning Review, Volume 10, Liverpool University Press, 1988

== Legacy ==
At least three books have been dedicated to his contribution to architecture.

- Post-Islamic Classicism: A Visual Essay on the Architecture of Mohammed Makiya, by Kanan Makiya (Saqi Books, 1990)
- Contemporary Iraqi Art: A Journey with the Iraqi Architect Mohamed Makiya, by Ahmed Naji Al-Saeed
- Mohamed Makiya: A Century of Architecture and Life and Mohamed’s Son by Khalid al-Sultani

In 2014, Tamayouz Excellence Awards announced that it would award the annual Mohamed Makiya Prize designed to celebrate the best of Architecture.

In 2016, Iraq honored two of its most celebrated architects, Mohammed Makiya and Zaha Hadid, with postage stamps.

== See also ==
- Iraqi art
- List of Iraqi artists
