= Thurayya Palace =

Abbasid Caliphal palace

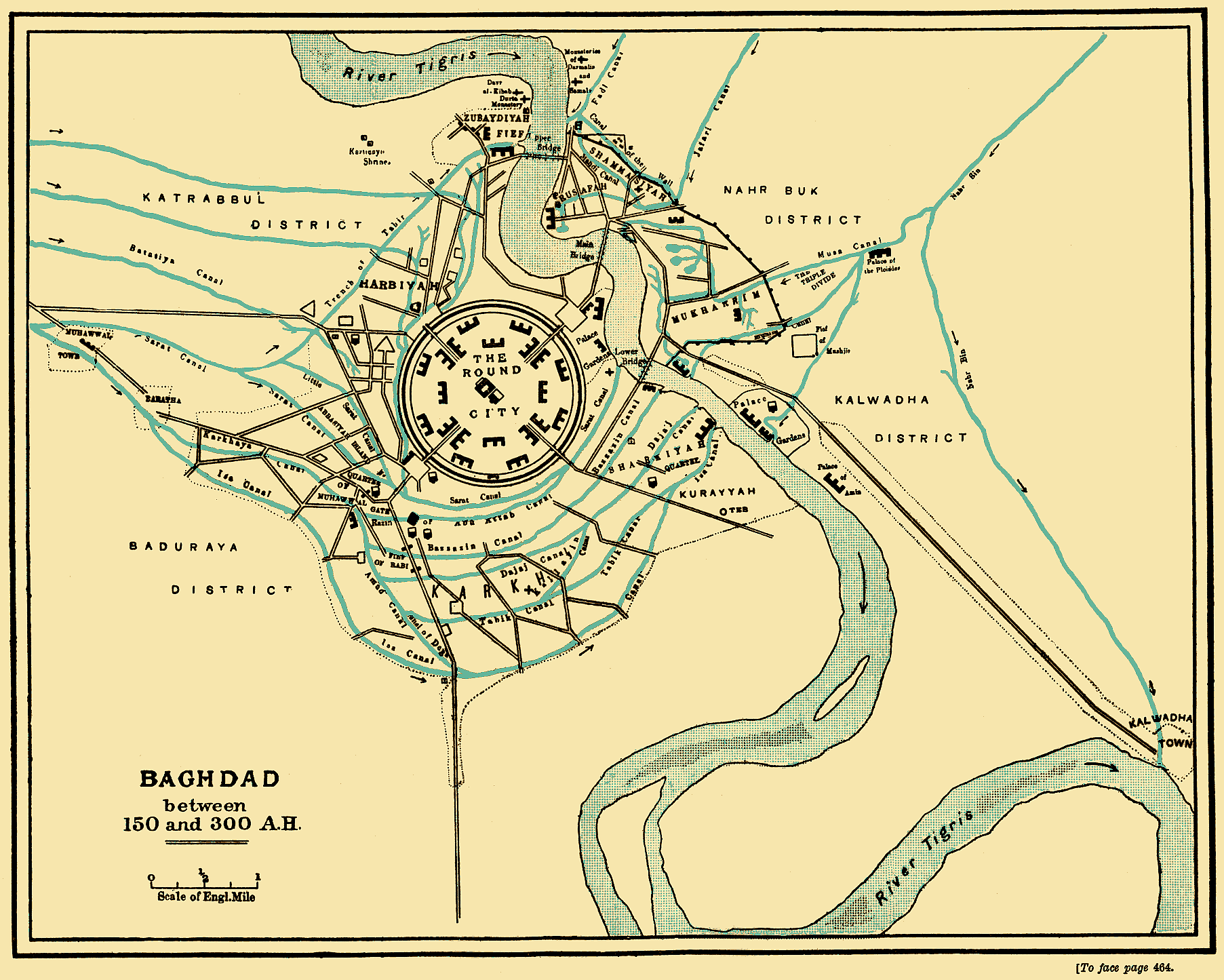
Map of Abbasid-era Baghdad by William Muir. The Thurayya ('Palace of the Pleiades') is shown in the east, near to the Great Divide of the Musa Canal

The Thurayya Palace (Arabic: قصر الثريا, romanized: Qaṣr al-Thurayyā, lit. 'Palace of the Pleiades') was a caliphal palace built in East Baghdad by the Abbasid caliph al-Mu'tadid (r. 892–902).

It lay at the Musa Canal, adjacent to the Great Divide, where the canal split in three, some two miles east from the older Hasani Palace, and most likely outside the city wall built around East Baghdad in the 11th century. The Thurayya, Hasani, Firdus, and Taj palaces combined into a sprawling palace complex, the "Abode of the Caliphate" (Dar al-Khilafat), comprising several major and minor residences and gardens. This remained the main caliphal residence for the remainder of the Abbasid Caliphate.

The Thurayya was connected with the Hasani by an underground passage, which allowed the caliph, his harem, and his servants to move between the palaces unseen. This passage continued to be used until the great floods of 1074 flooded the entirety of East Baghdad. The historian Mas'udi reports that the palace's construction cost 400,000 gold dinars.

== Sources ==
- Duri, A. A. (1960). "Baghdād". In Gibb, H. A. R.; Kramers, J. H.; Lévi-Provençal, E.; Schacht, J.; Lewis, B. & Pellat, Ch. (eds.). The Encyclopaedia of Islam, Second Edition. Volume I: A–B. Leiden: E. J. Brill. pp. 894–908. doi:10.1163/1573-3912_islam_COM_0084. OCLC 495469456.
- Le Strange, Guy (1922). Baghdad During the Abbasid Caliphate. From Contemporary Arabic and Persian Sources (Second ed.). Oxford: Clarendon Press.
