= Great Mosque of al-Mansur =

Former chief Friday mosque of Baghdad, Iraq, during the Abbasid era

- جامع المنصور
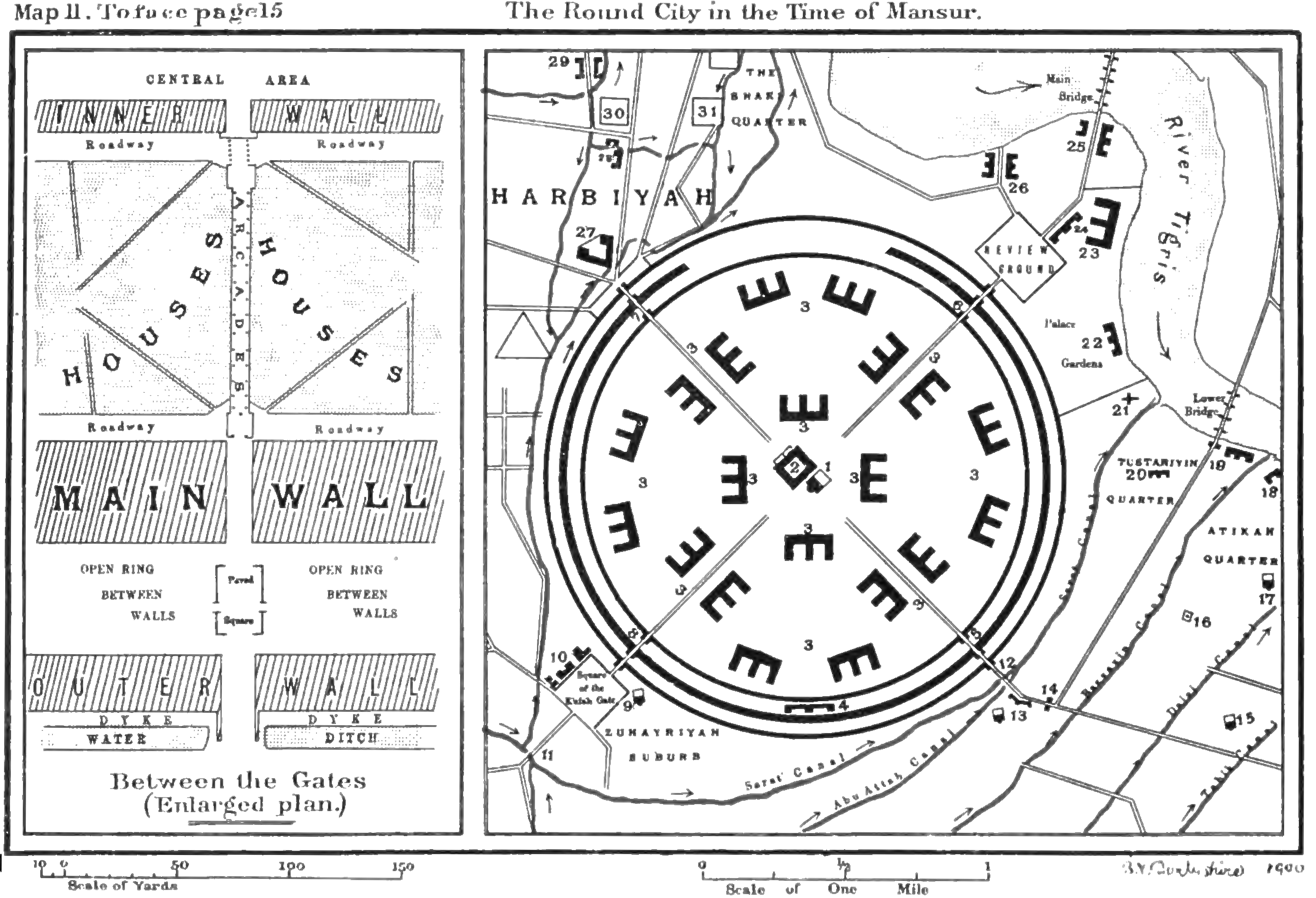
- The Round City of Baghdad in the time of Caliph al-Mansur, with the Great Mosque in the centre (No. 1)

Religion
- Affiliation: Islam (former)
- Ecclesiastical or organizational status: Friday mosque (former)
- Status: Destroyed

Location
- Location: Baghdad, Baghdad Governorate
- Country: Iraq

Architecture
- Type: Islamic architecture
- Style: Abbasid
- Completed: 763 CE
- Destroyed: After 1327 CE

Specifications
- Minaret: One (destroyed)
- Materials: Bricks; timber

The Great Mosque of al-Mansur (Arabic: جامع المنصور, romanized: Djāmiʿ al-Manṣūr) was the chief Friday mosque of Baghdad during the Abbasid Caliphate.

When the Moroccan scholar and explorer, Ibn Battutah visited the city in 1327, he reported the mosque as still standing, but it disappeared at a later, unknown date; no trace of it survives today.

== History and description ==
Baghdad was founded in 762 by the second Abbasid caliph, al-Mansur (r. 754–775). The main part of the original city was the Round City, with the caliphal Palace of the Golden Gate and the adjacent Great Mosque at its centre.

The Great Mosque was built at the southeastern side of the palace, after the latter had been completed. As a result, the mosque was not correctly directed towards Mecca (the qibla), as the mosque's outline had to conform to the existing palace walls. The Great Mosque of al-Mansur was the first mosque to be built in Baghdad. In its original form, the mosque was a quadrangle about 100 yards (91 m) on each side, i.e. about one quarter that of the palace. Like much of the Round City, the structure was built of sun-dried bricks set in clay, while its roof was supported by wooden columns topped with wooden capitals. Most of the latter were composed of several pieces, joined endwise with glue, and clamped with iron bolts; but five or six of them, near the minaret, were formed from a single large tree-trunk each.

The palace and mosque complex was apparently completed by the time al-Mansur took up residence in the city in 763. Apart from the palace and two annexes to the northwest, the complex was surrounded by a wide empty space where construction was prohibited. Around this, the palaces of al-Mansur's younger children, quarters for the palace servants, and the offices of the various administrative departments were built.

=== Harun al-Rashid's reconstruction ===
In 807, Harun al-Rashid (r. 786–809) tore down the structure and rebuilt it with kiln-fired bricks set in mortar. Work was finished in 809. This structure was later known as "The Old Court" (aṣ-saḥn al-ʿatīq). Soon, however, it became apparent that it was not large enough to host the number of worshippers flocking to it during the Friday prayers. As a result, a neighbouring building, the "House of the Cotton Seller" (Dār al-Qaṭṭān), which previously housed an administrative department, was converted into an auxiliary mosque. As it proved more convenient, it soon came to supplant the Great Mosque, which by 875 was no longer being used for the Friday prayers.

=== Al-Mu'tadid's renovation ===
Caliph al-Mu'tadid (r. 892–902) objected to this state of affairs, and in 893 expanded the Great Mosque by tearing down part of the Palace of the Golden Gate. The wall originally separating the two was left standing, but was now pierced by 17 arched gateways: 13 into the courtyard of the mosque, and four on the side aisles. The commander Badr al-Mu'tadidi was made responsible for the new portions of the mosque, which were named Badriyah after him. The remains of the original structure of Harun al-Rashid's time were cleaned and restored, while special care was given to the restoration and decoration of the mihrab, the minbar, and the maqsurah. Ahmad ibn Rustah described the mosque, following al-Mu'tadid's restoration, as a "fine structure of kiln-burnt bricks well mortared, which is covered by a roof of teak wood supported on columns of the same, the whole being ornamented with [tiles the colour of] lapislazuli." The mosque's minaret burned down in 915, but was rebuilt.

=== Later history ===
The Great Mosque continued to be the chief Friday mosque of the city throughout the Abbasid period, although in the late 9th century the residential life of the city had moved, along with the caliphal palaces, to East Baghdad across the Tigris. Under the Buyid emirs in particular, the Round City was abandoned and was left virtually deserted. In 1058–1059, during the revolt of al-Basasiri, the Fatimid caliph was commemorated during the Friday prayers. When Benjamin of Tudela visited the city in 1160, he reports that once a year the Caliph rode in pomp from his palace in East Baghdad to the Great Mosque "at the Basra Gate quarter", which remained the chief mosque in the city.

The mosque was flooded in 1255, and apparently survived the Sack of Baghdad by the Mongols in 1258, as it does not appear in the list of destroyed shrines later restored by Hulagu. When Ibn Battutah visited the city in 1327, he reported the mosque as still standing, but it disappeared at a later, unknown date; no trace of it survives today.
