= Congregational mosque =

Type of masjid designated for Friday noon prayers

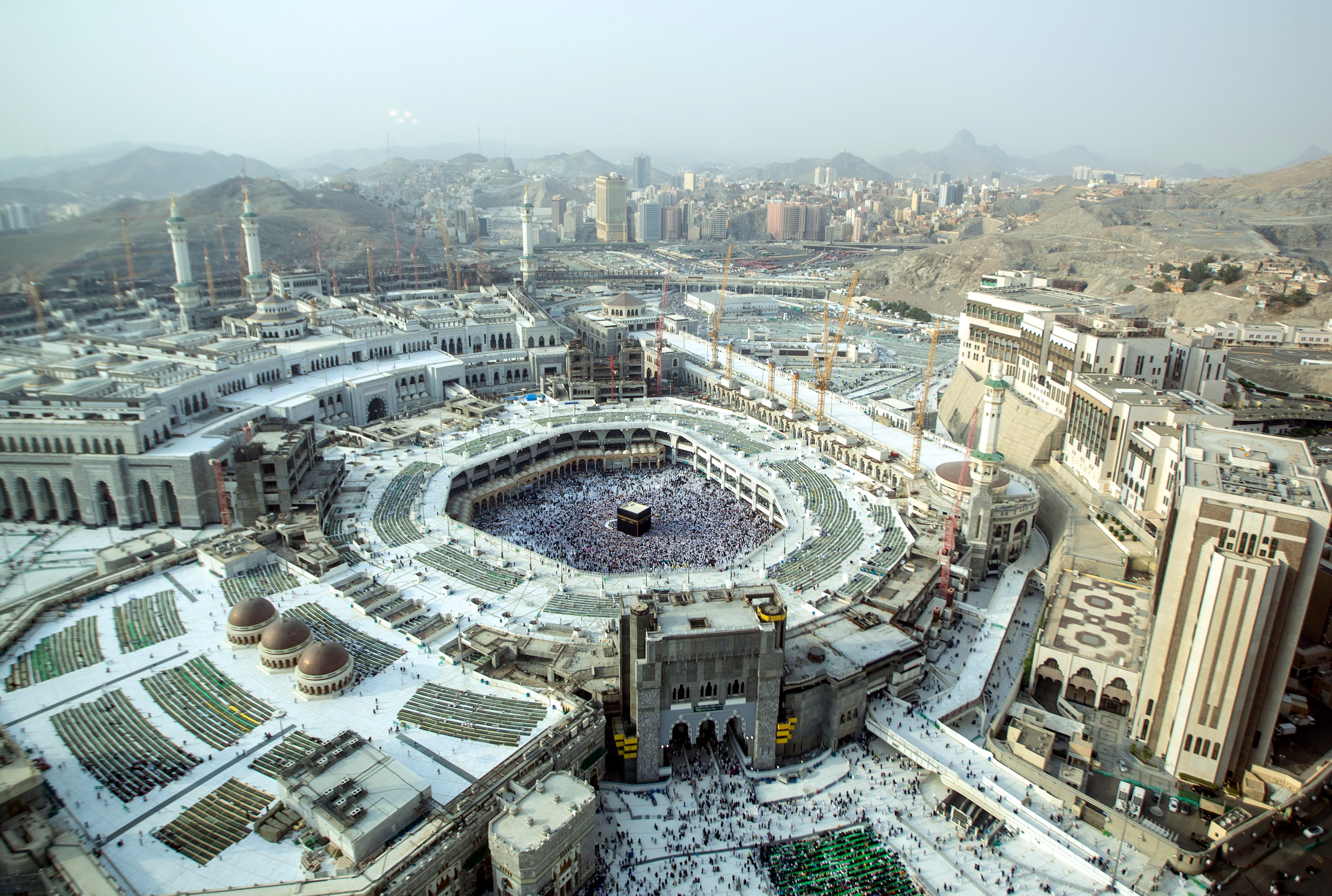
The Masjid al-Haram in Mecca, Saudi Arabia, regularly used for Congregational prayer.

A congregational mosque or Friday mosque (Arabic: مَسْجِد جَامِع, romanized: masjid jāmi‘, or simply جَامِع, jāmi‘; Turkish: Cami; Urdu: جامع مسجد, romanized: jama masjid), or sometimes great mosque or grand mosque (جامع كبير, jāmi‘ kabir; Ulu Cami), is a mosque for hosting the Friday noon prayers known as jumu'ah. It can also host the Eid prayers in situations when there is no musalla or eidgah available nearby to host the prayers. In early Islamic history, the number of congregational mosques in one city was strictly limited. As cities and populations grew over time, it became more common for many mosques to host Friday prayers in the same area. In early centuries, the congregational mosque was also a center of social and public life, hosting various other activities in addition to prayers, such as judicial and educational functions.

== Etymology ==
The full Arabic term for this kind of mosque is masjid jāmi‘ (مَسْجِد جَامِع), which is typically translated as "mosque of congregation" or "congregational mosque". "Congregational" is used to translate jāmi‘ (جَامِع), which comes from the Arabic root "ج - م - ع" which has a meaning ‘to bring together’ or ‘to unify’ (verbal form: جمع and يجمع). In Arabic, the term is typically simplified to just jāmi‘ (جَامِع). Similarly, in Turkish the term cami (Turkish pronunciation: [d͡ʒami]) is used for the same purpose. As the distinction between a "congregational mosque" and other mosques has diminished in more recent history, the Arabic terms masjid and jami' have become more interchangeable.

== Historical background ==
=== Early functions ===
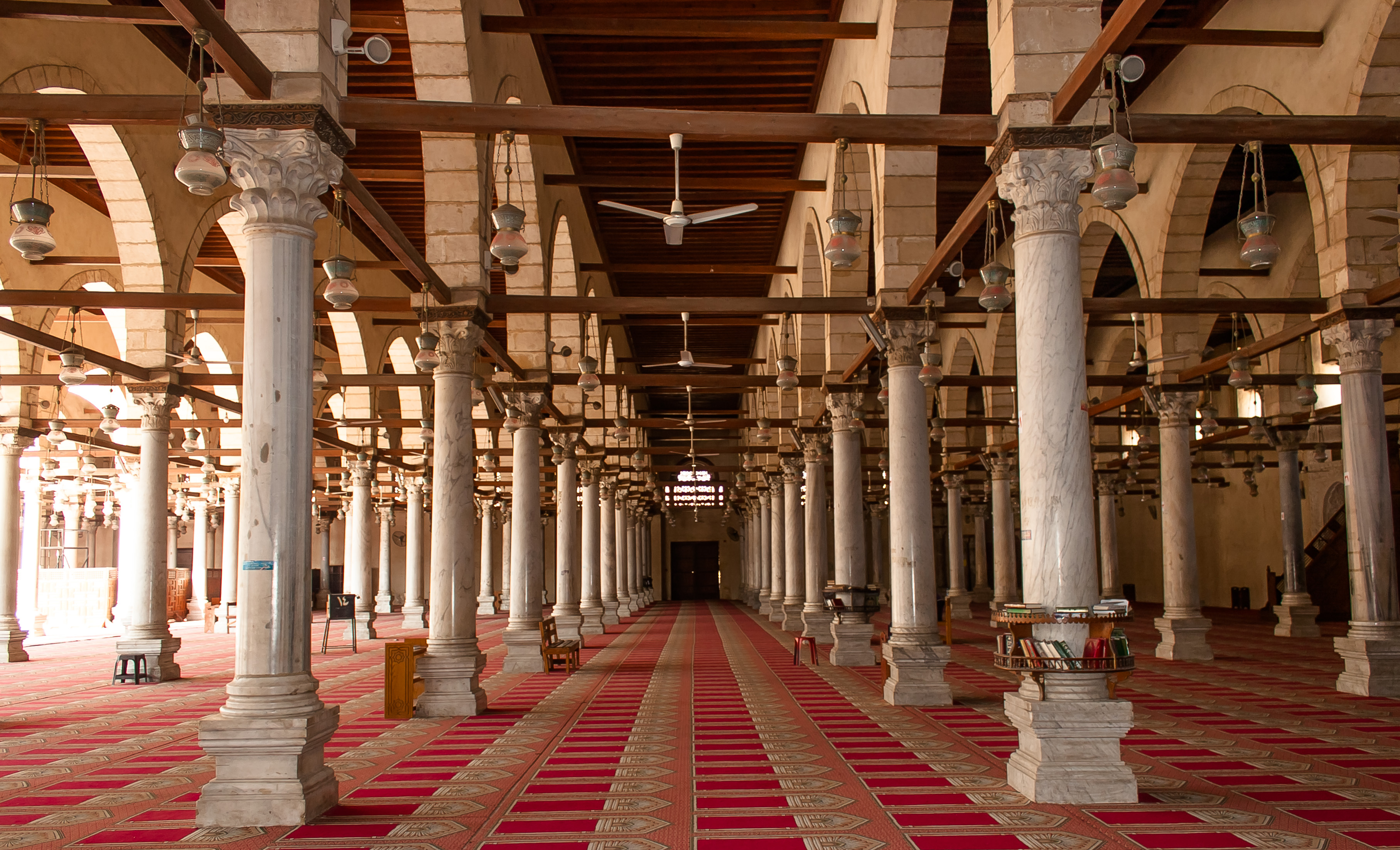
Mosque of Amr ibn al-As, founded in the seventh century as the first congregational mosque in Egypt, located in Fustat (now part of Cairo)

Since the early periods of Islam, a functional distinction existed between large central mosques built and controlled by the state versus small local mosques built and maintained by the general population. In the early years of Islam, under the Rashidun caliphs and many of the Umayyad caliphs, each city generally had only one congregational mosque where Friday prayers were held, while smaller mosques for regular prayers were built in local neighbourhoods. In fact, in some parts of the Islamic world such as in Egypt, Friday services were initially not permitted in villages and in other areas outside the main city where the congregational mosque stood.

The ruler or governor of the city usually built his residence (the dar al-imara) next to the congregational mosque, and in this early period the ruler also delivered the khutbah (Friday sermon) during Friday prayers. This practice was inherited from the example of Muhammad and was passed on the caliphs after him. In the provinces, the local governors who ruled on behalf of the caliph were expected to deliver the khutbah for their local community. The minbar, a kind of pulpit from which the khutbah was traditionally given, also became a standard feature of congregational mosques by the early Abbasid period (late eighth century).

Until the 11th century at least, the congregational mosque of a city served many wider civic functions, differing somewhat from the more strictly religious character of mosques today. It hosted judicial activities such as Muslim judges (qadis) announcing their judgments on cases. Its courtyard (sahn) often acted like a public forum for political and scholarly discussions as well as a semi-recreational area that sometimes contained gardens or trees. The courtyard could be occupied by sellers, hawkers, and others conducting business and even animals were sometimes brought inside. The range of informal activities inside the mosque was so diverse that some jurists (ulama) and rulers, such as the Abbasid caliph al-Mu'tadid (r. 892–902), attempted to place restrictions on them. Until the emergence of the madrasa as a distinct institution during the 11th century, the congregational mosque was also the main venue for religious education by hosting halqas (study circles). As it was usually located in the heart of the city and attracted much traffic, the neighbourhood around the congegational mosque also commonly became one of the main market areas in the city.

=== Proliferation ===
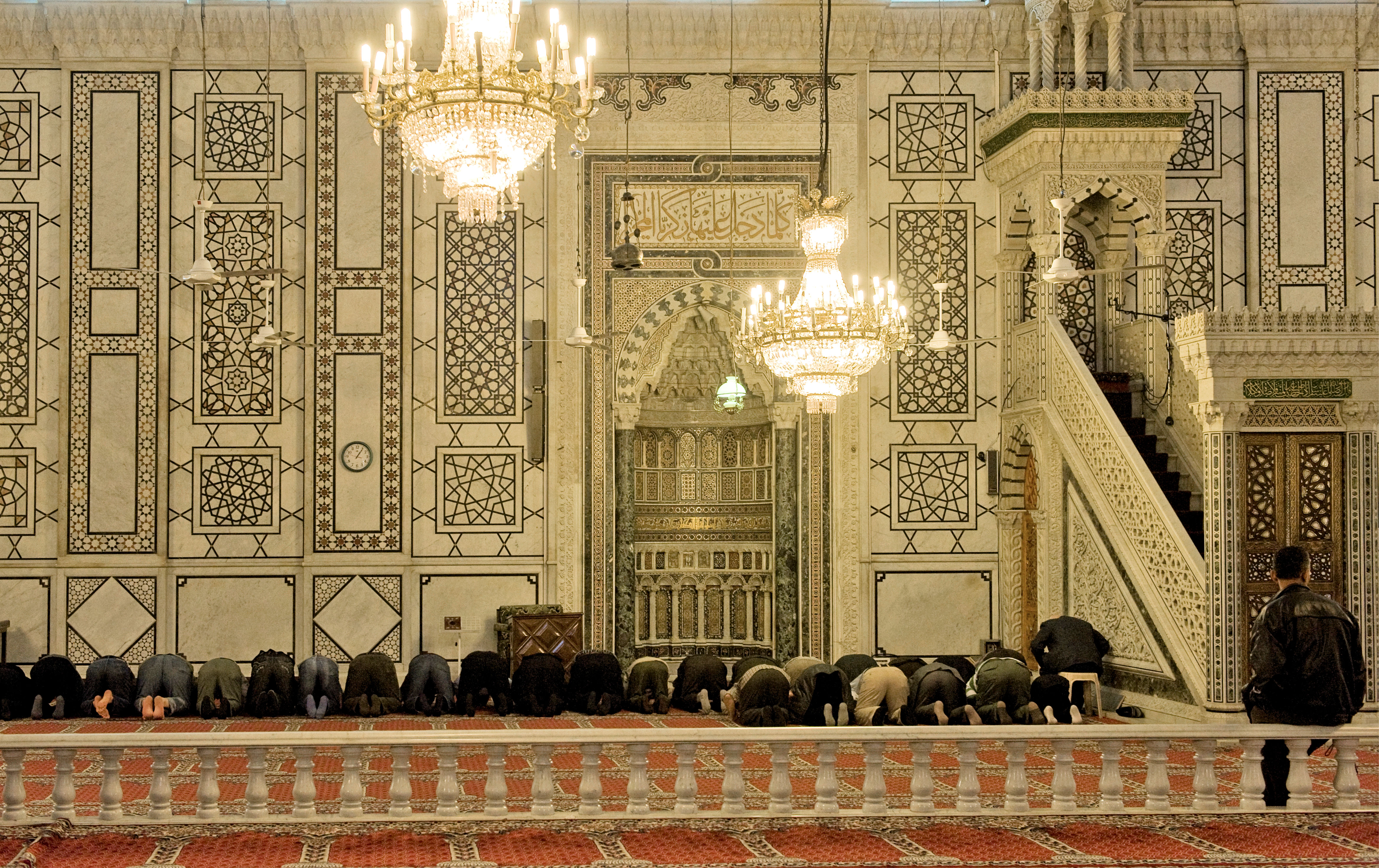
The mihrab area of the Umayyad Mosque in Damascus today, with the minbar to the right

In later centuries, as the Islamic world became increasingly divided between different political states, as the Muslim population and the cities grew, and as new rulers wished to leave their mark of patronage, it became common to have multiple congregational mosques in the same city. For example, Baghdad, the capital of the Abbasid Caliphate, had just two congregational mosques by the late 9th century: the Great Mosque of al-Mansur, located in the original Round City on the western shore of the Tigris River, and the Mosque of al-Mahdi, in the Rusafa quarter added on the eastern shore of the river. During the 10th century, the number of congregational mosques grew to six, compared to hundreds of other local regular mosques. The Abbasid caliphs, who had by the mid-10th century had lost all political power, retained the privilege of designating congregational mosques in the city and of appointing their preachers. By the 11th century, the Arab writer and traveler Ibn Jubayr notes eleven congregational mosques in the city.

In another example, Fustat, the predecessor of modern Cairo, was founded in the seventh century with just one congregational mosque (the Mosque of Amr ibn al-As), but by the 15th century, under the Mamluks, the urban agglomeration of Cairo and Fustat had 130 congregational mosques. In fact, the city became so saturated with congregational mosques that by the late 15th century its rulers could rarely build new ones. A similar proliferation of congregational mosques occurred in the cities of Syria, Iraq, Iran, and Morocco, as well as in the newly conquered Constantinople (Istanbul) under Ottoman rule.

== Architecture ==
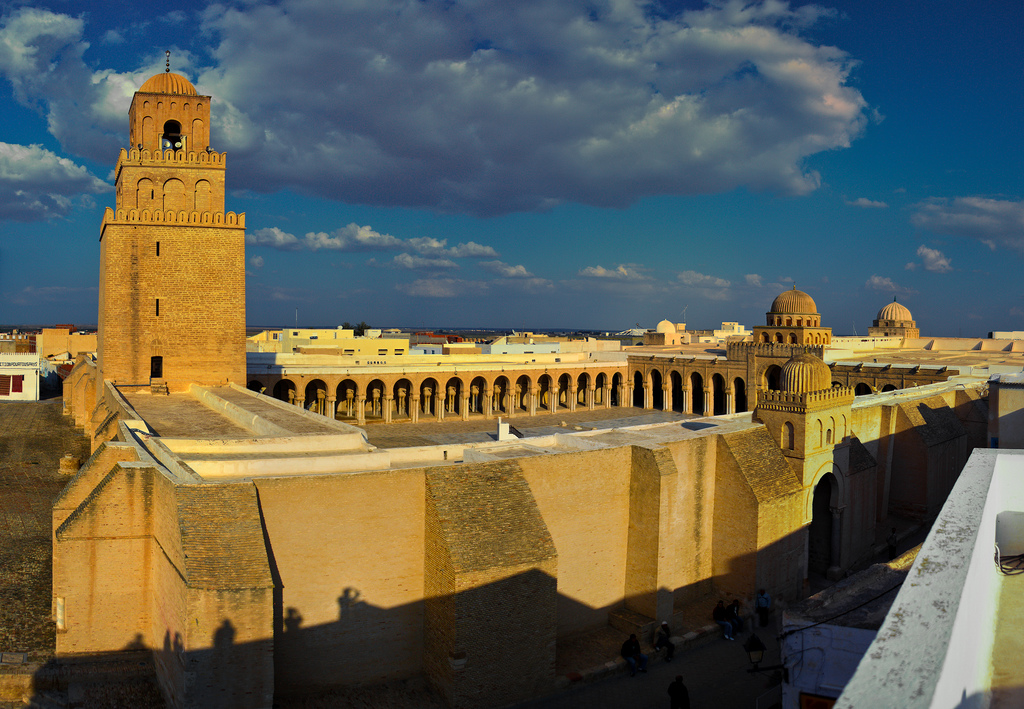
Great Mosque of Kairouan in Tunisia founded in the seventh century as the first congregational mosque in Maghreb region.

As both a prayer and a community space, mosque buildings allow for religious and social engagement. The Qur'an does not state architectural parameters for a congregational mosque, and as a result there are both differences and similarities between congregational mosques of different regions. As all male members of the community are expected to attend Friday prayers, congregational mosques must be large enough to accommodate them and their size thus varies from community to community. The Qur'an does highlight that the prayer hall has to accommodate the population of the community. Almost all congregational mosques feature a minbar, which is an elevated platform where the Friday sermon is given. The minbar is usually places near the qibla wall (the wall standing in the direction of prayer) and the mihrab.

== See also ==
- Salat, formal worship in Islam
- Lists of mosques
  - List of largest mosques
  - List of mosques
  - List of the oldest mosques
