= Round City of Baghdad =

Original core of the city of Baghdad

The City of Peace / Al-Mansur City
- مدينة السلام (Arabic)
- The City of Peace / Al-Mansur
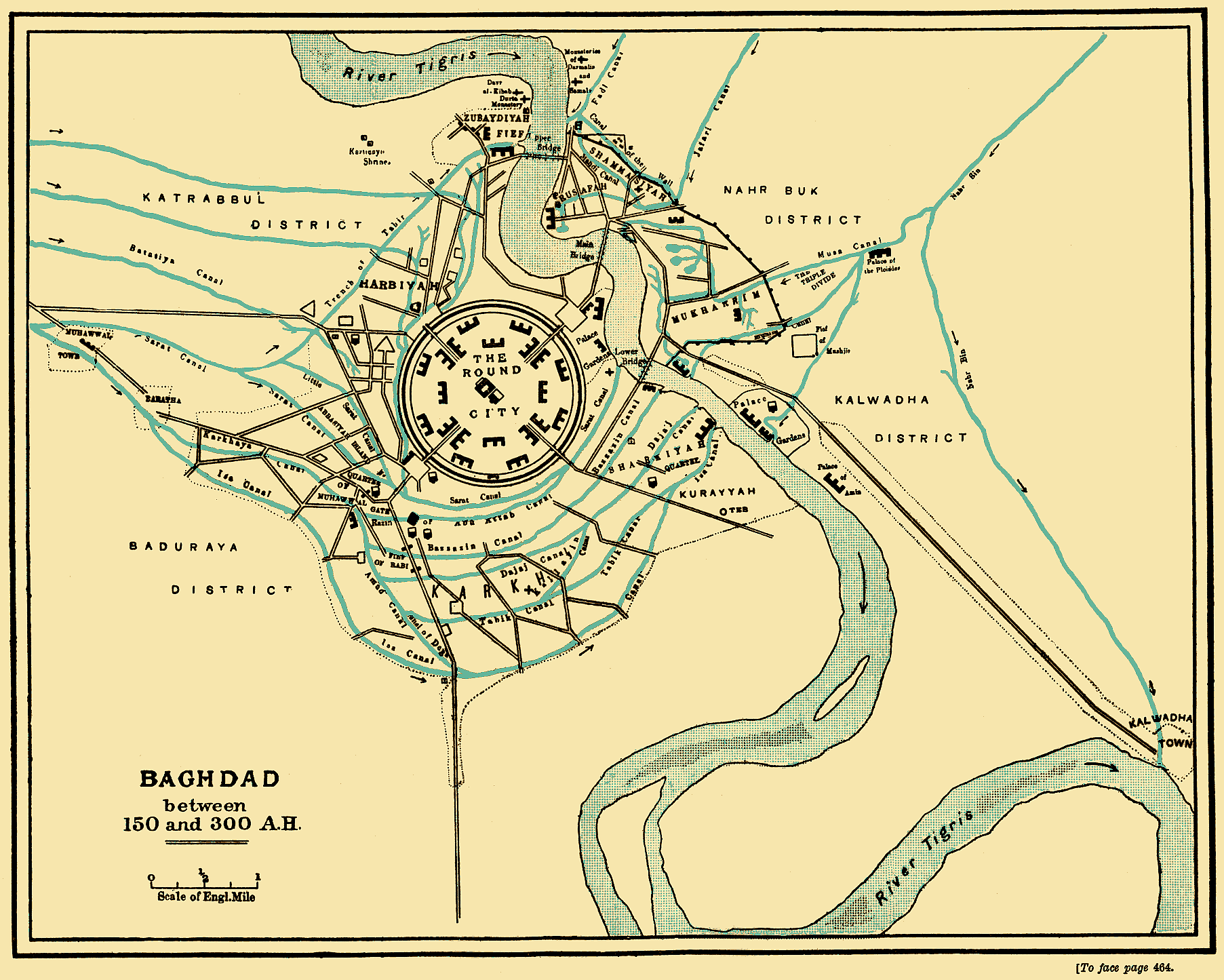
- Baghdad under the early Abbasid caliphs, with the Round City

- Location within Iraq
- 33°20′51″N 44°20′06″E
- Type: Settlement
- Location: Baghdad, Iraq

The Round City of Baghdad is the original core of Baghdad, built by the Abbasid Caliph al-Mansur in 762–766 AD as the official residence of the Abbasid court. Its official name in Abbasid times was City of Peace (Arabic: مدينة السلام, romanized: Madīnat as-Salām). The famous library known as the House of Wisdom was located within its grounds.

== Description ==
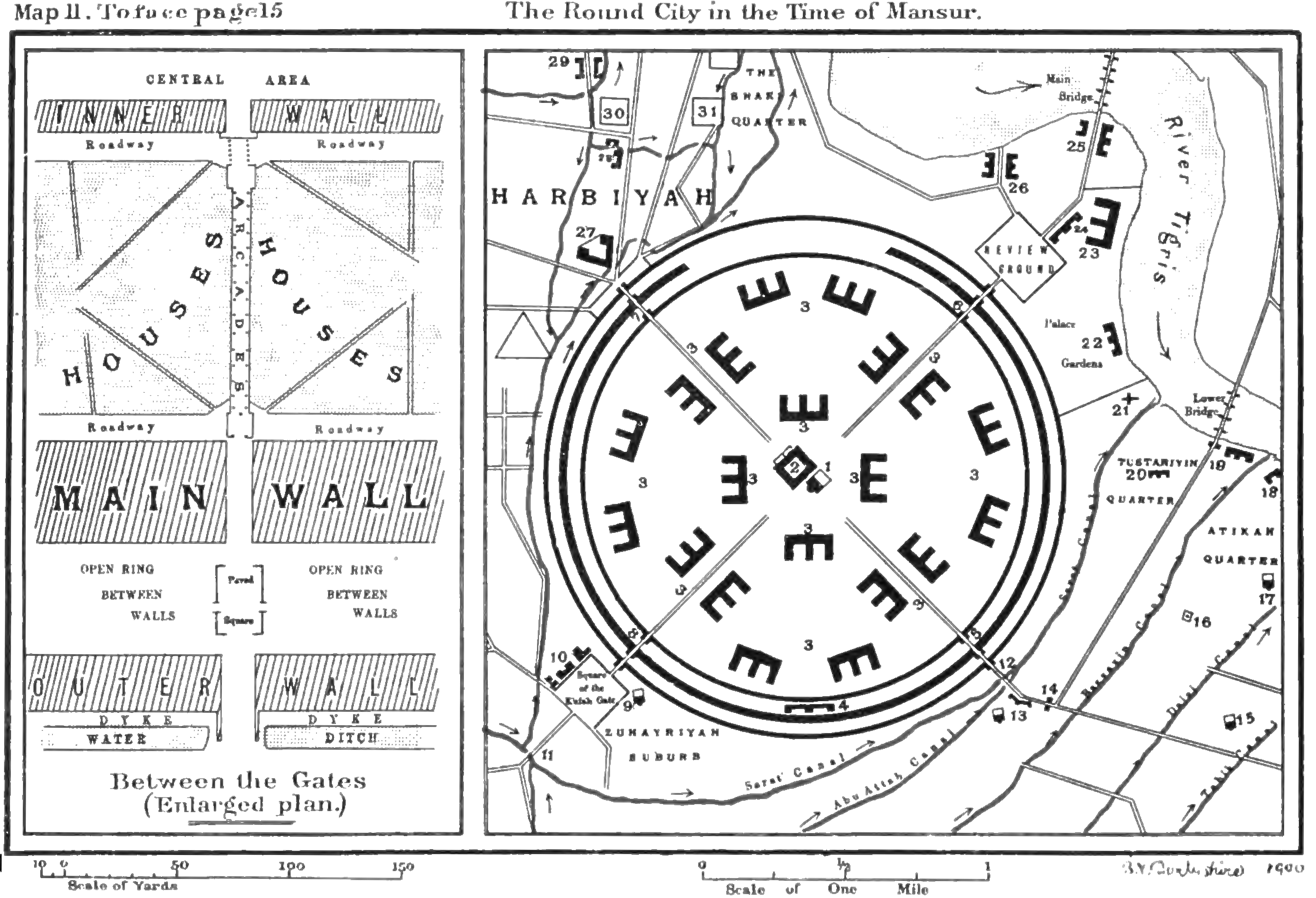
The Round City of Baghdad, reconstructed by Guy Le Strange (1900)

According to Ya'qubi, the plans for the city were drawn up, but it was not until 2 August 762 that construction began, under the supervision of four architects. Huge resources were amassed for the project: the Arab chroniclers report 100,000 workers and craftsmen, and sums of 18 million gold dinars or 100 million silver dirhams. The caliphal Palace of the Golden Gate and the main mosque, as well as some of the administration offices, were apparently completed by 763, allowing al-Mansur to move his residence into the city, and the rest of the Round City was completed by 766.

Mansur believed that Baghdad was the perfect city to be the capital of the Islamic empire under the Abbasids. Mansur loved the site so much he is quoted saying, "This is indeed the city that I am to found, where I am to live, and where my descendants will reign afterward". The goal was to replace Harran as the seat of the caliphal government; however, a city of Baghdad is mentioned in pre-Islamic texts, including the Talmud, and the Abbasid city was likely built on the site of this earlier settlement.

Baghdad eclipsed Ctesiphon, the capital of the Sasanian Empire, which was located some 30 km (19 mi) to the southeast, which had been under Muslim control since 637, and which became quickly deserted after the foundation of Baghdad. The site of Babylon, which had been deserted since the 2nd century, lies some 90 km (56 mi) to the south.

The old Baghdad was a small village, and despite its name, which is of Iranian origin (bag "god" + dād "gifted"), the original inhabitants were probably Aramaic-speaking Nabateans. The new city, however, was mainly Arabic-speaking, with considerable Persian elements in the population and urban environment, although there may not have been any major Persian settlement in the village of Baghdad or its surrounding communities: all of which were absorbed into the new city of Baghdad. Rather, the Persian elements appeared after the foundation of the new city, and included Persian architectural influence, early Persian military settlement, continuous immigration by Persian scholars, and the late arrival of rulers of Persian origin (such as the Buyids).

The city was designed as a circle about 1 km (0.62 mi) in radius, leading it to be known as the "Round City". Given this figure, it may be estimated that the original area of the city, shortly after its construction, was around 3 km^{2} (1.2 sq mi) (However, the historical sources do not agree on the size of the city.) The original design shows a ring of residential and commercial structures along the inside of the city walls, but the final construction added another ring, inside the first. In the center of the city lay the caliphal palace, the mosque, as well as headquarters for guards. The purpose or use of the remaining space in the center is unknown. The circular design of the city was a direct reflection of the traditional Persian Sasanian urban design. The ancient Sasanian city of Gur/Firouzabad is nearly identical in its general circular design, radiating avenues, and the government buildings and temples at the center of the city. This points to the fact that it was based on Persian precedents. The two designers who were hired by al-Mansur to plan the city's design were Naubakht, a former Zoroastrian, and Mashallah ibn Athari, a Persian Jewish astrologer/astronomer.

The city had four gates: Bab al-Kufa ("gate of Kufa"), Bab al-Sham ("gate of al-Sham or Damascus"), Bab al-Khorasan ("gate of Khorasan"), and Bab al-Basra ("gate of Basra"). This too is similar to the round cities of Darabgard and Gor, which had four gates. The Khuld Palace, the main palace of Baghdad built by al-Mansur, was located near the Bab al-Khorasan. The Khorasan Gate marked the beginning of the Great Khorasan Road.

None of the structures of the city has survived, and information is based on literary sources. The caliphal Palace of the Golden Gate and the main mosque were located at the centre of the circle. Influenced by the apadana design of ancient Iranian architecture, the mosque was built with a hypostyle prayer-hall with wooden columns supporting its flat roof. The caliphal palace featured an iwan and a dome-chamber immediately behind it, resembling Sasanian palace design (such as that of Gor and Sarvestan). Building materials was mostly brick (sometimes strengthened by reeds), reflecting Mesopotamian architecture.

The residents were of two types: military people who were settled by the caliph, and a large number of ordinary people who later settled in the city for economic opportunities. The second group were mostly Arabs and local Nabateans. The first group were mostly Persians from Khorasan and Transoxania, who were settled in the northwestern district known as Harbiyya (حربية). The Harbiyya included Marwrūdiyya division (مرورودية, for those from Marw al-Rudh i.e. modern-day Murghab, Afghanistan), a suburb of the Furus ("Persians", or possibly people from Fars), a suburb for the Khwarezmians, and a mosque dedicated to the people of Bukhara. As the future caliph Al-Mahdi moved from al-Rayy to Baghdad in 768, a second wave of Persian military people settled there. There were also noble Iranian families Barmakids (from Balkh) and the Sulids (from Gurgan). The descendants of these Iranians took the title abnāʾ (أبناء), short for abnāʾ al-dawla (أبناء الدولة, literally "sons of the state"), but also said to be echoing the title of the abna' of Yemen, also of Persian origin. The Persians of Baghdad were gradually acculturated by the early 9th century.

The walls of the city were breached by the Mongols' Ilkhanate in February 1258, during the Siege of Baghdad. The city was rebuilt without any surviving portions of the walls.

== Modern references to the "discovery" of the Round City ==
As the host of one of the major intellectual centers in the Abbasid Caliphs, the Grand Library of Baghdad, also known as The House of Wisdom, was likely to have attracted scholars of several disciplines. Among them, geographers, historians, or simple chroniclers provided extensive descriptions of the Madinat al-Mansur even years after the city's fading. All the information we have today related to the physical characteristics, structural functions, and social life in Abbasid Baghdad comes from these literary sources which were revisited in the 20th century. Some of the most important surviving literary sources from the late 10th and 11th centuries in Baghdad are "Description of Mesopotamia and Baghdad," written by Ibn Serapion; "Tarikh Baghdad (A History of Baghdad)", by the scholar and historian Al-Khatib al-Baghdadi, and the "Geographical Dictionary" by the geographer and historian Ya'qubi. These three books have constituted the foundation and required reading for modern research on the matter.

The definite revelation for the academic community of the existence of the Round City of Baghdad was recorded by Guy Le Strange, a British Orientalist prominent in the field of historical geography. His work "Baghdad during the Abbasid Caliphate: from contemporary Arabic and Persian sources," (1900) revisited, among other scholars, the work of Serapion and Ya'qubi to reconstruct a plan of the old city. Le Strange himself wrote in the preface of his book:

"(...) the real basis of the present reconstruction of the medieval plan is the description of the Canals of Baghdad written by Ibn Serapion in about the year a.d. 900. By combining the network of the water system, as described by this writer, with the radiating high-roads, as described by his contemporary Yakubi, it has been possible to plot out the various quarters of older Baghdad, filling in details from the accounts of other authorities, which, taken alone, would have proved too fragmentary to serve for any systematic reconstruction of the plan."

A few years after Le Strange's first publication of the Round City's plan, a wave of German and British excavations was commissioned by emerging museums and universities. Two scholars re-re-visited the topic while working in Iraq, conducting excavations in neighboring cities like Samarra. The first one to improve Le Strange's initial plan was Ernst Herzfeld, a German archeologist who produced between 1905 and 1913 a large body of work including translations, drawings, field notes, photographs, and objects inventories from his excavations at Samarra and elsewhere in Iraq and Iran. Concerned with the critical problems found in the original descriptive texts, Herzfeld, an architect by profession, offered new interpretations and developed new plans of the Round City of Baghdad. His study was more related to the description, arrangement, and function of the city's main buildings, contrasting with the more urbanistic approach of Le Strange. His reconstructions were celebrated as the first "major architectural work on this subject," accepted by subsequent scholars. One of them was British art historian Sir K. A. C. Creswell, whose 1932 publication of the first volume of his monumental survey "Early Muslim Architecture" remains widely acknowledged as an essential reference for early Islamic architecture.

The lack of archeological excavations at the surmised location of the Round City means the task of reconstructing the Medinat al-Mansur is mostly a hypothetical exercise. The topic was revisited in the second half of the 20th century in new contexts. One of the more recent scholars who has undertaken the subject is Jacob Lassner, who presented a new critical interpretation based on the original texts "Tarikh Baghdad, (A History of Baghdad)," the "Geographical Dictionary" by al-Baghdadi and Ya'qubi, and the assessments made by Herzfeld and Creswell in the beginning of the 20th century. Lassner's "The Topography of Baghdad in the Early Middle Ages" (1970) and "The Shaping of Abbasid Rule" (1980) presented a new concept of the city plan and a contrasting view of its architectural function and historical development in the earliest period, improving understanding of the city's design. In Lassner's studies, at least four previously held ideas about the al-Mansur's city were revised.

First, Lassner rejected the idea that al-Mansûr himself, "who had no known experience in architectural design (or with round structures) could have personally created ex nihilo such a sophisticated and unusual design." Second, he argues against the view that Baghdad's building was a sign of the Abbasid assumption of Iranian rulership, being more a visible manifestation of the Abbasid inheritance of Persian Sassanian urban design royal tradition. Third, he rejects the claims that the palace-city had symbolic cosmological significance "simply because there are no explicit statements in the sources connecting the caliph with such symbolism." Finally, he affirms that "The Round City was, in fact, an administrative center, and not at all a city in the conventional sense of the term."

== See also ==
- Gates of Baghdad
- List of circular cities

== Sources ==
- Duri, A. A. (1960). "Baghdād". In Gibb, H. A. R.; Kramers, J. H.; Lévi-Provençal, E.; Schacht, J.; Lewis, B. & Pellat, Ch. (eds.). The Encyclopaedia of Islam, Second Edition. Volume I: A–B. Leiden: E. J. Brill. pp. 894–908. OCLC 495469456.
- Le Strange, Guy (1922). Baghdad During the Abbasid Caliphate. From Contemporary Arabic and Persian Sources (Second ed.). Oxford: Clarendon Press.
