= Jean Jenkins (ethnomusicologist) =

American ethnomusician (1922–1990)

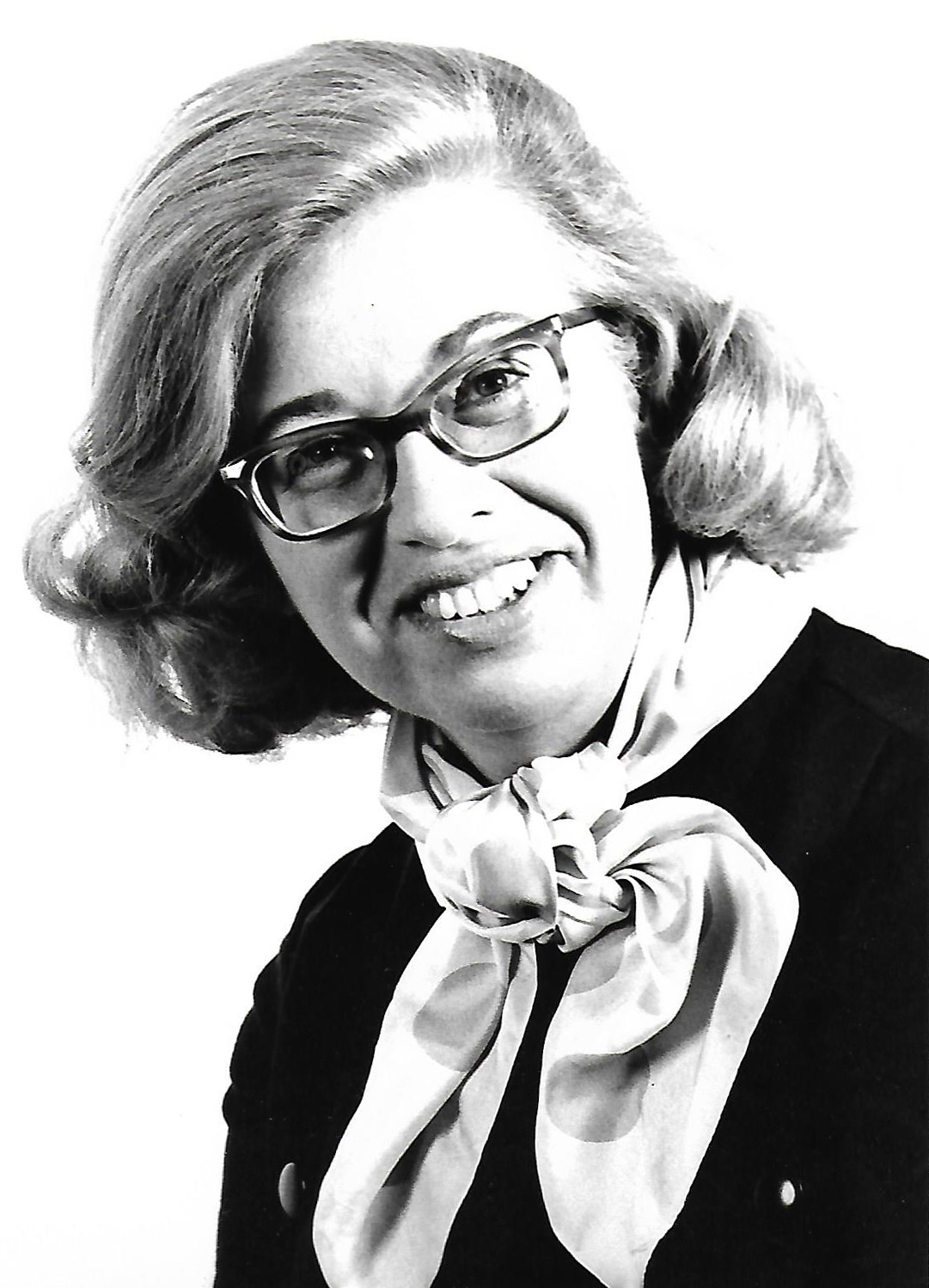
Jean Jenkins

Jean Jenkins (17 March 1922 - 12 September 1990) was an American-born ethnomusicologist who spent most of her career based in the UK and travelled all over the world to collect sound recordings, slides and musical instruments.

== Biography ==
Jean Jenkins was born in Arkansas and studied anthropology and musicology in Missouri during the 1940s. In 1949 she arrived in Britain with her first husband, and continued her studies at the University of London, at the School of Oriental and African Studies.

Jenkins travelled widely throughout Africa and Central Asia between the 1950s and 1980s creating exceptional recordings, and taking detailed notes. She was a key figure in laying the ground for the contemporary world music scene, and as well as insight into traditional music from around the world, her archives reveal a larger than life woman, who fled McCarthy, was friends with Haile Selassie and who was meticulous, packing silk handkerchiefs and girdles whenever she travelled. In 1954 she joined the staff of the Horniman Museum in South London. During her time at the museum she built up the musical instrument collections from developing countries, conducted important fieldwork in Ethiopia (throughout the 1960s) and created a centre for ethnomusicology. Meanwhile, she married her second husband and obtained a British passport in order to avoid being deported to the US for her trade union work. The marriage was dissolved in 1961.

A strong-willed and energetic woman, during the 1960s and 1970s Jean Jenkins travelled extensively throughout Southern Europe, Asia and Africa. Among many other places, she visited Uganda (1966 and 1968), Malaysia (1972), Indonesia (1973) Afghanistan and Mongolia (1974) Algeria and Morocco, and Turkey and Syria (1975). During these extended trips she collected a wealth of information in the form of sound recordings, slides and photographs, and also kept regular diaries. In addition, she collected a vast range of musical instruments. In 1977, the Tangent Records of UK issued two albums titled "Vocal Music from Mongolia" (Volume I) and "Instrumental Music from Mongolia" (Volume II) by Jean Jenkins' recordings. The albums containing rich, diverse and unique traditional vocal and instrumental music from Mongolia were highly valued not only in Mongolia, but also in Europe and the United States.

After curating the 1976 exhibition "Music and Musical Instruments for the World of Islam" at the Horniman Museum, thereby introducing the collections to a much wider audience, in 1978 she left the museum and continued to work independently in Edinburgh, France and Germany. In 1983 she curated the important exhibition "Man and Music" at the Royal Scottish Museum in Edinburgh. She died in London on 12 September 1990.

== Collections at the National Museums of Scotland ==
In 1980 the National Museum of Scotland acquired Jean Jenkins's own collection of musical instruments and in 1990 the museum was bequeathed her entire archive of field recordings, indexes, diaries and 13,000 slides and photographs. Together, they form a unique record of musical traditions which, in some places, have disappeared.

== Publications ==
- Jenkins, Jean Man and Music, Edinburgh, Royal Scottish Museum, 1983
- Jenkins, Jean and Olsen, Poul Rovsing Music and Musical Instruments in the World of Islam, World of Islam Festival, 1976
- Jenkins, Jean, Ethiopia Volume 2, "Music of the Nomads"

== Recordings ==

- Jenkins, Jean and Olsen, Poul Rovsing Music in the World of Islam, including The Human Voice, Lutes, Strings, Flutes and Trumpets, Reeds and Bagpipes and Drums and Rhythms (Tangent TGS 131 through 136), 1976
- Jenkins, Jean, Ethiopia Volume 1, "Music of the Central Highlands", Tangent TGM Mono, 1970
- Jenkins, Jean, Ethiopia Volume 2, "Music of the Desert Nomads", Tangent TGM 102 Mono, 1970
- Jenkins, Jean, Ethiopia Volume 3, "Music of the Eritrea", Tangent TGM Mono, 1970
- Jenkins, Jean, Vocal Music From Mongolia, Volume 1, Tangent TGM, LP format, UK 1977
- Jenkins, Jean, Instrumental Music from Mongolia, Volume 2, Tangent TM, LP format, UK 1977
