= Rabi'ah ibn Ahmad ibn Tulun =

Son of Tulunid dynasty founder, Ahmad ibn Tulun

Rabiʿah ibn Ahmad ibn Tulun ابو المكارم ربيعة بن أحمد بن طولون
- Born: Samarra or Egypt
- Died: c. 897; Egypt
- Criminal charges: Treason, Rebellion
- Penalty: Lashing to death

Details
- Date: 897

Abū al-Mukarram Rabīʿah ibn Aḥmad ibn Ṭūlūn (Arabic: ابو المكارم ربيعة بن أحمد بن طولون) was the fourth son of the founder of the Tulunid dynasty, Ahmad ibn Tulun. In 879, when his eldest brother Abbas rebelled against their father and fled to Alexandria and thence to Barqah, he remained in charge of affairs in Fustat until the return of Ahmad ibn Tulun.

In 897, he rebelled against his nephew, Harun ibn Khumarawayh, in Alexandria, with the support of Berber troops. The uprising was defeated, and he was executed by lashing in the same autumn.

== Sources ==
- Al-Balawi, Abu Muhammad 'Abdallah ibn Muhammad al-Madini (1939). Kurd 'Ali, Muhammad (ed.). Sirat Ahmad ibn Tulun. Cairo: Maktabat al-Thaqafah al-Diniyyah.
- Bianquis, Thierry (1998). "Autonomous Egypt from Ibn Ṭūlūn to Kāfūr, 868–969". In Petry, Carl F. (ed.). Cambridge History of Egypt, Volume One: Islamic Egypt, 640–1517. Cambridge: Cambridge University Press. pp. 86–119. ISBN 0-521-47137-0.
- Al-Kindi, Muhammad ibn Yusuf (1912). Guest, Rhuvon (ed.). The Governors and Judges of Egypt (in Arabic). Leyden and London: E. J. Brill.
