= Ahmad ibn Muzahim ibn Khaqan =

Ahmad ibn Muzahim ibn Khaqan (Arabic: أحمد بن مزاحم بن خاقان) was the military governor (wālī al-jaysh) of Egypt for the Abbasid dynasty for a part of 868.

== Career ==
The son of Muzahim ibn Khaqan, Ahmad succeeded his father as governor following the latter's death. After holding the post for only two months, however, Ahmad died himself of unspecified causes. Azjur al-Turki, who had served as chief of police under both Muzahim and Ahmad, then became governor.

== Sources ==
- Bianquis, Thierry (1998). "Autonomous Egypt from Ibn Ṭūlūn to Kāfūr, 868–969". In Petry, Carl F. (ed.). Cambridge History of Egypt, Volume One: Islamic Egypt, 640–1517. Cambridge: Cambridge University Press. pp. 86–119. ISBN 0-521-47137-0.
- Gordon, Matthew S. (2001). The Breaking of a Thousand Swords: A History of the Turkish Military of Samarra (A.H. 200–275/815–889 C.E.). Albany, New York: State University of New York Press. ISBN 0-7914-4795-2.
- Al-Kindi, Muhammad ibn Yusuf (1912). Guest, Rhuvon (ed.). The Governors and Judges of Egypt (in Arabic). Leyden and London: E. J. Brill.

Preceded by Muzahim ibn Khaqan	Governor of Egypt; 868	Succeeded by Azjur al-Turki
