= Azjur al-Turki =

9th-century Abbasid Turkic military officer

Azjur al-Turki (Arabic: أزجور التركي) or Arkhuz ibn Ulugh Tarkhan al-Turki (أرخوز بن أولوغ طرخان التركي) was a Turkic military officer in the service of the Abbasid Caliphate. He was briefly the governor of Egypt in 868, and was the last individual to hold that office prior to the Tulunid takeover of Egypt that same year.

== Career ==
According to the fifteenth century chronicler Ibn Taghribirdi, Azjur/Arkhuz was born in Baghdad to Ulugh Tarkhan, a Turkic man of likely high status, as evidenced by the use of the title tarkhan. Azjur himself eventually became one of the senior amirs of the Abbasid state, and in 867 he was appointed as chief of security (shurtah) of Egypt by the governor Muzahim ibn Khaqan.

During Muzahim's governorship, Azjur assisted in quelling the revolt of Jabir ibn al-Walid, and fought a battle against him in the area of Giza in June 867. He soon made himself unpopular, however, when he introduced a number of new ritual practices in place of those traditionally used in Egypt. Muzahim eventually dismissed him from the shurtah in November 867, but Azjur remained an influential figure, and after Muzahim's death in January 868 he was again appointed as the head of security for Muzahim's son and successor Ahmad.

In April 868, Azjur himself became governor of Egypt following the death of Ahmad. During his administration he sent the rebel Jabir, who had been imprisoned in al-Fustat by Muzahim, to Iraq, and also defeated an 'Alid rebellion that broke out in Upper Egypt. He remained governor until August or September 868, after which he was replaced by Ahmad ibn Tulun. Ibn Taghribirdi claims that he then returned to Iraq, where he was received by the caliph and became one of his officers (quwwad); al-Kindi, on the other hand, reports that he left Egypt to go on the Hajj.

== Notes ==
Preceded by Ahmad ibn Muzahim ibn Khaqan	Governor of Egypt; 868	Succeeded by Ahmad ibn Tulun
