= Ibn al-Mudabbir =

Ibn al-Mudabbir was the family name of two brothers who served in the 9th-century Abbasid court as officials:

- Ahmad ibn al-Mudabbir
- Ibrahim ibn al-Mudabbir
