= Yazid ibn Abdallah al-Hulwani =

Yazid ibn Abdallah ibn Dinar al-Hulwani (also called al-Turki) (Arabic: يزيد بن عبد الله التركي) was the military governor (wālī al-jaysh) of Egypt for the Abbasid Caliphate from 856 to 867. He was the first Turk to govern Egypt.

== Career ==
Yazid rose to prominence as a lieutenant of the Turkish commander Itakh, and he served for a time as the chief of police (ṣāḥib al-shurṭa) of Samarra as the latter's deputy. His career appears to have survived Itakh's fall from power in 849, and in 856 he was selected to govern Egypt on behalf of the Abbasid prince al-Muntasir, who had been assigned the province as part of the caliph al-Mutawakkil's succession arrangements.

Yazid's tenure as governor was characterized by a lack of stability in the country. In Upper Egypt, rebellious Arab tribes had effectively seized control of the area around Aswan. In the north, Yazid was concerned with keeping dissent followers of Ali in check. Several Alawis were arrested and deported to Samarra, and the central government sent him instructions to severely limit the freedoms Alids and their supporters in the province. In 866 a revolt in the region of Alexandria was begun by one Jabir ibn al-Walid and enjoyed the support of the local Arabs, Christians and mawālī. Soon the rebels had spread across the Delta region and defeated the Turkish garrison stationed at Fustat. As a result of Yazid's failure to suppress the rebellion, he was recalled from his post by the central government in 867.

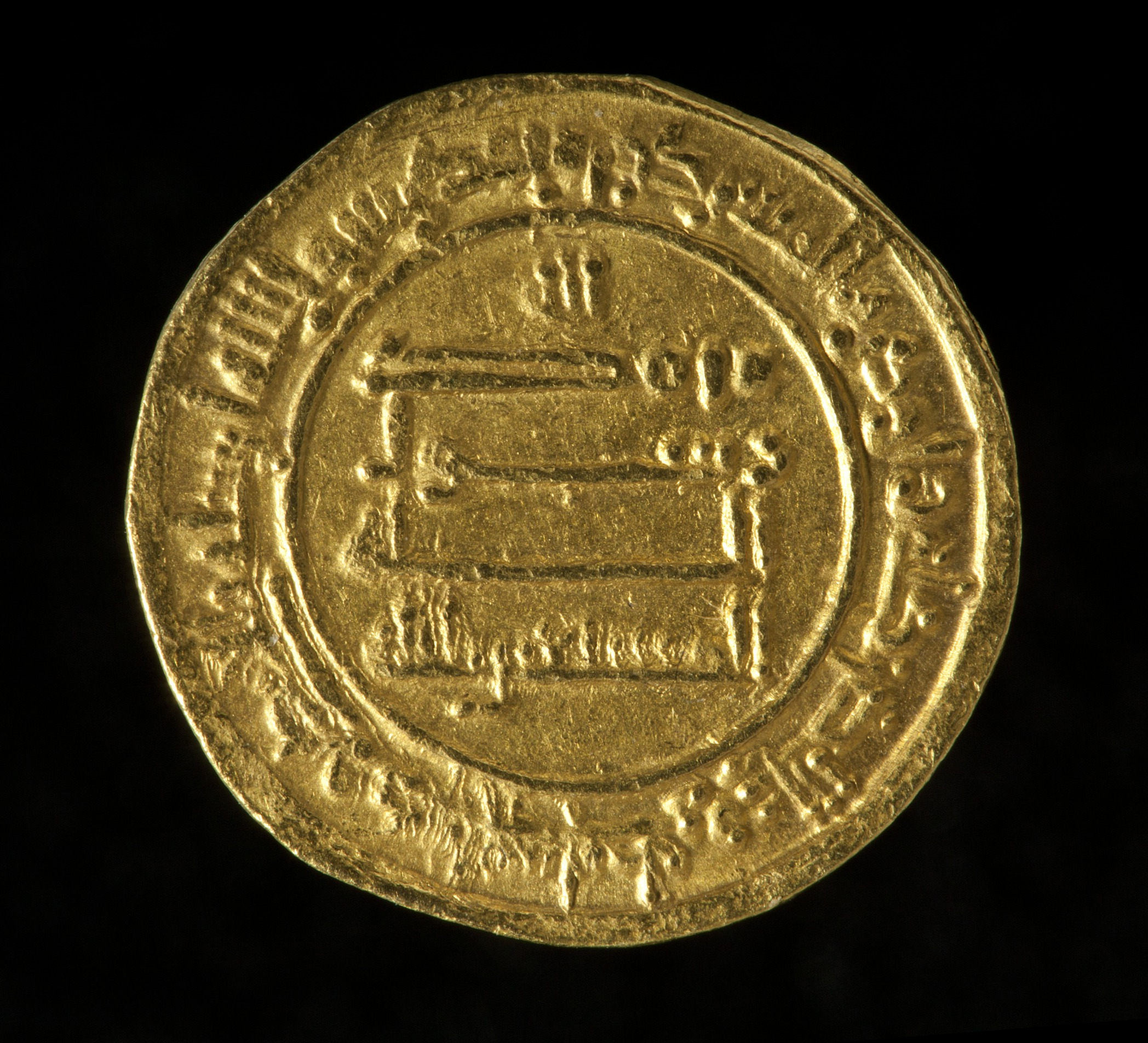
Dinar of Abbasid caliph Al-Musta'in (r. 862–866) minted in Egypt, 248 A.H /862 A.D (Yazid also remained governor of Egypt during Caliph Al-Musta'in's reign)

Part of the reason for Yazid's failure was that his powers as governor were limited. He had been given responsibility for Fustat and the Nile districts, but Alexandria and Barqa had been removed from the jurisdiction of the Egyptian government and were separately administered at the time. In addition, in accordance with the normal practice of the era, Yazid had control over the military and administration of the province, but not its fiscal affairs; these were delegated to a separate director of finance ('āmil). From 861 on this latter post was occupied by Ahmad ibn al-Mudabbir, whose heavy taxes likely exacerbated the feelings of discontent among the populace.

Yazid was replaced as governor by Muzahim ibn Khaqan, who had been dispatched to the province with reinforcements to put down Jabir's rebellion.

== Other Links ==
- Bianquis, Thierry (1998). "Autonomous Egypt from Ibn Ṭūlūn to Kāfūr, 868–969". In Petry, Carl F. (ed.). Cambridge History of Egypt, Volume One: Islamic Egypt, 640–1517. Cambridge: Cambridge University Press. pp. 86–119. ISBN 0-521-47137-0.
- Brett, Michael. "The Fatimid revolution (861-973) and its aftermath in North Africa." The Cambridge History of Africa, Volume 2: c. 500 B.C. - A.D. 1050. Cambridge, UK: Cambridge University Press, 1978. ISBN 0-521-21592-7
- Gordon, Matthew S. (2001). The Breaking of a Thousand Swords: A History of the Turkish Military of Samarra (A.H. 200–275/815–889 C.E.). Albany, New York: State University of New York Press. ISBN 0-7914-4795-2.
- Gottschalk, H.L. (1971). "Ibn al-Mudabbir". In Lewis, B.; Ménage, V. L.; Pellat, Ch. & Schacht, J. (eds.). The Encyclopaedia of Islam, Second Edition. Volume III: H–Iram. Leiden: E. J. Brill. OCLC 495469525.
- Kennedy, Hugh (1998). "Egypt as a province in the Islamic caliphate, 641–868". In Petry, Carl F. (ed.). Cambridge History of Egypt, Volume One: Islamic Egypt, 640–1517. Cambridge: Cambridge University Press. pp. 62–85. ISBN 0-521-47137-0.
- Kraemer, Joel L., ed. (1989). The History of al-Ṭabarī, Volume XXXIV: Incipient Decline: The Caliphates of al-Wāthiq, al-Mutawakkil and al-Muntaṣir, A.D. 841–863/A.H. 227–248. SUNY Series in Near Eastern Studies. Albany, New York: State University of New York Press. ISBN 978-0-88706-874-4.

Preceded by Anbasah ibn Ishaq al-Dabbi	Wali of Egypt; 856–867	Succeeded by Muzahim ibn Khaqan
