= Amajur al-Turki =

9th-century Abbasid Turkic military officer

Amajur al-Turki (Arabic: أماجور التركي) (also known as Majur, Anajur and Majura) was a Turkic military officer for the Abbasid Caliphate. He served as the governor of Damascus during the caliphate of al-Mu'tamid, from 870 until his death in ca. 878.

== Career ==
Map of Abbasid Syria (Bilad al-Sham)

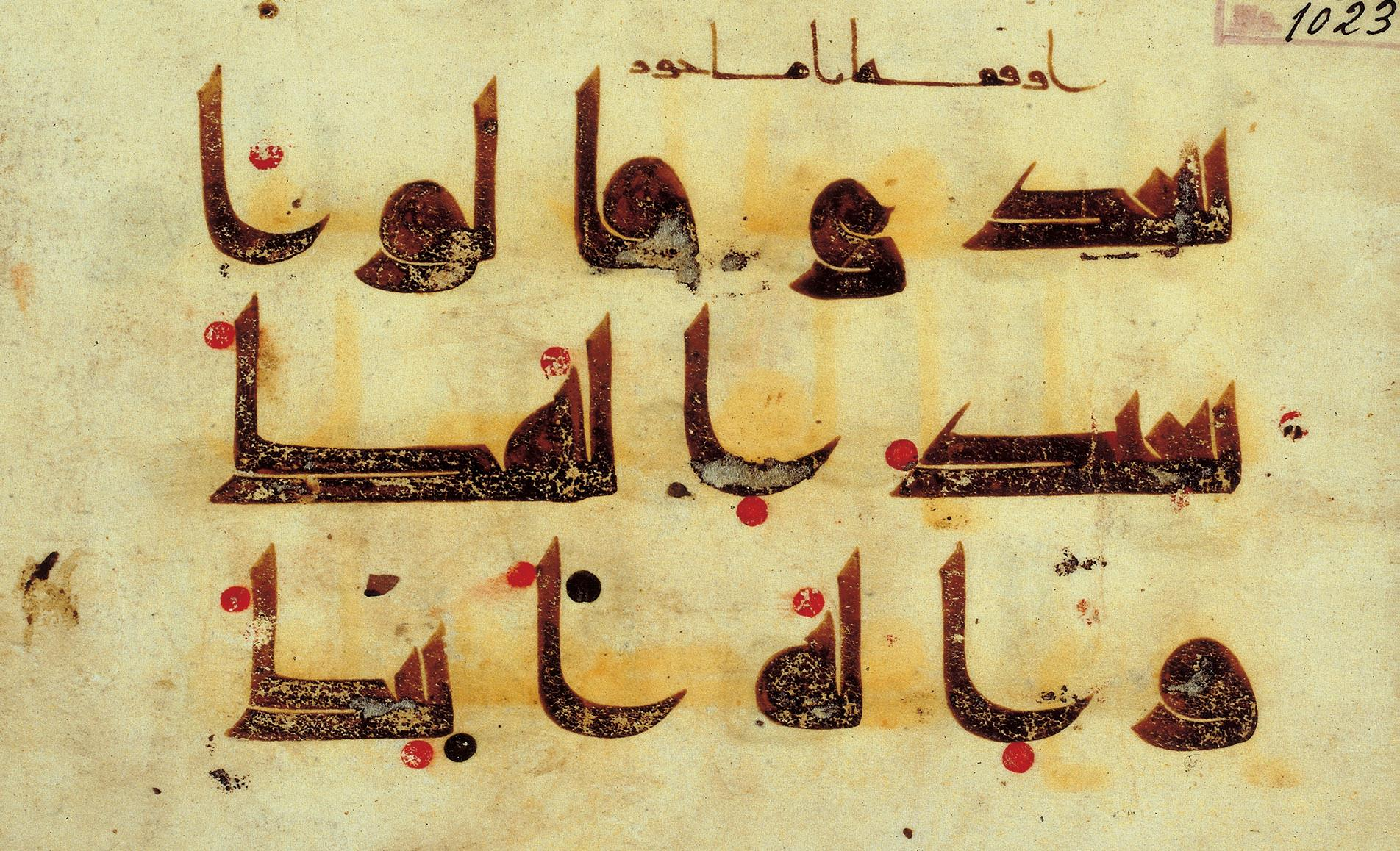
Page from the Qur'an manuscript endowed by Amajur to mosque in Tyre in 876. Turkish and Islamic Arts Museum

Little is known about Amajur outside of his governorship of Damascus; it is possible that he was related to the later Banu Amajur family of astronomers, but this is not known for certain. He received his appointment around the time of al-Mu'tamid's accession and was dispatched to Syria with a contingent of several hundred Turkish soldiers. He initially had difficulty establishing his authority within the province, due to the presence of the rebel 'Isa ibn al-Shaykh, and was forced to fight the latter in the vicinity of Damascus. Despite having a much smaller force, Amajur won the engagement, routing 'Isa's army and killing his son Mansur. Shortly after the battle, 'Isa abandoned Syria for Armenia, thereby securing Amajur's position as governor.

Over the course of the next several years, Amajur administered the province with a firm hand. He maintained a state of order, making the roads secure and cracking down against bandits, and also engaged in the building of public works. At the same time, however, an oppressive tax regime was instituted during his governorship, and a period of major inflation resulted in a general increase in poverty. In ca. 876 he presented a Qur'an to a mosque in Tyre, granting it as a waqf; several folios from this work still exist.

In ca. 877 the Abbasid regent al-Muwaffaq decided to appoint Amajur over Egypt, as its governor Ahmad ibn Tulun had been displaying signs of independence. Although Amajur was somewhat reluctant about the plan, the general Musa ibn Bugha was dispatched to enforce the decision and install him in the province. The expedition, however, stalled at Raqqa and came to an end when Musa's troops revolted against him, forcing him to return to Iraq; as a result, Ibn Tulun remained in control of Egypt.

Amajur died in ca. 878. He was briefly succeeded as governor by his minor son 'Ali; that same year, however, Ibn Tulun decided to take advantage of his death and marched into Syria, adding the province to his domains.
