= Harun ibn Muhammad ibn Ishaq al-Hashimi =

Abbasid governor and Amir al-hajj

Harun ibn Muhammad ibn Ishaq al-Hashimi هارون بن محمد بن إسحاق الهاشمي

Abbasid Governor of Hejaz
- In office 870s/880s–891/2
- Monarch: al-Mu'tamid

Amir al-hajj
- In office 878 – 892/893
- Monarch: al-Mu'tamid

Personal details
- Died: August or September 901/2 Egypt
- Relations: Abbasids, Banu Hashim
- Parent: Muhammad ibn Ishaq ibn Musa ibn Isa al-Hashimi
- Religion: Islam

Abu Musa Harun ibn Muhammad ibn Ishaq ibn Musa ibn Isa al-Hashimi (Arabic: أبو موسى هارون بن محمد بن إسحاق بن موسى بن عيسى الهاشمي; died 901) was a ninth century Abbasid personage and government official. He served as the governor of Mecca, Medina and al-Ta'if, and was a long-running leader of the annual Muslim pilgrimage.

== Career ==
A minor member of the Abbasid dynasty, Harun was descended from 'Isa ibn Musa, the nephew of the first two Abbasid caliphs al-Saffah and al-Mansur. In 878, during the reign of his fifth cousin al-Mu'tamid (r. 870–892), Harun was appointed as the leader of the hajj or annual pilgrimage to Mecca; over the next decade and a half he continuously held that position, leading all of the pilgrimages until 892 or 893. At an unspecified date he was also appointed as governor of Mecca, and was additionally given jurisdiction over the cities of Medina and al-Ta'if.

During his governorship Harun was repeatedly confronted by threats to Mecca's security and was forced to deal with recurring periods of political and economic instability. In 881/2 the city was targeted by the brigand Abu al-Mughirah al-Makhzumi, who marched against it with his forces; while Harun was successful in raising an army and stopping the advance, he was unable to prevent Abu al-Mughirah from subsequently devastating 'Ayn Mushas and Jeddah, in the process depriving Mecca of much of its drinking water and causing bread prices to soar. Harun was also faced with the political ambitions of the powerful governors Ahmad ibn Tulun of Egypt and 'Amr ibn al-Layth of Sijistan, who both sought to increase their prestige by gaining guardianship over the Holy City. In 881 and again in 883 Ibn Tulun and Ibn al-Layth each sent armed forces to assert their claims in Mecca, resulting in the outbreak of disturbances within the city; on both occasions Harun intervened with his troops to maintain order, and he played an important role in driving out the Egyptians during the Battle of Mecca in 883.

In 884/5 a disaster occurred in Mecca when a house formerly belonging to Zubaydah bint Ja'far collapsed, causing damage to the adjacent Great Mosque of Mecca and killing ten pilgrims in the process. In the aftermath of the accident, Harun and the qadi Yusuf ibn Ya'qub submitted a report to Baghdad, whereupon the caliphal regent al-Muwaffaq immediately ordered the damage to be repaired and sent funds to pay for the project. After the restoration work was completed in the following year two memorial plaques dedicated to al-Muwaffaq were hung in the mosque, one of which bearing Harun's name and the other that of the qadi and the project architect.

Harun remained as governor of Mecca until 891/2, when he was driven from the city during a period of disorder (fitnah). Following his flight he resettled in Egypt, where he died in August or September 901.
