= Ibrahim ibn al-Mudabbir =

9th-century Persian poet and Abbasid courtier

- أبو الحسن أحمد بن محمد بن عبدالله بن المدبّر

Fiscal Administrator

Personal details
- Died: 892/893
- Occupation: Poet, Fiscal Administrator
- Writing career
- Language: Arabic
- Period: Abbasid era
- Notable works: Treatise on administration, al-ʿAdhrāʾ fi mawāzīn al-balāgha wa adawāt al-kitāba

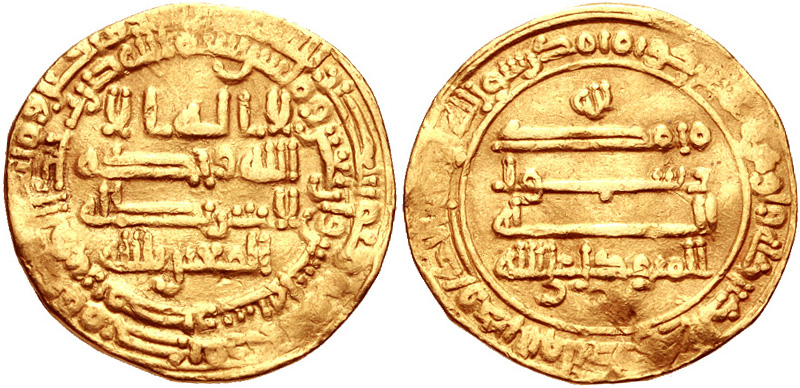
Dinar of Al Mutawakkil

Abū Isḥāq (or Abū Yusr) Ibrāhīm ibn Muḥammad ibn ʿAbdallāh ibn al-Mudabbir (Arabic: أبو الحسن أحمد بن محمد بن عبدالله بن المدبّر) commonly simply known as Ibrahim ibn al-Mudabbir, was a senior courtier and fiscal administrator for the Abbasid Caliphate.

== Biography ==
Ibrahim and his brother, Abu'l-Hasan Ahmad, were possibly of Persian origin. Both were distinguished men of letters and rose to prominence at the court of the Abbasids at Samarra.

Ibrahim rose to prominence as one of the drinking companions of Caliph al-Mutawakkil (ruled 847–861). As a result of the Caliph's favour, he became one of the most influential courtiers. His brother Ahmad was also one of the most powerful officials at the time. Vizier Ubayd Allah ibn Khaqan, threatened by the two brothers, caused both to be overthrown and imprisoned in 854/5. Unlike his brother, he remained in prison for several years; it is unknown when he was set free and was appointed tax-collector in Ahwaz. During his tenure there, he was captured by the Zanj rebels. They brought him to Basra and imprisoned him there, but he was able to escape by breaking the prison wall.

In 882, he accompanied Caliph al-Mu'tamid (r. 870–892) in his attempted flight to join Ahmad ibn Tulun, and was briefly appointed his vizier. At the time of his death in 892/893, he was head of the bureau of the caliphal private domains (dīwān al-ḍiyāʿ).

He was in all likelihood the author of a treatise on administration, al-ʿAdhrāʾ fi mawāzīn al-balāgha wa adawāt al-kitāba. Anecdotes concerning him, as well as several of his poems, including some dedicated to the famous singing girl Arib, survive in various medieval collections.

He was owner of a singing-slave-girl (Qayna) named Matal.

== Sources ==
- Gottschalk, H. L. (1986). "Ibn al-Mudabbir". The Encyclopedia of Islam, New Edition, Volume III: H–Iram. Leiden and New York: BRILL. pp. 879–880. ISBN 90-04-08118-6.
