= Al-Balawī =

10th-century Egyptian historian

Abū Muḥammad ʿAbdallah ibn Muḥammad ibn ʿUmayr Maḥfūẓ al-Madini al-Balawī (Arabic: أبو محمد عبد الله بن محمد بن عمير بن محفوظ المديني البلوي), commonly known as al-Balawī (Arabic: البلوي), was an Egyptian Arab historian of the 10th century (4th century AH). He belonged to the Arab tribe of Bali, a branch of Quda'a.

Al-Balawī was the author of several works, most notably a biography of Ahmad ibn Tulun. This was discovered in 1935 by Muḥammad Kurd ʿAli, and is one of the most important sources for the history of the Abbasid Caliphate. It was published in Arabic in 1939; there is no translation.

== Bibliography ==
- Kurd ʿAli, Muḥammad (1939). Sīrat Aḥmad b. Tūlūn (in Arabic). Damascus: al-Maktabah al-ʿArabīyah.
- Shayyal, G. E. (2012). "al-Balawī". In P.J. Bearman (ed.). Encyclopaedia of Islam, Second Edition. Vol. 1. Leiden: Brill. p. 991.
- Stancu, Anne (2010). "al-Balawī [ʾAbū Muḥammad ʿAbd Allāh ibn Muḥammad al-Madīnī al-Balawī]". In Graeme Dunphy (ed.). Encyclopedia of the Medieval Chronicle. Vol. 1. Leiden: Brill. p. 140.
