= Al-Abbas ibn Ahmad ibn Tulun =

Eldest son of the Tulunid dynasty founder, Ahmad ibn Tulun

Al-ʿAbbās ibn Aḥmad ibn Ṭūlūn was the eldest son of the founder of the Tulunid dynasty, Ahmad ibn Tulun, and heir-apparent until his failed attempt to usurp his father in 879. After a failed attempt to take over Ifriqiya, he was imprisoned in Egypt and executed shortly after the succession of his younger brother, Khumarawayh, in May 884.

== Biography ==
Abbas was the eldest son of Ahmad ibn Tulun, the son of a Turkish slave who had ruled Egypt since 868. By exploiting the dissensions in the Abbasid Caliphate between Caliph al-Mu'tamid and his brother al-Muwaffaq, Ibn Tulun soon managed to establish his autonomy from the Abbasid government, and proceeded to expand his control over Syria as well. Preoccupied with the conquest of Syria, Ibn Tulun appointed Abbas as his deputy in Egypt. Within a short time, however, his entourage persuaded him to try and seize power for himself. Forewarned by the vizier al-Wasiti, Ibn Tulun returned from Syria in April 879 and thwarted his son's ambitions. Taking the treasury with him, Abbas and his supporters—as well as an armed force numbering some 800 cavalry and 10,000 black African infantry—fled first to Alexandria and then to Barqa. Ibn Tulun tried to persuade him to return and even offered him a pardon, but Abbas refused.

Instead, he resolved to take over Ifriqiya by invading it with his army, augmented by local contingents on the way, and deposing the local Aghlabid dynasty. To legitimize his move, Abbas claimed that he had received nomination as Ifriqiya's governor by al-Mu'tamid, but the Aghlabid emir Ibrahim II responded by sending a cavalry force to meet him. Abbas defeated the local Aghlabid governor, Muhammad ibn Qurhub, sacked the town of Labda, and marched on Tripoli. The Ibadite leader and governor of Tripoli and Jabal Nafusa, Ilyas ibn Mansur al-Nafusi, mobilized resistance to the invader. His 12,000–strong army defeated Abbas in winter 880/1.

Abbas, with the remnants of his army, fled east and was defeated and captured outside Alexandria by troops loyal to his father. Brought as a prisoner to the Egyptian capital, Fustat, he was publicly paraded seated on a mule, and was commanded to execute or mutilate the most prominent of his followers, who were held responsible for urging him to rebel, by gouging their eyes and cutting off their arms. Ibn Tulun reportedly had hoped that his son might refuse this command, and was dismayed when Abbas complied. Weeping at Abbas's cruelty and untrustworthiness, Ibn Tulun ordered him flogged and imprisoned. His place in the succession was taken up by his younger brother Khumarawayh in 882. When Ibn Tulun died in May 884, Khumarawayh, enjoying the backing of the Tulunid elites, succeeded him without trouble, and Abbas was executed.

== Sources ==
- Bearman, P. J.; Bianquis, Th.; Bosworth, C. E.; van Donzel, E. & Heinrichs, W. P., eds. (2004). "al-ʿAbbās b. Aḥmad b. Ṭūlūn". The Encyclopaedia of Islam, Second Edition. Volume XII: Supplement. Leiden: E. J. Brill. p. 1. ISBN 978-90-04-13974-9.
- Bianquis, Thierry (1998). "Autonomous Egypt from Ibn Ṭūlūn to Kāfūr, 868–969". In Petry, Carl F. (ed.). The Cambridge History of Egypt, Volume 1: Islamic Egypt, 640–1517. Vol. 1. Cambridge: Cambridge University Press. pp. 86–119. ISBN 0-521-47137-0.
- Kennedy, Hugh (2004). The Prophet and the Age of the Caliphates: The Islamic Near East from the 6th to the 11th Century (Second ed.). Harlow: Longman. ISBN 978-0-582-40525-7.
- Sobernheim, Moritz (1987). "Khumārawaih". In Houtsma, Martijn Theodoor (ed.). E.J. Brill's First Encyclopaedia of Islam, 1913–1936, Volume IV: 'Itk–Kwaṭṭa. Leiden: BRILL. p. 973. ISBN 90-04-08265-4.
