= Ahmad ibn Tulun =

Emir of Egypt and Syria from 868 to 884

Ahmad ibn Tulun أحمد بن طولون

Emir of Egypt
- Reign: 15 September 868 – 10 May 884
- Predecessor: Azjur al-Turki (as Governor of Abbasid Egypt)
- Successor: Khumarawayh ibn Ahmad ibn Tulun

Emir of Syria and Al-Awasim
- Reign: 878 – 10 May 884
- Predecessor: Ali ibn Amajur (as Governor of Abbasid Syria)
- Successor: Khumarawayh ibn Ahmad ibn Tulun
- Born: c. 20 September 835 (23rd Ramadan, 220 AH); Baghdad
- Died: 10 May 884 (aged 48) al-Qata'i; Abbasid Caliphate
- Issue: al-Abbas, Khumarawayh, Rabi'ah, Shayban, and others
- Dynasty: Tulunid dynasty
- Father: Tulun
- Religion: Sunni Islam

Ahmad ibn Tulun (Arabic: أحمد بن طولون, romanized: Aḥmad ibn Ṭūlūn; c. 20 September 835 – 10 May 884) was the founder of the Tulunid dynasty that ruled Egypt and Syria between 868 and 905. An Arabized Turkic slave-soldier, in 868 Ibn Tulun was sent to Egypt as governor by the Abbasid caliph. Within four years he had established himself as a virtually independent ruler by evicting the caliphal fiscal agent, Ibn al-Mudabbir, taking over control of Egypt's finances, and establishing a large military force consisting of native Egyptians personally loyal to himself. This process was facilitated by the volatile political situation in the Abbasid court and the preoccupation of the Abbasid regent, al-Muwaffaq, with the wars against the Persian Saffarids and the Zanj Rebellion. Ibn Tulun also established an efficient administration in Egypt. After reforms to the tax system, repairs to the irrigation system, and other measures, the annual tax yield grew markedly. As a symbol of his new regime, he built a new capital, al-Qata'i, north of the old capital Fustat.

After 875/6 he entered into open conflict with al-Muwaffaq, who tried unsuccessfully to unseat him. In 878, with the support of al-Muwaffaq's brother, Caliph al-Mu'tamid, Ibn Tulun took over the governance of Syria as well as the frontier districts with the Byzantine Empire, although control of Tarsus in particular proved tenuous. During his absence in Syria, his eldest son and deputy, Abbas, tried to usurp power in Egypt, leading to the imprisonment of Abbas and the nomination of Ibn Tulun's second son, Khumarawayh, as his heir. The defection in 882 of a senior commander, Lu'lu', to al-Muwaffaq, and the defection of Tarsus, forced Ibn Tulun to return to Syria. Now virtually powerless, al-Mu'tamid tried to escape from his brother's control to Ibn Tulun's domains but was captured by al-Muwaffaq's agents, and Ibn Tulun convened an assembly of jurists at Damascus to denounce al-Muwaffaq as a usurper. His attempt in autumn 883 to bring Tarsus to heel failed, and he fell sick. Returning to Egypt, he died in May 884 and was succeeded by Khumarawayh.

== Primary sources ==
Several medieval authors wrote about Ahmad ibn Tulun. Among the major sources are the biographies written by 10th-century authors Ibn al-Daya and al-Balawi. Both are called Sirat Ahmad ibn Tulun, and al-Balawi's work relies to a large extent on Ibn al-Daya's, although it is much more extensive. Ibn al-Daya also wrote a book (Kitab al-mukafa'a) with anecdotes from the Tulunid-era Egyptian society. Further information comes from Ibn Tulun's contemporary, the geographer and traveler Ya'qubi, whose works cover the first years of his rule in Egypt, and from later Egyptian authors, especially the 15th-century historians Ibn Duqmaq and al-Maqrizi, who drew on a variety of earlier sources to write on the history of the Tulunid state. Several other medieval Arabic chroniclers from the 13th to the 16th centuries mention Ibn Tulun or his officials, but most are of a later date and not very reliable, especially in comparison to Ibn Duqmaq and al-Maqrizi.

== Life ==
=== Early life and career ===
Ahmad ibn Tulun was born on the 23rd day of the month of Ramadan 220 AH (20 September 835) or slightly later, probably in Baghdad. His father, Tulun, was a Turk from a locality known in Arabic sources as Tagharghar or Toghuz[o]ghuz, i.e., the Uyghur confederation. In the year 815/6 (200 AH) Tulun was taken captive along with other Turks, and sent as part of the tribute of the Samanid governor of Bukhara Nuh ibn Asad to the Caliph al-Ma'mun (r. 813–833), who at the time resided in Khurasan. After al-Ma'mun returned to Baghdad in 819, these Turkish slaves were formed into a guard corps of slave soldiers (ghilman, sing. ghulam) entrusted to al-Ma'mun's brother and eventual successor, al-Mu'tasim (r. 833–842). Tulun did well for himself, eventually coming to command the Caliph's private guard. Ahmad's mother, called Qasim, was one of his father's slaves. In 854/5, Tulun died, and Qasim is commonly held to have married a second time, to the Turkish general Bayakbak or Bakbak. This report, however, does not appear in Ibn al-Daya or al-Balawi, and may be spurious. According to al-Balawi, after his father's death Ahmad came under the tutelage of Yalbakh, a close companion of Tulun, who had been taken captive alongside him. At his deathbed, Tulun urged his friend to take care of his wife and son, and Bakbak thereafter treated the young Ahmad as his own son.

The young Ahmad ibn Tulun received a thorough education, involving military training at the new Abbasid capital of Samarra and studies in Islamic theology at Tarsus, acquiring a reputation not only for his knowledge but also for his pious and ascetic way of life. He became popular among his fellow Turks, who would confide secrets and entrust their money and even their women to him. While at Tarsus, Ibn Tulun fought in the frontier wars with the Byzantine Empire. There he also met another senior Turkish leader, Yarjukh, whose daughter, variously given as Majur or Khatun, became his first wife and the mother of his eldest son, Abbas, and his daughter Fatimah. The sources also report that during his time at Tarsus, Ibn Tulun had ties to Caliph al-Mutawakkil's vizier Ubayd Allah ibn Yahya ibn Khaqan, and the latter's cousin Ahmad ibn Muhammad ibn Khaqan. On one occasion, while returning to Samarra, he saved a caravan bearing a caliphal envoy returning from Constantinople from a Bedouin raiding party, and accompanied it to Samarra. This act gained him the favour of Caliph al-Musta'in (r. 862–866), as well as a thousand gold dinars and the hand of the slave Miyas, the mother of his second son, Khumarawayh. When the Caliph abdicated and went into exile at Wasit in 866, he chose Ibn Tulun to be his guard. Qubayha, the mother of the new caliph, al-Mu'tazz (r. 866–869), schemed to remove the deposed al-Musta'in, and offered Ibn Tulun the governorship of Wasit if he would murder him. Ibn Tulun refused and was replaced by another, who carried out the deed. Ibn Tulun himself played no part in the assassination, but gave his master a burial and returned to Samarra.

=== Governor of Egypt ===
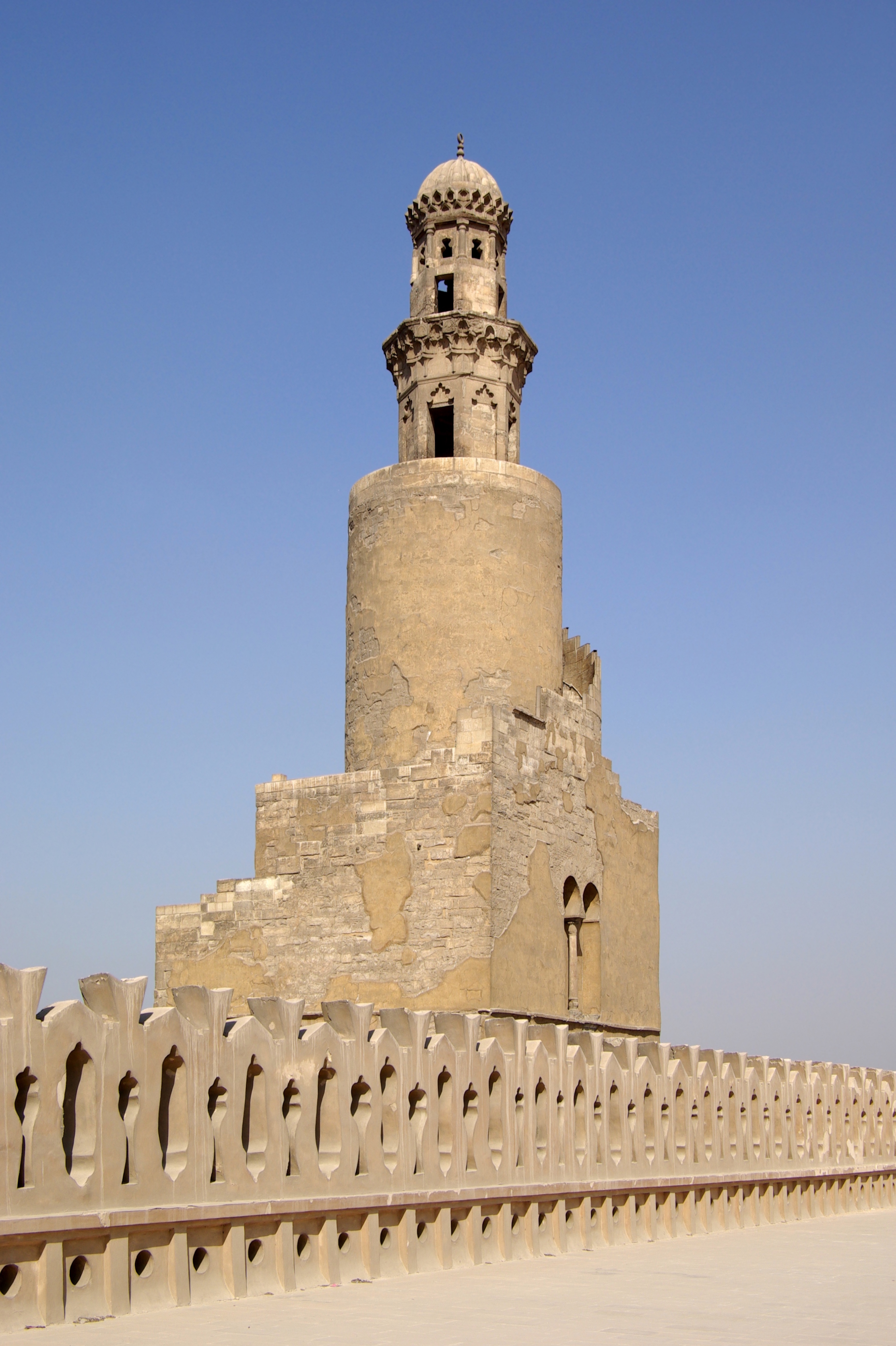
Spiral Minaret of the Mosque of Ibn Tulun in Cairo

Already under Caliph al-Mu'tasim, senior Turkish leaders began being appointed as governors of provinces of the Caliphate as a form of appanage. Thereby they secured immediate access to the province's tax revenue for themselves and their troops, bypassing the civilian bureaucracy. The Turkish generals usually remained close to the centre of power in Samarra, sending deputies to govern in their name. Thus when al-Mu'tazz gave Bakbak charge of Egypt in 868, Bakbak in turn sent his stepson Ahmad as his lieutenant and resident governor. Ahmad ibn Tulun entered Egypt on 27 August 868, and the Egyptian capital, Fustat, on 15 September.

Ibn Tulun's position after his appointment was far from undisputed within his province. As governor of Fustat he oversaw the province's garrison and was the head of the Muslim community as recognized in his title of 'overseer of the army and the Friday prayer' (wali al-jaysh wa'l-salat), but the fiscal administration, in particular the collection of the land tax (kharaj) was in the hands of the powerful veteran administrator Ibn al-Mudabbir. The latter had been appointed as fiscal agent (amil) already since c. 861, and had rapidly become the most hated man in the country as he doubled the taxes and imposed new ones on Muslims and non-Muslims alike. Ibn Tulun quickly signalled his intention to be sole master of his province: on his arrival at Fustat, when both Ibn al-Mudabbir and Shukayr, the head of the postal service (barid) and of correspondence with the caliphal government, came out to meet him with a gift of 10,000 dinars, he refused to accept it. For the next four years, Ibn Tulun and his rivals fought via their emissaries and relatives at the caliphal court in Samarra to neutralize each other; in the end, Ibn Tulun managed to secure Ibn al-Mudabbir's transfer to Syria in July 871, and assumed collection of the kharāj himself. At the same time, Ibn Tulun also secured the dismissal of Shukayr, who died shortly after. Thus by 872 Ibn Tulun had assumed control of all branches of the administration in Egypt, becoming de facto independent of the Abbasid central government.

At the time of Ibn Tulun's appointment, Egypt was undergoing a transformative process. In 834 its early Muslim elite, the Arab settler families (jund) of Fustat, lost their privileges and government pay, and power passed to officials sent by the Abbasid court. At about the same time, for the first time the Muslim population began surpassing the Coptic Christians in numbers, and the rural districts were increasingly subject to both Arabization and Islamization. The rapidity of this process, and the influx of settlers after the discovery of gold and emerald mines at Aswan, meant that Upper Egypt in particular was only superficially controlled by the local governor. Furthermore, the persistence of internecine strife and turmoil at the heart of the Abbasid state—the so-called "Anarchy at Samarra"—led to the appearance of millennialist revolutionary movements in the province under a series of Alid pretenders. One of them was Ibn al-Sufi, a descendant of Ali's son Umar, who rebelled in late 869 and massacred the populace of Esna. In winter 870 he defeated an army sent against him by Ibn Tulun, but was driven to the oases of the desert in spring. He remained there until he was defeated in a struggle with another regional strongman, Abu Abdallah ibn Abd al-Hamid al-Umari in 872, fleeing to Mecca. There he was seized and imprisoned for a while by Ibn Tulun. One of his followers, Abu Ruh Sukun, rebelled in the oases in 873/4 and was successful enough for Ibn Tulun to offer him an amnesty. Ibn al-Sufi's vanquisher, al-Umari, was another descendant of Ali who had created an autonomous principality around the gold mines, defeating the forces sent against him. Another revolt broke out in 874/5 by the governor of Barqa, Muhammad ibn al-Faraj al-Farghani. Ibn Tulun tried to reconcile with him at first but was eventually forced to send an army to besiege and storm the city, although the reprisals were limited. The re-imposition of his authority over Barqa, however, led to the strengthening of ties with Ifriqiya to the west, including, according to Ibn al-Athir, the erection of a series of lighthouses and messaging beacons along the coast.

In the meantime, in Palestine, the local governor, Isa ibn al-Shaykh al-Shaybani, had used the anarchy in Iraq to set up a quasi-independent Bedouin regime, intercepting the tax caravans from Egypt and threatening Damascus. When Caliph al-Muhtadi ascended the throne in July 869, he offered a general amnesty, and wrote to Ibn al-Shaykh, offering a pardon in exchange for him handing over the treasure he had wrongfully appropriated. When Ibn al-Shaykh refused, the Caliph ordered Ibn Tulun to march against him. Ibn Tulun complied and began a mass purchase of black African (Sudan) and Greek (Rum) slaves to form an army over the winter of 869/70, but no sooner had he arrived at al-Arish with his army in summer 870 than orders came to turn back. Ibn al-Shaykh's revolt was crushed soon after by another Turkish soldier, Amajur al-Turki, who continued to govern Syria for the Abbasids until his death in 878. This episode was nevertheless of major importance as it allowed Ibn Tulun to recruit an army of his own with caliphal sanction. The Tulunid army, which eventually grew to reportedly 100,000 men—other sources give a breakdown of 24,000 Turkish ghilman and 42,000 black African and Greek slaves, as well as a mercenary corps composed mostly of Greeks—became the foundation of Ibn Tulun's power and independence. For his personal protection, Ibn Tulun reportedly employed a corps of ghilmān from Ghur.

Ibn Tulun's stepfather Bakbak was murdered in 869/70, but luckily for him in the summer of 871 the supervision of Egypt passed to his father-in-law Yarjukh. Yarjukh not only confirmed Ibn Tulun in his post, but in addition conferred to him the authority over Alexandria and Barqa. In 873, Ibn Tulun entrusted the government of Alexandria to his eldest son, Abbas. Ibn Tulun's growing power was manifested in the establishment of a new palace city to the northeast of Fustat, called al-Qata'i, in 870. The project was a conscious emulation of, and rival to, the Abbasid capital Samarra. Just like Samarra, the new city was designed as quarters for Ibn Tulun's new army with the aim of reducing frictions with the urban populace of Fustat. Each unit received an allotment or ward (whence the city's name) to settle, after which the ward was named. The new city's centrepiece was the Mosque of Ibn Tulun, which was built in 878–880 under the supervision of the Mesopotamian Christian architect Ibn Katib al-Farghani. A royal palace adjoined the mosque, and the rest of the city was laid out around them. Beside government buildings, it included markets, a hospital (al-bimaristan) that provided services free of charge, and a hippodrome. Nevertheless, Ibn Tulun himself preferred to reside in the Coptic monastery of Qusayr outside Fustat.

=== Ibn Tulun's new regime ===
The administration of Egypt was already well developed before Ibn Tulun's arrival, with a number of departments (diwans) responsible for the collection of the land tax, the supervision of the post, the public granaries (diwan al-ahra), the Nile Delta lands (diwan asfal al-ard), and possibly a privy purse (diwan al-khass) for the governor's personal use. A chancery (diwan al-insha) possibly also already existed, or else was established under Ibn Tulun, when he remodelled the Egyptian administration after the Abbasid central government. Most of the officials employed by Ibn Tulun were like him trained in the caliphal court at Samarra. Ibn Tulun's chancellor was the capable Abu Ja'far Muhammad ibn Abd al-Kan (died 891), while other important positions in the administration were held by the four Banu al-Muhajir brothers and Ibn al-Daya. Al-Balawi also reports several anecdotes about Ibn Tulun's extensive use of spies and his own ability to uncover spies sent against him, and claims that the chancery was established so that Ibn Tulun could check up on every piece of correspondence with the caliphal court.

Unsurprisingly, given his own origins as a slave soldier, Ibn Tulun's regime was in many ways typical of the "ghulam system" that became one of the two main paradigms of Islamic polities in the 9th and 10th centuries, as the Abbasid Caliphate fragmented and new dynasties emerged. These regimes were based on the power of a regular army composed of ghilman, but in turn, according to Hugh Kennedy, "the paying of the troops was the major preoccupation of government". It is therefore in the context of the increased financial requirements that in 879, the supervision of the finances in Egypt and Syria passed to Abu Bakr Ahmad ibn Ibrahim al-Madhara'i, the founder of the al-Madhara'i bureaucratic dynasty that dominated the fiscal apparatus of Egypt for the next 70 years. Although, as Zaky M. Hassan notes, "fragmentary evidence does not permit a thorough assessment of Tulunid economic and financial policies", it appears that the peace and security provided by the Tulunid regime, the establishment of an efficient administration, and repairs and expansions to the irrigation system, coupled with a consistently high level of Nile floods, resulted in a major increase in revenue. By the time of Ibn Tulun's death, income from the land tax alone had risen from 800,000 dinars under Ibn al-Mudabbir to the sum of 4.3 million dinars, and Ibn Tulun bequeathed his successor a fiscal reserve of ten million dinars. Crucial to this was the reform of the tax assessment and collection system, including the introduction of tax farming—which at the same time led to the rise of a new landholding class. Additional revenue was collected from commercial activities, most notably textiles and in particular linen. Ibn Tulun is also said to have shown personal interest in the minting of coins; the dinars minted in Egypt during his rule are of a uniformly high standard which his successors struggled to match.

Ibn Tulun's regime was highly centralized, but also featured "consistent attempts to win the backing of Egypt's commercial, religious and social élite", according to Zaky M. Hassan. Notably, the wealthy merchant Ma'mar al-Jawhar functioned both as Ibn Tulun's personal financier and as the head of an informal intelligence network through his contacts in Iraq. A further "notable characteristic" of Ibn Tulun's rule, according to historian Thierry Bianquis, was "the quality of relations it maintained with Christians and Jews"; according to a letter by the Patriarch of Jerusalem, Elias III, when he took over Palestine, he appointed a Christian as governor of Jerusalem, and possibly even of the provincial capital, Ramla, thereby putting an end to the persecution of Christians and allowing the renovation of churches.

=== Expansion into Syria ===
Map of the Tulunid domains following the conquest of Syria, c. 881

In the early 870s, a major change took place in the Abbasid government, as the Abbasid prince al-Muwaffaq emerged as the de facto regent of the empire, sidelining his brother, Caliph al-Mu'tamid (r. 870–892). Officially, al-Muwaffaq controlled the eastern half of the Caliphate, while al-Mu'tamid's son and first heir al-Mufawwid controlled the western, with the aid of the Turkish general Musa ibn Bugha. In reality al-Muwaffaq held the actual reins of power. Al-Muwaffaq however was preoccupied with the more immediate threats to the Abbasid government presented by the rise of the Saffarids in the east and by the Zanj Rebellion in Iraq itself, as well as with keeping in check the Turkish troops and managing the internal tensions of the caliphal government. This gave Ibn Tulun the necessary space to consolidate his own position in Egypt. Ibn Tulun kept himself out of the Zanj conflict, and even refused to recognize al-Mufawwid as his suzerain, who in turn did not confirm him in his position.

Open conflict between Ibn Tulun and al-Muwaffaq broke out in 875/6, on the occasion of a large remittance of revenue to the central government. Counting on the rivalry between the Caliph and his over-mighty brother to maintain his own position, Ibn Tulun forwarded a larger share of the taxes to al-Mu'tamid instead of al-Muwaffaq: 2.2 million dinars went to the Caliph and only 1.2 million dinars to his brother. Al-Muwaffaq, who in his fight against the Zanj considered himself entitled to the major share of the provincial revenues, was angered by this, and by the implied machinations between Ibn Tulun and his brother. Al-Muwaffaq sought a volunteer to replace him, but all the officials in Baghdad had been bought off by Ibn Tulun and refused. Al-Muwaffaq sent a letter to the Egyptian ruler demanding his resignation, which the latter predictably refused. Both sides geared for war. Ibn Tulun created a fleet and fortified his borders and ports, including Alexandria, and a new fortress on Rawda Island to protect Fustat. Al-Muwaffaq nominated Musa ibn Bugha as governor of Egypt and sent him with troops to Syria. In the event, due to a combination of lack of pay and supplies for the troops, and the fear generated by Ibn Tulun's army, Musa never got further than Raqqa. After ten months of inaction and a rebellion by his troops, Musa returned to Iraq. In a public gesture of support for al-Mu'tamid and opposition to al-Muwaffaq, Ibn Tulun would assume the title of "Servant of the Commander of the Faithful" (mawlā amīr al-muʾminīn) in 878.

Ibn Tulun now seized the initiative. Having served in his youth in the border wars with the Byzantine Empire at Tarsus, he now requested to be conferred the command of the frontier districts of Cilicia (the Thughur). Al-Muwaffaq initially refused, but following the Byzantine successes of the previous years al-Mu'tamid prevailed upon his brother and in 877/8 Ibn Tulun received responsibility for the entirety of Syria and the Cilician frontier. Ibn Tulun marched into Syria in person. He received the submission of the son of Amajur, who had recently died, whom he appointed governor at Ramla, and proceeded to take possession of Damascus, Homs, Hama, and Aleppo. At Damascus Ibn Tulun encountered his old rival Ibn al-Mudabbir, who since his eviction from Egypt had served as Amajur's amil for Palestine and Damascus. Ibn al-Mudabbir was fined 600,000 dinars and thrown into prison, where he died in 883/4. In the rest of the provincial administration, however, he largely left the people who had served under Amajur in place. Only the governor of Aleppo, Sima al-Tawil, resisted, and fled to Antioch. Ibn Tulun laid siege to the city until Sima was killed, reportedly by a local woman. He then continued on to Tarsus, where he began preparing for a campaign against the Byzantines. The presence of his numerous soldiers, however, led to a rapid rise in prices, causing great hostility among the Tarsians, who demanded that he either leave or reduce his army. At this juncture, news arrived from Egypt that his son Abbas, whom he had left as his regent, was preparing to usurp his position under the influence of his entourage. Ibn Tulun hastily withdrew from Tarsus, but as more information about the situation in Egypt began to arrive, clarifying that Abbas posed no real threat, Ibn Tulun decided to spend more time in Syria and consolidate his authority. He redressed the injustices of Sima, installed troops in Aleppo (under his ghulam Lu'lu') and Harran, secured the co-operation of the Banu Kilab tribe and their leader Ibn al-Abbas, and captured the rebel Musa ibn Atamish. At some point after his takeover of Syria, Ibn Tulun ordered the refortification of Akka, a task undertaken by Abu Bakr al-Banna, the grandfather of al-Muqaddasi, who provides a detailed description of the work.

Only then, in April 879, did Ibn Tulun return to Egypt. Abbas fled west with his supporters, and from Barqa tried to take over Ifriqiya. Defeated by the Ifriqiyans (probably in the winter of 880–881), he retreated back east to Alexandria, where he was finally confronted and captured by Ibn Tulun's forces. After being publicly paraded seated on a mule, Ibn Tulun ordered his son to execute or mutilate his companions, who had driven him to rebel. Ibn Tulun reportedly secretly hoped that his son would refuse to do such a dishonourable act, but he agreed. Weeping, Ibn Tulun had Abbas whipped and imprisoned. He then named his second son, Khumarawayh, as his heir-apparent.

=== Final years and death ===
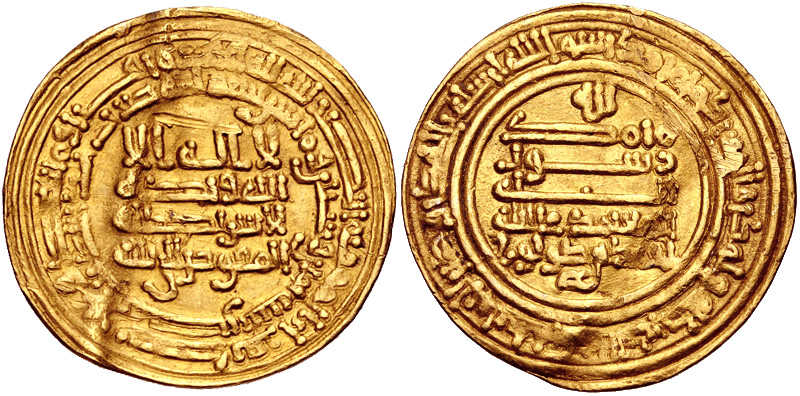
Gold dinar of Ahmad ibn Tulun minted in Fustat in 881/2 with names of Abbasid caliph al-Mu'tamid and his Heir, al-Mufawwid

Following his return from Syria, Ibn Tulun added his own name to coins issued by the mints under his control, along with those of the Caliph and heir apparent, al-Mufawwid. In the autumn of 882, the Tulunid general Lu'lu' defected to the Abbasids. At the same time, the Tulunid-appointed governor of Tarsus and the Thughur died, and his replacement, Yazaman al-Khadim, with popular backing, refused to acknowledge Tulunid rule. Ibn Tulun immediately left in person for Syria—taking the chained Abbas with him as a precaution—and headed for Tarsus. At Damascus, he received a message from al-Mu'tamid informing him that the by-now nearly powerless Caliph had escaped Samarra and was heading for Syria. Taking custody of al-Mu'tamid would have immensely boosted Ibn Tulun's standing: not only would the sole source of political legitimacy in the Muslim world reside under his control, but he would also be able to pose as the "rescuer" of the Caliph. Ibn Tulun therefore decided to halt and await al-Mu'tamid's arrival. In the event, however, the Caliph was overtaken at al-Haditha on the Euphrates by the governor of Mosul, Ishaq ibn Kundaj, who defeated the caliphal escort and brought him back to Samarra (February 883) and thence south to Wasit, where al-Muwaffaq could better control him. This opened anew the rift between the two rulers: al-Muwaffaq nominated Ishaq ibn Kundaj as governor of Egypt and Syria—in reality a largely symbolic appointment—while Ibn Tulun organized an assembly of religious jurists at Damascus which denounced al-Muwaffaq as a usurper, condemned his maltreatment of the Caliph, declared his place in the succession as void, and called for a jihad against him. Only three participants, including the chief qadi of Egypt, Bakkar ibn Qutayba, refused to pronounce the call for jihad publicly. Ibn Tulun had his rival duly denounced in Friday sermons in the mosques across the Tulunid domains, while the Abbasid regent responded in kind with a ritual denunciation of Ibn Tulun. Despite the belligerent rhetoric, however, neither made moves to confront the other militarily.

After his failure to take control of the Caliph, Ibn Tulun turned on Tarsus. He appointed Abdallah ibn Fath in Lu'lu's place in Aleppo, and marched in person to Cilicia. The Egyptian ruler laid siege to Tarsus in autumn 883, but Yazaman diverted the local river, inundating the Tulunid camp and forcing Ibn Tulun to retreat. Ibn Tulun fell ill on his return to Egypt, and was carried to Fustat on a wheeled vehicle. In the same year, a campaign to take over the two holy cities of Islam, Mecca and Medina, also failed. Back in Egypt, he ordered Bakkar to be arrested and replaced him with Muhammad ibn Shadhan al-Jawhari. A thorough examination of Bakkar's accounts while head of the charitable endowments, however, revealed no misappropriations. Although Ibn Tulun ordered him released, the elderly and sick qadi refused to leave his cell. At the same time, the illness of Ibn Tulun himself worsened. "Muslims, Christians and Jews, including women and children, converged separately upon the flank of the Muqattam to implore God to save him", as Bianquis writes, but Ibn Tulun died at Fustat on 10 May 884 and was interred on the slopes of the Muqattam. According to al-Balawi, Ibn Tulun left his heir 24,000 servants, 7,000 men and 7,000 horses, 3,000 camels, 1,000 mules, 350 ceremonial horses, and 200 fully equipped warships.

=== Succession and aftermath ===
At Ibn Tulun's death, Khumarawayh, with the backing of the Tulunid elites, succeeded without opposition. Ibn Tulun bequeathed his heir "with a seasoned military, a stable economy, and a coterie of experienced commanders and bureaucrats". Khumarawayh was able to preserve his authority against the Abbasid attempt to overthrow him at the Battle of Tawahin and even made additional territorial gains, but his extravagant spending exhausted the treasury, and his assassination in 896 began the rapid decline of the Tulunid regime. Internal strife sapped Tulunid power. Khumarawayh's son Jaysh was a drunkard who executed his uncle, Mudar ibn Ahmad ibn Tulun; he was deposed after only a few months and replaced by his brother Harun ibn Khumarawayh. Harun too was a weak ruler, and although a revolt by his uncle Rabi'ah in Alexandria was suppressed, the Tulunids were unable to confront the attacks of the Qarmatians which began at the same time. In addition, many commanders defected to the Abbasids, whose power revived under the capable leadership of al-Muwaffaq's son, Caliph al-Mu'tadid (r. 892–902). Finally, in December 904, two other sons of Ibn Tulun, Ali and Shayban, murdered their nephew and assumed control of the Tulunid state. Far from halting the decline, this event alienated key commanders in Syria and led to the rapid and relatively unopposed reconquest of Syria and Egypt by the Abbasids under Muhammad ibn Sulayman al-Katib, who entered Fustat in January 905. With the exception of the great Mosque of Ibn Tulun, the victorious Abbasid troops pillaged al-Qata'i and razed it.

=== Offspring ===
According to al-Balawi, from his various wives and concubines, Ibn Tulun had 33 children, 17 sons and 16 daughters. The only modern edition of al-Balawi provides the following list:

- Male children: Abū al-Faḍl al-ʿAbbās (the eldest), Abū al-Jaysh Khumārawayh, Abū al-Ashāʾir Muḍar, Abū al-Mukarram Rabīʿah, Abū al-Maqānib Shaybān, Abū Nāhiḍ 'Iyāḍ, Abū Maʿd ʿAdnān, Abū al-Karādīs Kazraj, Abū Ḥabshūn ʿAdī, Abū Shujāʿ Kindah, Abū Manṣūr Aghlab, Abū Lahjah Maysarah, Abū al-Baqāʾ Hudā, Abū al-Mufawwaḍ Ghassān, Abū al-Faraj Mubārak, Abū ʿAbdallāh Muhammad, and Abū al-Fataj Muẓaffar.
- Female children (note that only 15 names are listed): Fāṭimah, Lamīs, (unreadable), Ṣafiyyah, Khadījah, Maymūnah, Maryam, ʿĀʾishah, Umm al-Hudā, Muʾminah, ʿAzīzah, Zaynab, Samānah, Sārah, and Ghurayrah.
- Shams al-Din Muhammad ibn Tulun Al-Salihi (1475–1546), the 15th-century Damascene historian

== Legacy ==
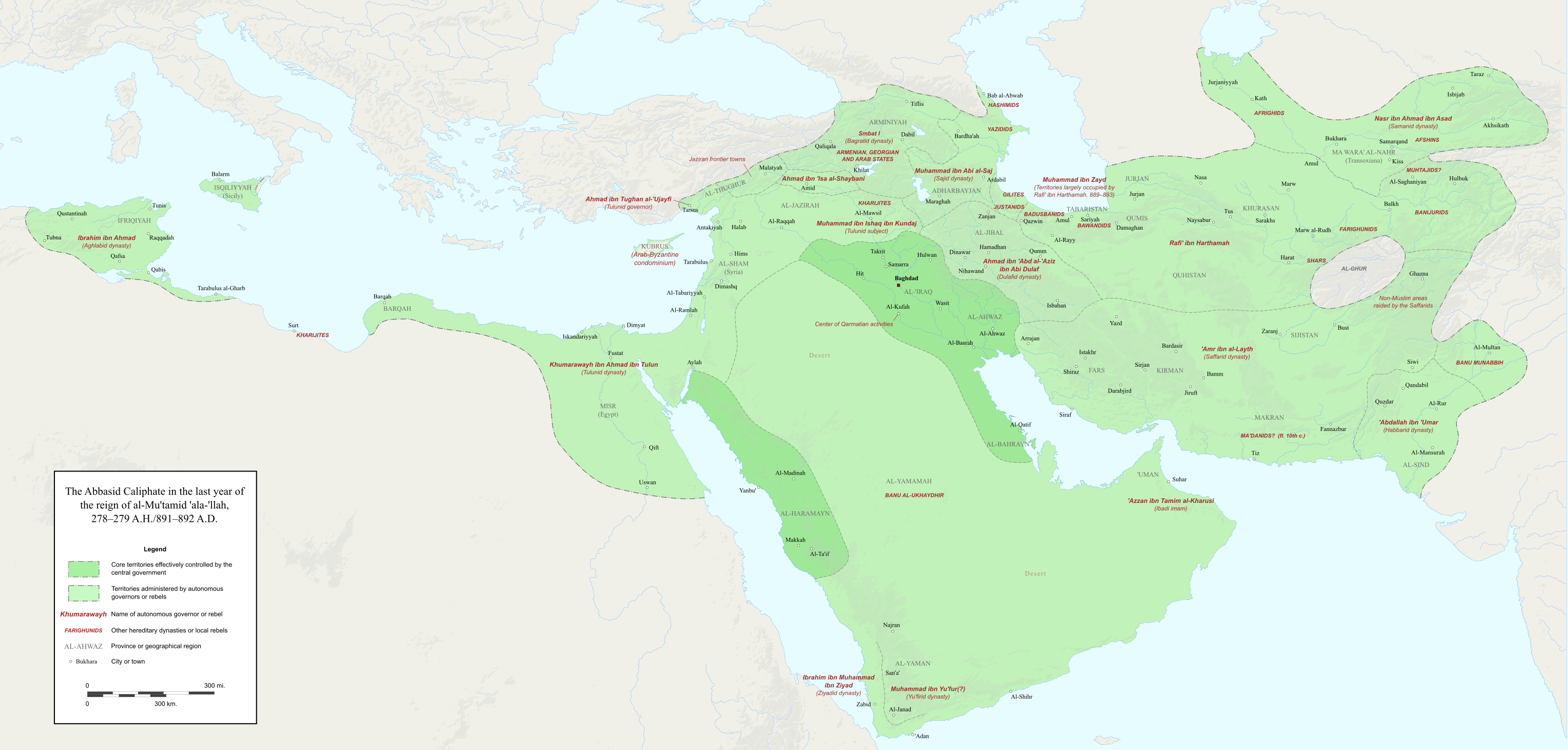
Map of the fragmented Abbasid empire, with areas still under direct control of the Abbasid central government (dark green) and under autonomous rulers (light green) adhering to nominal Abbasid suzerainty, c. 892

Despite the brief duration of his dynasty, Ibn Tulun's rule was a seminal event not only for Egypt, but for the entire Islamic world. For Egypt itself, his reign marks a turning point as the country for the first time since the Pharaohs ceased being a passive province subject to a foreign imperial power, and became once again a political actor in its own right. The new realm Ibn Tulun forged, encompassing Egypt and Syria as well as the Jazira and Cilicia, and to a lesser extent the eastern parts of the Maghreb, established a new political zone separated from the Islamic lands further east, restoring in a fashion the frontier that had existed between the Roman/Byzantine and Sassanid Persian realms in Antiquity. Egypt was the basis of Ibn Tulun's power; he paid particular attention to restoring its economy, as well as establishing an autonomous bureaucracy, army, and navy. These policies were continued by later Egypt-based regimes, the Ikhshidids (935–969) and eventually the Fatimids (969–1171), who likewise used Egypt's wealth to establish control over parts or even most of Syria. Indeed, as Thierry Bianquis remarks, the territory ruled by Ibn Tulun in Syria was remarkably similar to that controlled by the later Egypt-based regimes of Saladin and the Mamluk Sultanate.

According to the historian Matthew Gordon, Ibn Tulun's relations with, and quest for autonomy from, the Abbasids is a "central problem of Tulunid history". Modern scholars see in Ibn Tulun's policies a "careful balancing act" and notice that he never fully severed himself from the Caliphate, remaining conspicuously loyal to the person of al-Mu'tamid, who, after all, was a powerless figurehead. Nevertheless, the move towards increasing autonomy is evident throughout his reign. His relations with the Abbasid government were dominated by his conflict with al-Muwaffaq, resulting from the latter's attempts to establish control over Egypt—whose wealth was direly needed during the costly war against the Zanj—and prevent the further rise of Ibn Tulun. In a certain sense, writes Matthew Gordon, many of Ibn Tulun's measures "were as much the means by which imperial interests were protected against the ambitions of al-Muwaffaq and his (largely Turkish) military coterie in Iraq as they were efforts to secure Tulunid authority". Given that Ibn Tulun at least twice (in 871 and 875/6) remitted huge sums to the caliphal treasury, it remains an open question whether without the conflict with al-Muwaffaq, this would have been a more regular occurrence.

Nevertheless, in retrospective, Ibn Tulun's role in the wider context of Islamic history is as the herald of the Abbasid Caliphate's disintegration and the rise of local dynasties in the provinces. This became particularly evident with the succession of Khumarawayh: as Thierry Bianquis explains, "this was the first time in Abbasid history with regard to the government of so large and rich a territory, that a wāli, whose legitimacy derived from the caliph who had designated him, was succeeded openly by an amīr who claimed his legitimacy by inheritance". Thus Zaky M. Hassan calls Ibn Tulun a "typical example of the Turkish slaves who from the time of Harun al-Rashid were enlisted in the private service of the caliph and the principal officers of state, and whose ambition and spirit of intrigue and independence [eventually made] them the real masters of Islam".

== See also ==
- List of rulers of Egypt

== Sources ==
- Al-Balawi, Abu Muhammad 'Abdallah ibn Muhammad al-Madini (1939). Kurd 'Ali, Muhammad (ed.). Sirat Ahmad ibn Tulun. Cairo: Maktabat al-Thaqafah al-Diniyyah.
- Becker, C. H. (1987). "Aḥmed b. Ṭūlūn". In Houtsma, Martijn Theodoor (ed.). E.J. Brill's First Encyclopaedia of Islam, 1913–1936, Volume I: A–Bābā Beg. Leiden: BRILL. pp. 190–191. ISBN 90-04-08265-4.
- Bianquis, Thierry (1998). "Autonomous Egypt from Ibn Ṭūlūn to Kāfūr, 868–969". In Petry, Carl F. (ed.). The Cambridge History of Egypt: Islamic Egypt, 640–1517. Vol. 1. Cambridge: Cambridge University Press. pp. 86–119. ISBN 0-521-47137-0.
- Bonner, Michael (2010). "The waning of empire, 861–945". In Robinson, Chase F. (ed.). The New Cambridge History of Islam, Volume 1: The Formation of the Islamic World, Sixth to Eleventh Centuries. Cambridge: Cambridge University Press. pp. 305–359. ISBN 978-0-521-83823-8.
- Brett, Michael (2010). "Egypt". In Robinson, Chase F. (ed.). The New Cambridge History of Islam, Volume 1: The Formation of the Islamic World, Sixth to Eleventh Centuries. Cambridge: Cambridge University Press. pp. 506–540. ISBN 978-0-521-83823-8.
- Cobb, Paul M. (2001). White Banners: Contention in 'Abbāsid Syria, 750–880. Albany, NY: State University of New York Press. ISBN 0-7914-4880-0.
- Corbet, Eustace K. (1891). "The Life and Works of Aḥmad ibn Ṭūlūn". The Journal of the Royal Asiatic Society of Great Britain and Ireland: 527–562. ISSN 0035-869X. JSTOR 25197067.
- Ehrenkreutz, Andrew S. (1959). "Studies in the Monetary History of the Near East in the Middle Ages: The Standard of Fineness of Some Types of Dinars". Journal of the Economic and Social History of the Orient. 2 (2): 128–161. JSTOR 3596018.
- Gil, Moshe (1997) [1983]. A History of Palestine, 634–1099. Translated by Ethel Broido. Cambridge: Cambridge University Press. ISBN 0-521-59984-9.
- Gordon, Matthew S. (2000). "Ṭūlūnids". In Bearman, P. J.; Bianquis, Th.; Bosworth, C. E.; van Donzel, E. & Heinrichs, W. P. (eds.). The Encyclopaedia of Islam, Second Edition. Volume X: T–U. Leiden: E. J. Brill. pp. 616–618. ISBN 978-90-04-11211-7.
- Gordon, Matthew S. (2001). The Breaking of a Thousand Swords: A History of the Turkish Military of Samarra (A.H. 200–275/815–889 C.E.). Albany, New York: State University of New York Press. ISBN 0-7914-4795-2.
- Hassan, Zaky M. (1960). "Aḥmad b. Ṭūlūn". In Gibb, H. A. R.; Kramers, J. H.; Lévi-Provençal, E.; Schacht, J.; Lewis, B. & Pellat, Ch. (eds.). The Encyclopaedia of Islam, Second Edition. Volume I: A–B. Leiden: E. J. Brill. pp. 278–279. OCLC 495469456.
- Kennedy, Hugh (2004) [1986]. The Prophet and the Age of the Caliphates: The Islamic Near East from the 6th to the 11th Century (Second ed.). Harlow: Longman. ISBN 978-0-582-40525-7.
- Swelim, Tarek (2015). Ibn Tulun: His Lost City and Great Mosque. Cairo: The American University in Cairo Press. ISBN 978-977-416-691-4.

Preceded by Azjur al-Turki as governor of Egypt for the Abbasid Caliphate	Tulunid emir of Egypt (de jure for the Abbasid Caliphate, de facto autonomous); 15 September 868 – 10 May 884	Succeeded by Khumarawayh ibn Ahmad ibn Tulun
Preceded by Amajur al-Turki as governor of Syria for the Abbasid Caliphate	Tulunid emir of Syria (de jure for the Abbasid Caliphate, de facto autonomous); 877/8 – 10 May 884	Succeeded by Khumarawayh ibn Ahmad ibn Tulun
