= Abu'l-Hasan Ahmad ibn Muhammad ibn Abdallah ibn al-Mudabbir =

9th-century Abbasid senior courtier

- أبو الحسن أحمد بن محمد بن عبدالله بن المدبّر
- Born: 9th century Possibly of Persian origin
- Died: 883/4; Egypt
- Occupations: Poet, Fiscal Administrator
- Writing career
- Language: Arabic
- Notable works: Kitāb al-Mujālasa wa ’l-mudhākara (Book of Companionship and Conversation)

Abu’l-Ḥasan Aḥmad ibn Muḥammad ibn ʿAbdallāh ibn al-Mudabbir (Arabic: أبو الحسن أحمد بن محمد بن عبدالله بن المدبّر) commonly simply known as Ibn al-Mudabbir, was a senior courtier and fiscal administrator for the Abbasid Caliphate, serving in the central government, in Syria and Egypt. He is best known for his unsuccessful power struggle for control of Egypt against Ahmad ibn Tulun in 868–871.

== Biography ==
Abu'l-Hasan and his brother, Abu Ishaq Ibrahim, were possibly of Persian origin. Both were distinguished men of letters and rose to prominence at the court of the Abbasids at Samarra. Abu'l-Hasan first appears as director of the department of the army (dīwān al-jaysh) under Caliph al-Wathiq (ruled 842–847). Under al-Mutawakkil (r. 847–861), he rose further. The Caliph esteemed his ability as a poet, and appointed him to oversee seven dīwāns, possibly as a sort of deputy vizier. In 854, however, the current vizier, Ubayd Allah ibn Khaqan, seeing in him a dangerous rival, had him imprisoned.

This disgrace did not last long, and soon he was released and appointed as fiscal administrator (ʿāmil al-kharāj, "supervisor of the land tax") for the Syrian districts of Damascus and Jordan. From there he moved, probably in 861, to the same post in Egypt. To boost the province's revenue, he took a series of measures, including doubling the kharāj and the jizya and raising new taxes (mukūs)—a move widely denounced as un-Quranic, demanding the payment of taxes each lunar year (instead of the longer solar year), imposing a state monopoly on caustic soda, and depriving the Christian clergy of their traditional tax privileges and exemptions. As a result, he became both the most powerful, as well as the most hated man in Egypt, and was constantly escorted by a hundred young bodyguards.

His fall began in September 868, with the arrival of a new governor of Egypt, Ahmad ibn Tulun. Abu'l-Hasan tried to win Ibn Tulun over by offering him a large cash gift, but Ibn Tulun refused. For the next four years, the two men conducted a struggle for power both within Egypt, as well as through their relatives and envoys at the Abbasid court. Ibn Tulun emerged the victor from this contest: in 871 he overthrew and imprisoned Abu'l-Hasan, confiscated his possessions, and took over the fiscal administration of Egypt himself.

Abu'l-Hasan was released and sent to Syria (871/2), where he took up again his old post as ʿāmil for Damascus and Jordan, as well as for Palestine. In 877, however, Ibn Tulun took over Syria as well, and upon his entry in Damascus Abu'l-Hasan was imprisoned and forced to pay a ransom of 600,000 dirhams. He was then brought to Egypt, where he died, still imprisoned, in 883/4.

Ibn al-Nadim's Kitāb al-Fihrist reports that he was the author of a now lost Kitāb al-Mujālasa wa ’l-mudhākara ("Book of Companionship and Conversation"), while scattered poems and anecdotes concerning his life are preserved in various collections and historical works.

== Sources ==
- Bianquis, Thierry (1998). "Autonomous Egypt from Ibn Ṭūlūn to Kāfūr, 868–969". In Petry, Carl F. (ed.). The Cambridge History of Egypt: Islamic Egypt, 640–1517. Vol. 1. Cambridge: Cambridge University Press. pp. 86–119. ISBN 0-521-47137-0.
- Gottschalk, H. L. (1971). "Ibn al-Mudabbir". In Lewis, B.; Ménage, V. L.; Pellat, Ch. & Schacht, J. (eds.). The Encyclopaedia of Islam, Second Edition. Volume III: H–Iram. Leiden: E. J. Brill. pp. 879–880. OCLC 495469525.
