= Muhammad ibn Yusuf al-Kindi =

Egyptian Arab historian (897-961)

- أبو عمر محمد بن يوسف الكندي

Personal life
- Born: January 18, 897 Egypt
- Died: October 16, 961 Fustat
- Resting place: Egypt
- Children: Umar
- Parent: Yusuf al-Kindi (father)
- Era: Middle Abbasid era
- Notable works: Tasmiyat Wulat Misr (The Enumeration of the Rulers of Egypt); Al-Qudat (The Judges)
- Known for: Arab Historian and Islamic Scholar

Religious life
- Religion: Islam
- Creed: Hanafi

Abu Umar Muhammad ibn Yusuf al-Kindi (Arabic: أبو عمر محمد بن يوسف الكندي) (January 18, 897 – October 16, 961) was a prominent Arab historian, genealogist, and hadith scholar. He studied under the most famous hadith scholar of his time, imam al-Nasa'i.

== Biography ==
A descendant of the tribe of Banu Kindah, al-Kindi was born in Egypt to the Tujib clan. Although few details of his life are known, he is reported to have received an education on the Quran and hadith under Ali ibn al-Hasan ibn Qudayd and Abu Abd al-Rahman al-Nasa'i, and was later a transmitter of hadith himself. As a faqih he belonged to the Hanafi school of jurisprudence. He died in Fustat in 961 and was succeeded in his literary work by his son Umar.

Al-Kindi is chiefly famous for his two surviving works, Tasmiyat Wulat Misr ("The Enumeration of the Rulers of Egypt") and Al-Qudat ("The Judges"), which together represent a key source of Egyptian provincial history and its political and legal institutions during the early Islamic era. Rulers, which provides an account of the governors of Egypt appointed by the caliphs and the major events that took place during their administrations, covers the period from the Islamic conquest in 641 until the death of Muhammad ibn Tughj al-Ikhshid in 946, with a supplemental continuation by an unknown author extending to the coming of the Fatimids in 969. Judges is dedicated to the succession of Egyptian qadis from 661 until 861, with two continuations that extend to the mid-eleventh century. Both works represent an early example of provincial historiography and have been used extensively by later authors.

The two works are preserved in a manuscript held by the British Museum. An edited version was published under the title The Governors and Judges of Egypt by Rhuvon Guest in 1912.

== List of works ==
- "The Western Contingents" (Al-Jund al-Gharbi or al-Ajnād al-Gharabāʾ)
- "The Book of the Moat and Rests" (Kitāb al-Khandaq wa-al-Tarāwīḥ) — Possibly concerning the moat dug by Abd al-Rahman ibn Jahdam al-Fihri in 684 to defend Fustat during the conflict between the Umayyads and Zubayrids
- "Sites" (Al-Khiṯaṯ) — Likely an account of various sites in Fustat
- "The History of the Great Mosque of the People of the Standard" (Akhbār Masjid Ahl al-Rāyah al-Aẓam) — Regarding the Mosque of Amr ibn al-As in Fustat
- "The Life of al-Sari ibn al-Hakam" or "The Life of Marwan ibn al-Ja'd" (Sīrat al-Sarī ibn al-Ḥakam / Marwān ibn al-Ja'd) — Presumably a biography of either the ninth century Egyptian governor al-Sari ibn al-Hakam or the last Umayyad caliph Marwan ibn Muhammad al-Ja'di
- "The Book of Clients" (Kitāb al-Mawālī) — Likely an account of important Egyptian mawali
- "The Enumeration of the Rulers of Egypt" or "The Rulers of Egypt" (Tasmiyat Wulāt Miṣr or ʾUmarāʾ Miṣr)
- "The Judges" (Al-Quḍat)

Another surviving work, the "Virtues of Egypt" (Faḍāʿil Miṣr) is sometimes attributed to al-Kindi, but is believed to have instead been produced by his son Umar.

== See also ==
- List of Islamic historians
