= 10th century in Lebanon =

- Key event(s)
- Anti-Fatimid and Anti-Ikhshidid revolts, Byzantine resurgence, birth of the founder of the Druze religion
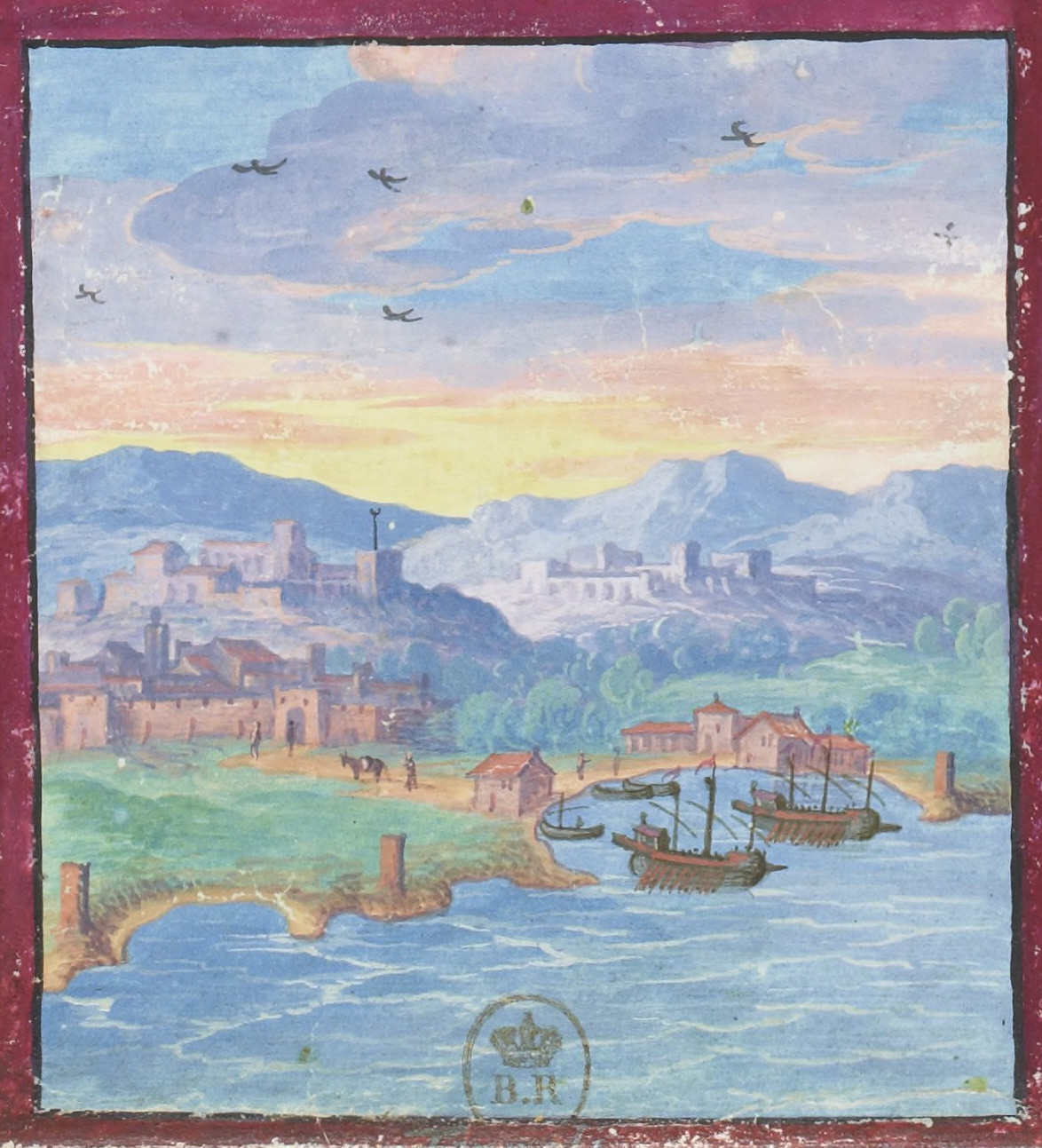
- A painting dating back to 1578 AD of the city of Tripoli, Lebanon, whose people revolted against the Ikhshidids due to the governor's tyranny.
- Chronology
- ← 9th century; 10th century; 11th century →

This article lists historical events that occurred between 901–1000 in modern-day Lebanon or regarding its people.

== Administration ==
=== Qarmatians ===
Baalbek witnessed turbulent conditions when the Qarmatians appeared in the Levant in the year 290 AH / 905 AD under the command of Al-Hussein bin Zikrawayh bin Mehrawih, who succeeded his brother Yahya bin Zikrawayh, the founder of the Qarmatian revolt, and Al Hussein succeeded in occupying Damascus and Homs. And his forces started a series of devastating theft and extreme looting. In the same year he marched to Baalbek and put the sword to the necks of its people, killing the majority of its inhabitants, and contemporary historians' statements confirm his harsh revenge against the people of Baalbek, and do not give a reason for the killing. Al-Tabari and Ibn Al-Atheer agreed on the following statement: “He killed most of its people until there was nothing left of them - as was said - except for a little, then he killed the animals.”

=== Tulunids ===
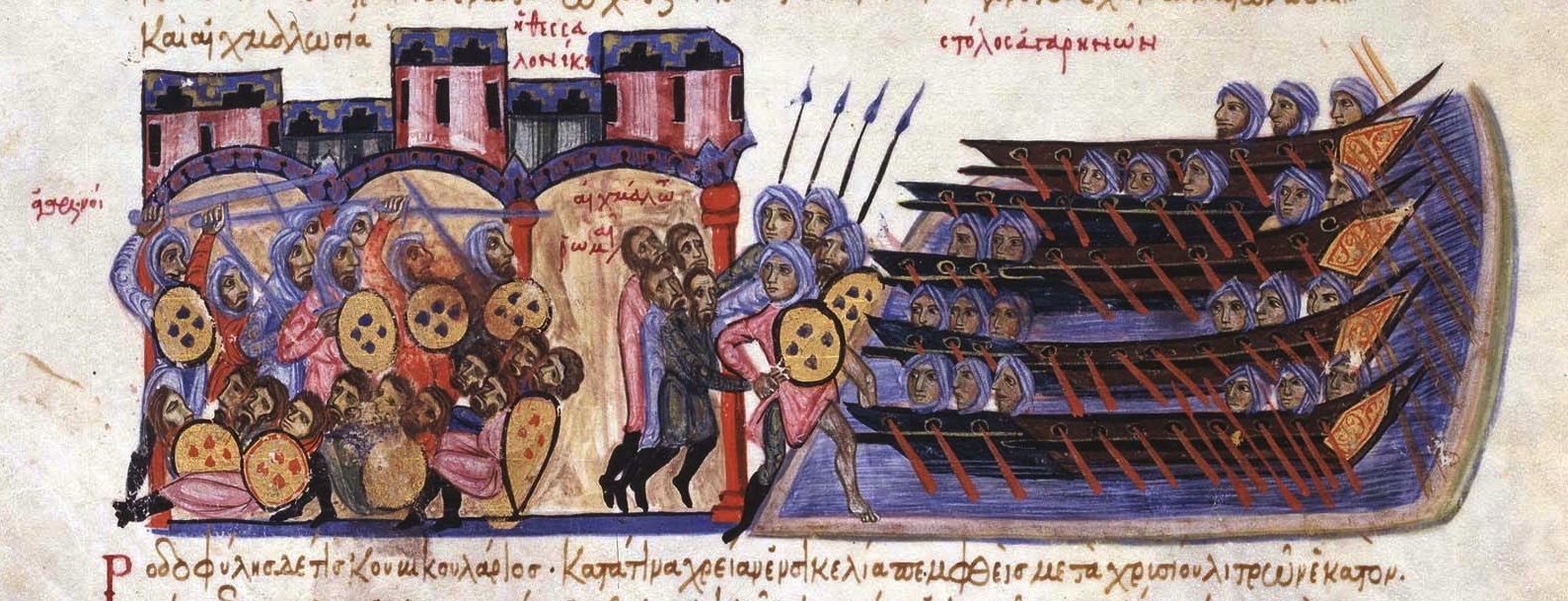
Byzantine miniature painting depicting Leo of Tripoli sacking Thessalonica.

The Tulunids were overthrown by the sailor Demian, known as “Demian of Tyre,” who was famously known for repelling the Byzantines, along with the great sailor Leo of Tripoli, the Tyrian naval fleet achieved a victory over the Byzantines under the leadership of the Qadi Muhammad ibn al-Abbas al-Jamahi in the year 296 AH / 908 AD.

=== Abbasids ===
Under the command of Ibn Zakarwayh, Baalbek disobeyed al-Muktafi and began to pray and preach to the leader of the Qarmatians. But Muhammad bin Suleiman, a senior official and commander of the Abbasid Caliphate, was able to return the whole of the Levant to the fold of the caliphate after he got rid of its Qarmatian influence and put down their revolution in the year 291 AH / 906 AD. Baalbek returned to the authority of the Abbasids.

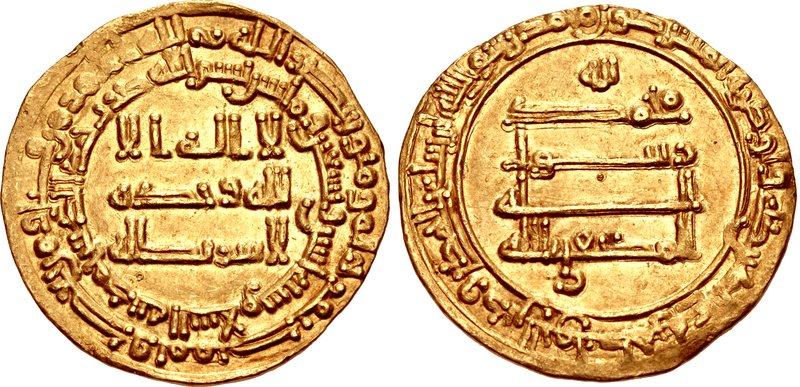
Gold dinar of al-Muktafi, minted at Baghdad in 904/5

Tyre re-entered the possession of the Abbasid leader "Muhammad bin Ra'iq" in the year 327 AH / 938 AD, where he stayed for some time with a Ghulam named Mashreq. And before Ibn Ra’iq went to Baghdad in the year 329 AH / 940 AD, he gave Tyre and Jordan to “Badr bin Ammar” the ruler of Tiberias - also said to be the ruler of Tripoli.

=== Ikhshidids ===
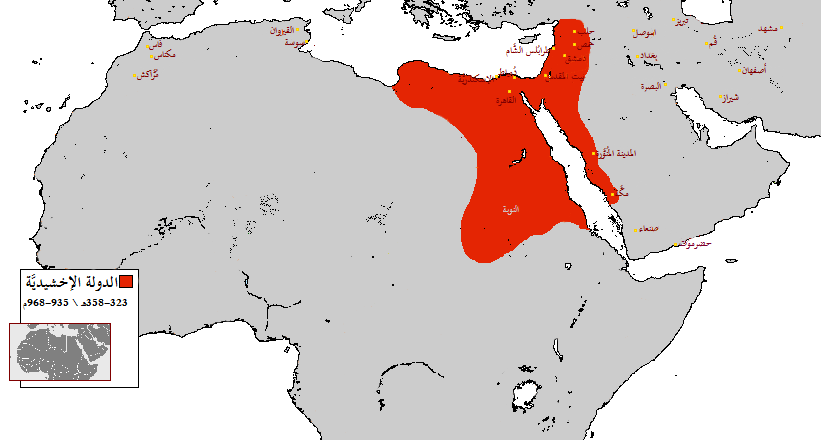
Map showing the extent of the Ikhshidid state

Baalbek was oscillating between the rule of the Ikhshidids and the Hamdanids. Following the death of Muhammad bin Ra’iq, the Abbasid leader of the Levant in the year 330 AH / 941 AD, Muhammad bin Tughj, nicknamed Ikhshid, annexed the Levant to Egypt, and in the year 333 AH / 944 AD the Abbasid ruler Al-Mustakfi approved him over Egypt and the Levant.

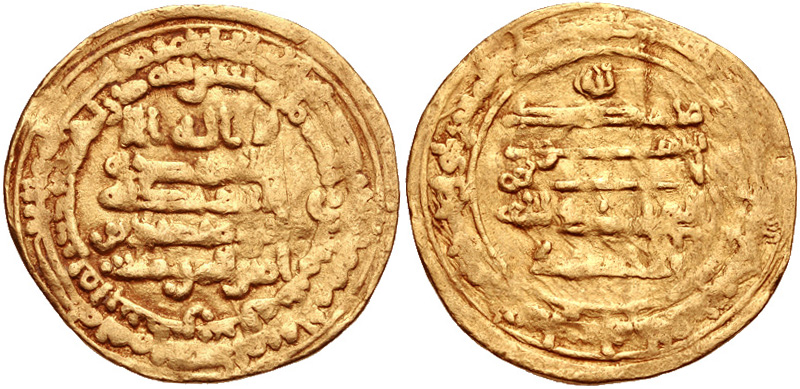
Dinar minted in Palestine under al-Ikhshid, 944 CE. From 942 on, Ibn Tughj included his name and title ("Muhammad al-Ikhshid"), alongside that of the caliph in his coinage.

=== Revolt of Tripoli ===
In Tripoli, 357 AH corresponding to the year 968 AD, there was a revolution against the Ikhshidid rule as a result of the tyranny of the governor, Abu al-Hasan Ahmed bin Ghurair al-Arghli, and his injustice and cruelty in the treatment of the people. It is known that Tripoli was affiliated at the time to the Wilayat of Damascus, and that the Damascene wali is the one who appoints the governor of Tripoli. The people expelled the ruler from the city, so he settled in the fortress of Arqa and fortified it, and the residents of Tripoli became without a ruler or an Amir. In the meantime, the Byzantine Emperor Nikephoros Phocas II arrived in Tripoli during his campaign in the Levant, aiming to seize the region from Muslim control. By this point, he had already captured the northern part of the country, including Arqa. He arrested Abu Al-Hassan bin Ghurair Al-Arghli and took all his money, then he went to Tripoli and went down to it on the day of Eid Al-Adha and stayed in it that night and burned its territory and returned to the coastal countries.

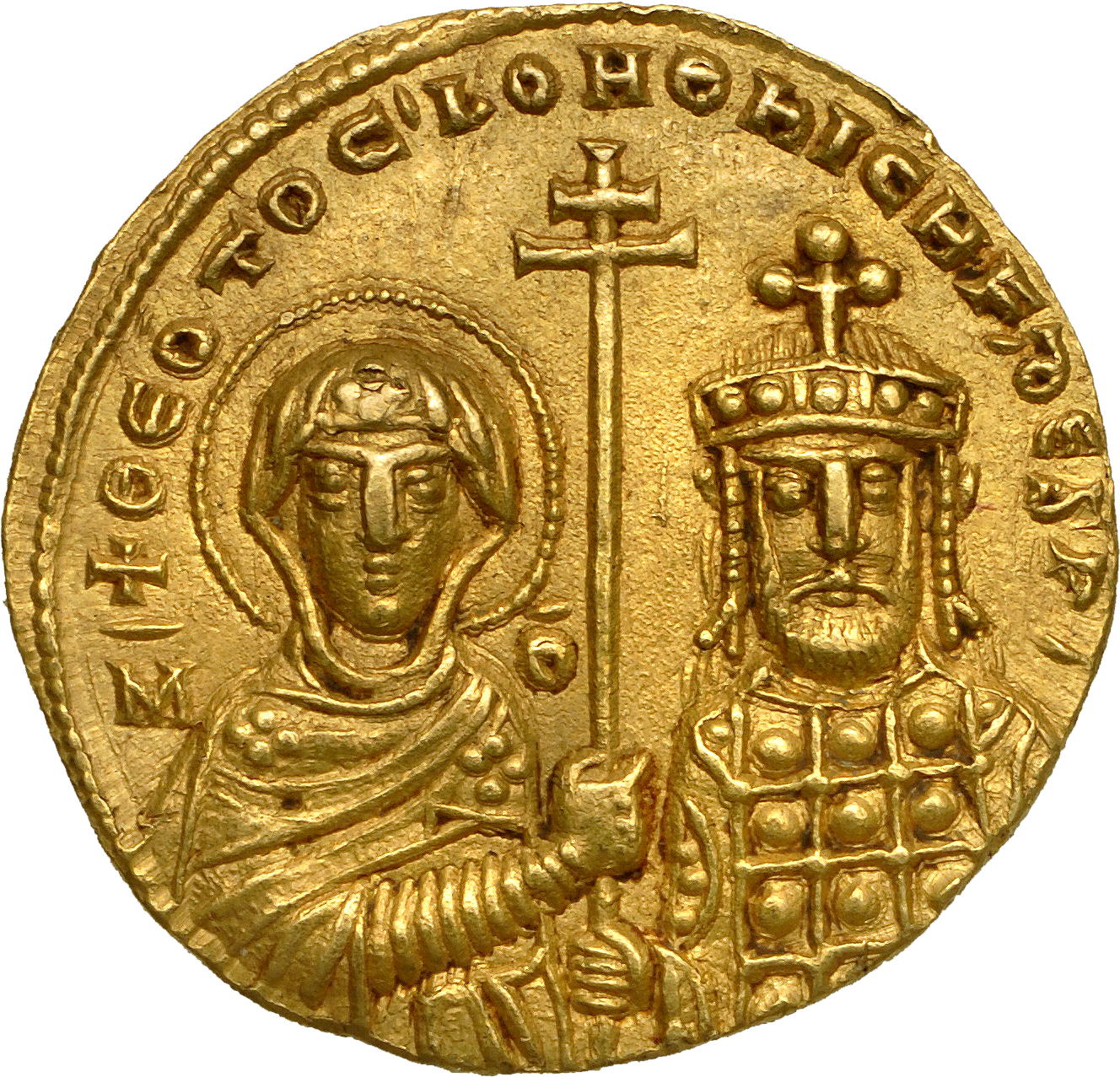
Histamenon of Nikephoros II (right) alongside Mother Mary, 963-969 AD.

=== Hamdanids ===
After the establishment of the Hamdanid state in Aleppo, Saif al-Dawla extended his authority to Baalbek in the year 335 AH / 947 AD. Although Damascus revolted against Sayf al-Dawla, and favored the Ikhshidids when Kafur al-Ikhshidi regained it, Baalbek separated from Damascus, and remained a fortress for Sayf al-Dawla until his death in the year 356 AH / 967 AD. After the death of Saif al-Dawla, the Byzantines invaded it, and plundered it along with all the other Hamdanid cities.

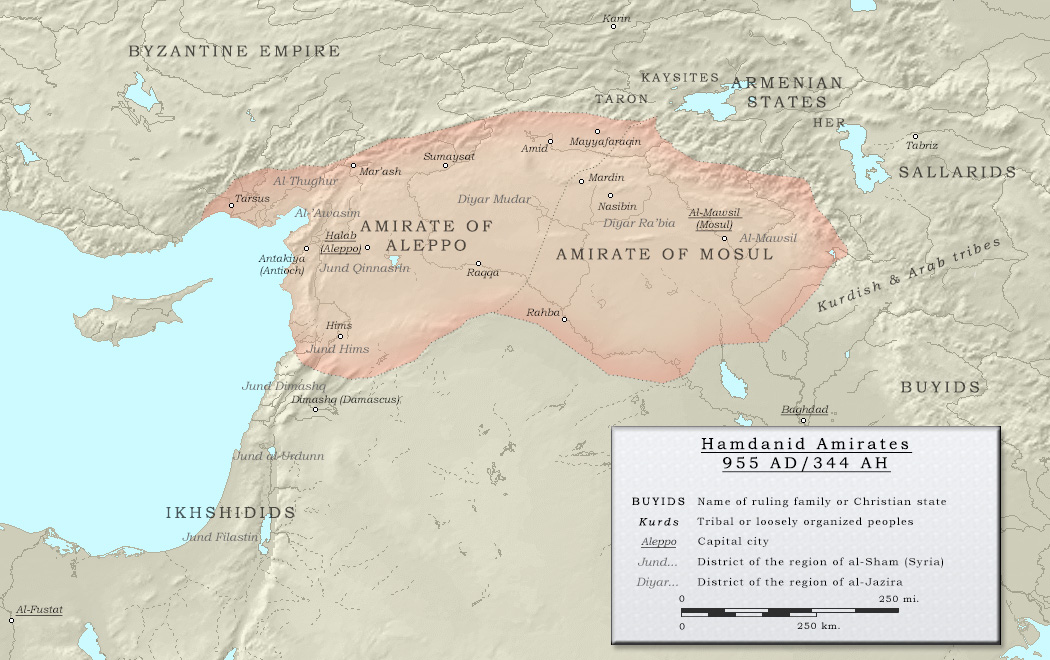
Map of the Hamdanid domains at their greatest extent, ca. 955

=== Fatimids ===
In the year 359 AH / 970 AD, the Fatimid leader (Jawhar) arrived in Damascus and took possession of it and then he went to Baalbek and subjugated it and performed a sermon in it to the Fatimid Caliph Al-Mu’izz after it had been to the Abbasid Al-Muti’. And the call to prayer was made in Hayy 'Ala Khayr al-'Amal (an Adhān formula) and the city followed the deputy of Damascus, Jaafar bin Falah.

=== Anti-Fatimid rebellions ===
In 975, the anti-Fatimid rebel Alptakin resolved to extend his influence over the Bekaa Valley and the coastal Lebanese cities shortly after his occupation of Damascus, so he marched towards Baalbek to fight Zālim Ibn Mawhūb, and succeeded in defeating him. He fled and hid with Prince Tamim bin Al-Mundhir bin Al-Nu`man Al-Arslani, then he wrote to Al-Mu`izz informing him of the situation, so Al-Mu`izz ordered him to reside in Sidon.

Tyrian Revolt

A revolt was led by a sailor named Allaqa took place in Tyre against Fatimid influence and perceived neglect, the rebels drove out the Fatimids for two years until the revolt was suppressed with the help of Hamdanid prince Abu Abdallah al-Husayn in 998, whereby the latter was subsequently assigned as governor of the city and its surroundings.

== Events ==
=== 900s ===
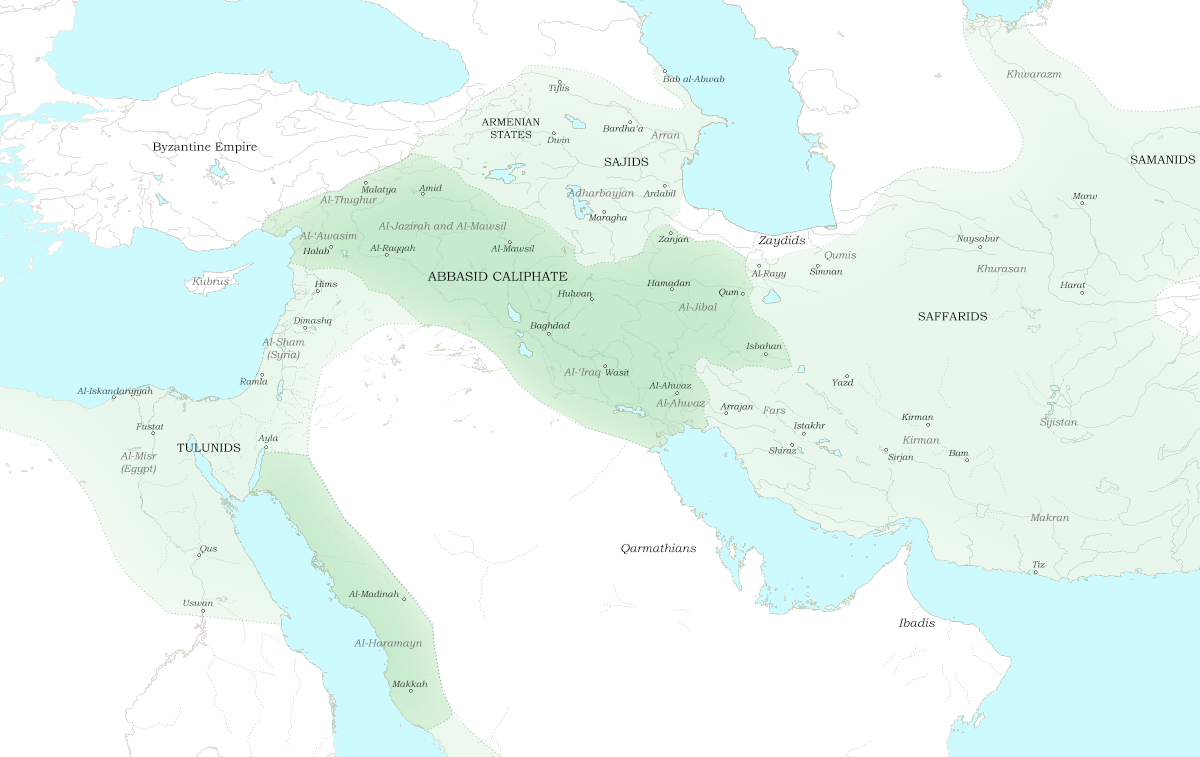
Map showing the result of al-Mu'tadid's campaigns of consolidation, c. 900: areas under direct Abbasid control in dark green, areas under loose Abbasid suzerainty, but under autonomous governors, in light green. Under al-Muktafi, the western provinces of the Levant and Egypt were re-incorporated into the Abbasid empire.

- The Qarmatians appear in the Levant in the year 290 AH / 905 AD, starting a series of massacres and looting of the Lebanese inhabitants.
- Muhammad bin Suleiman crushes the Qarmatian revolution in the year 291 AH / 906 AD, returning Lebanon to the Abbasids.
- The Tyrian Abbasid naval fleet achieves a victory over the Byzantines in the year 296 AH / 908 AD.

=== 930s ===
- Lebanon re-enters the Abbasid caliphate under the Abbasid leader "Muhammad bin Ra'iq" in the year 327 AH / 938 AD.
- Beth Maroun and many Maronite monasteries are completely destroyed. Subsequently, the Maronite Patriach Youhanna the Second leaves Syria to the mountains of Lebanon, 938 AD. Subsequently, the monastery of The Virgin of Ianosh (Anoch) becomes with Maronite Patriarch Yuhanna in the same year the patriarchal seat of the Maronite Church, Yanouh.

=== 940s ===
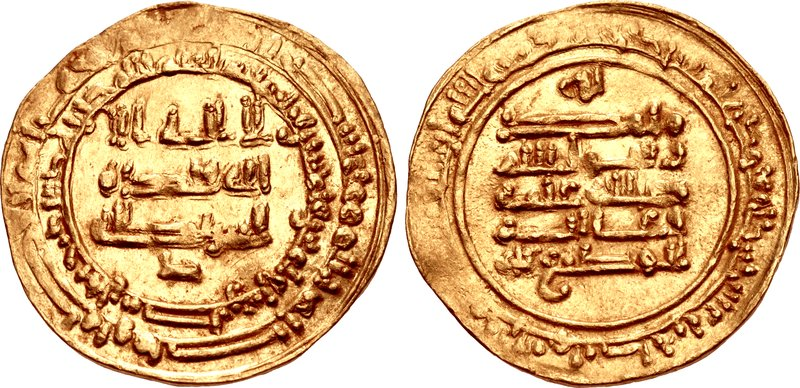
Gold dinar of Kafur minted in 966 in Ramla, Palestine

- Kafur al-Ikhshidi, the mediator between the byzantines and the ikhshidids, sails with sheikh Abu Umair and the Byzantine emperor’s ambassador from Tyre to Tarsus, finishing their diplomatic mission in october, 940 AD.
- Muhammad bin Tughj annexes Lebanon to the Ikhshidid state, 941 AD.
- Beginning of the Shi'a Century, 945 AD.
- The Hamdanid Saif al-Dawla extends his authority to Baalbek in the year 335 AH / 947 AD.

=== 960s ===
- Start of the anti-Ikhshidid revolt of Tripoli, 968 AD.
- After the year 969 AD, the Fatimid state in Egypt succeeds the Ikhshidid state and extend their rule over Lebanon.

=== 970s ===
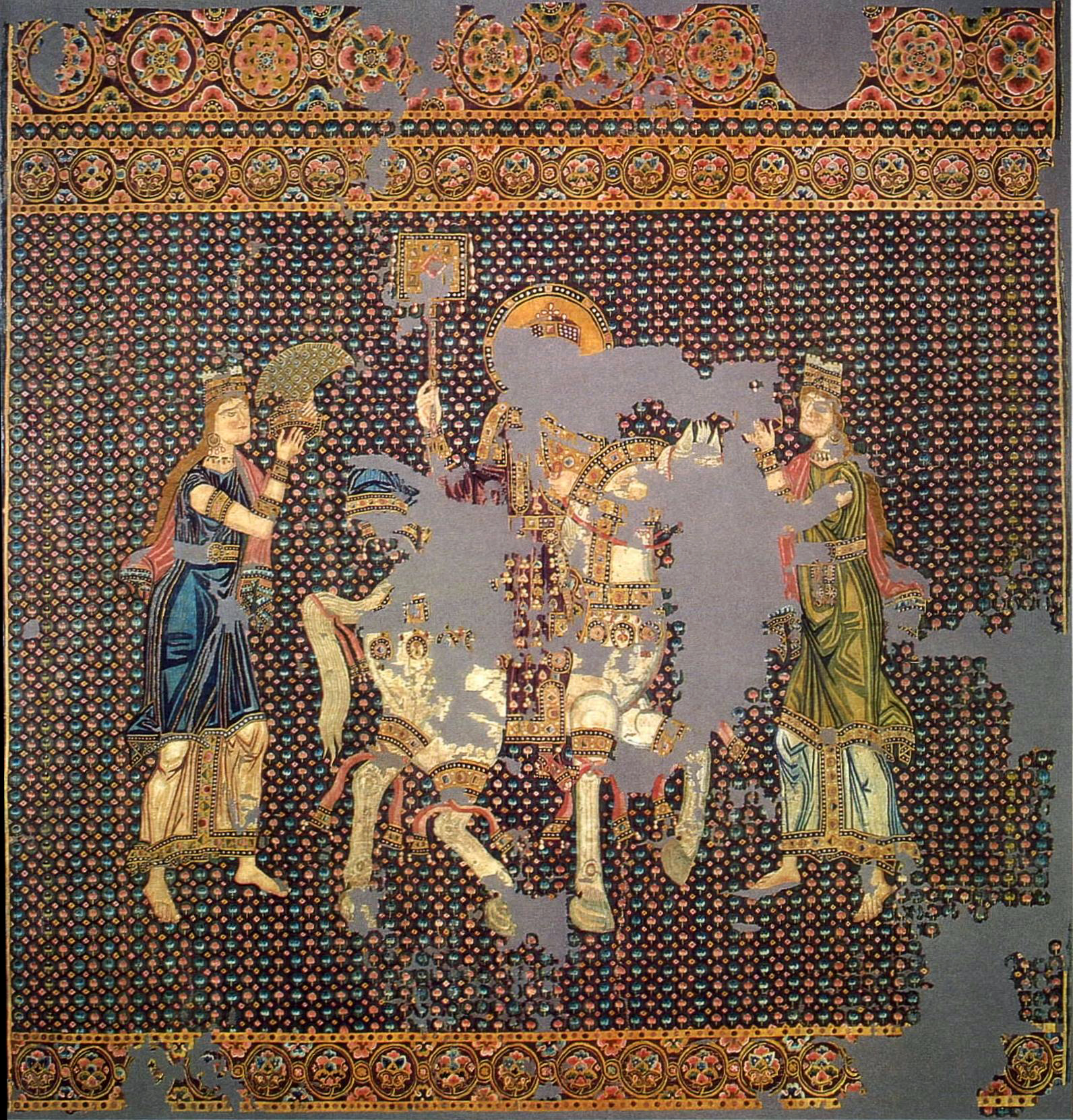
Bamberger Gunthertuch, a Byzantine silk tapestry depicting the return of Tzimiskes from a successful campaign

- The Fatimid military leader Jawhar takes possession of Baalbek, 970 AD.
- In 974, the Byzantine Emperor John I Tzimiskes gains Beirut and stays there for about a year before getting expelled by Egyptian forces.
- In 975, military general and anti-Fatimid rebel al-Aftakin occupies the Bekaa, Sidon, and Baalbek.
- In 975, Tzimiskes's forces take from Aftakin's forces: Baalbek, Sidon, and Beirut, in which he brought with him a wonderworking icon of Christ (the Christ of Beirut) from the era of Athanasius from Beirut to Constantinople. He also invaded Byblos, and Tripoli, but failed to take Jerusalem.

=== 980s ===
- Byzantine general Bardas Phocas leaves Homs in the direction of the Beqaa to reach and invade Tripoli, 983 AD.

=== 990s ===
- Military forces of the Byzantine general Dalassenos raid the environs of Tripoli and Arqa, 996 AD.

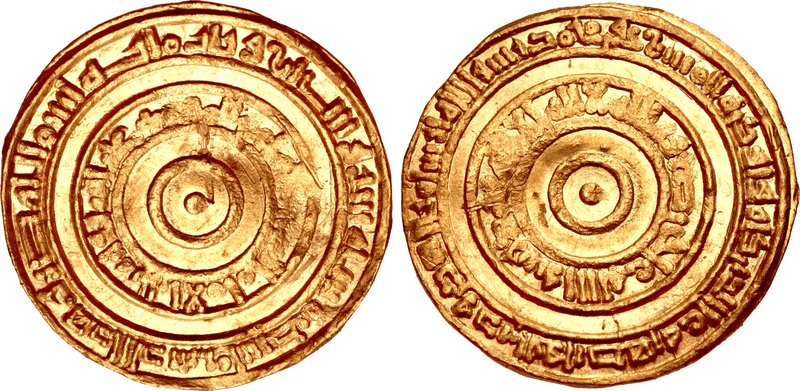
Gold dinar of al-Aziz minted in Palestine in AH 366 (976/977 CE)

- The Revolt of Tyre, an anti-Fatimid rebellion by the populace of the city of Tyre, in modern Lebanon, begins in 996.
- In 996, shortly before al-Aziz's death, Abu Abdallah al-Husayn is appointed governor of Tyre, and is tasked with suppressing the city's revolt.
- General Dalassenos raids Tripoli again, 997 AD.
- Tyre is re-occupied by the Fatimids in May 998 and is plundered with its defenders getting either massacred or taken captive to Egypt, where 'Allaqa, the leader of the revolt, is flayed alive and crucified, while many of his followers, as well as 200 Byzantine captives, get executed.
- Byzantine emperor Basil II leads several raids against Baalbek, Beirut, and Byblos, December of 999. He also led a failed siege against Tripoli in the same month.

== Industry ==
Among the most prominent industries of the Fatimids that spread in Lebanon was the manufacture of brocade clothes and the manufacture of the Tunfusah (طُنْفُسَةٌ). The city of Tyre excelled in making beads and glass and extracting sugar, and Tripoli was famous for making paper for writing. The ports of the Lebanese coast were a popular market for all agricultural and industrial products, as well as a center for their export to the cities of the Mediterranean Basin.

== Architecture ==
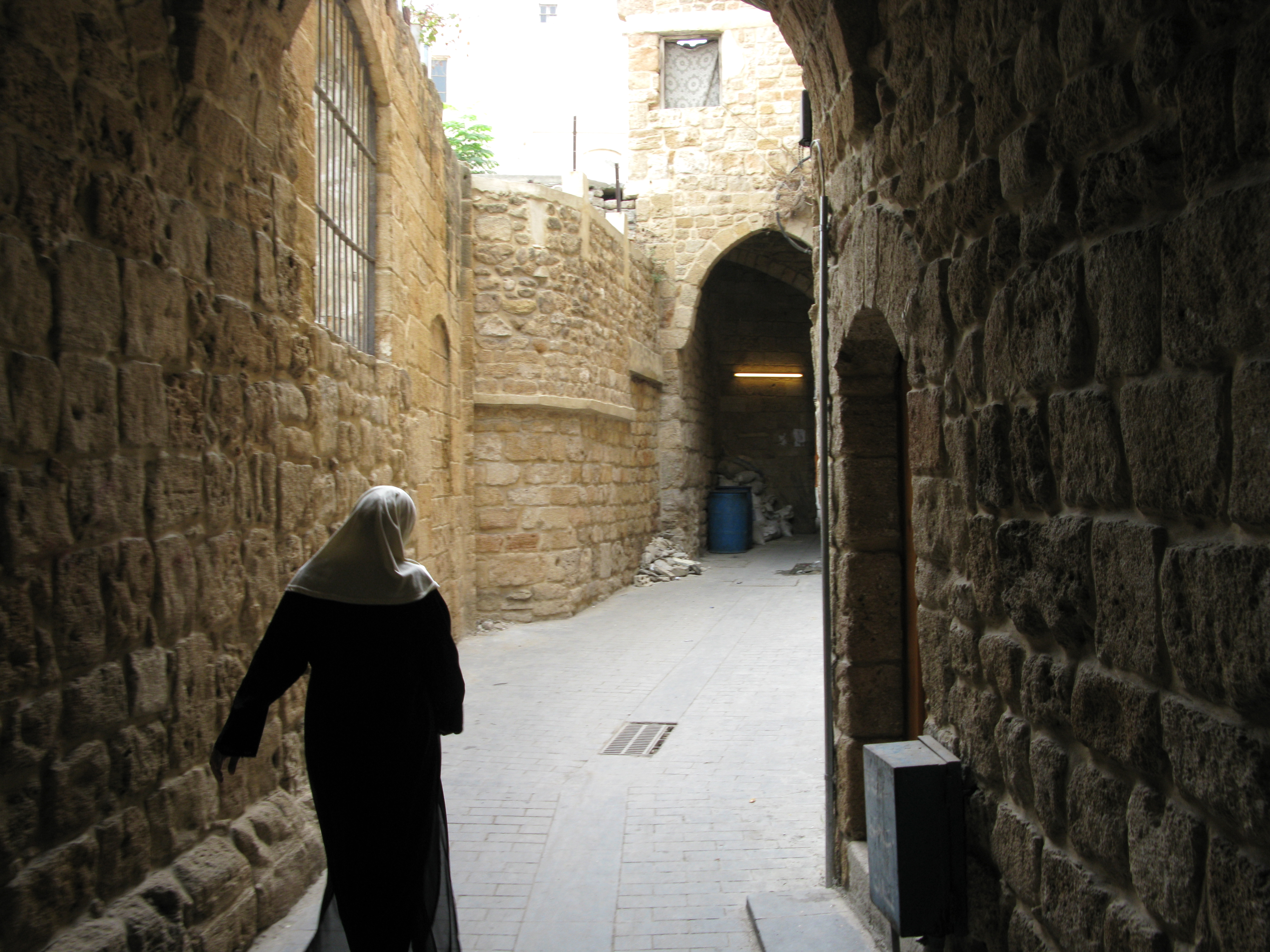
Alleyways of the old city of Sidon.

- "Qalaat Al-Mu’izz", a fortress attributed to the Fatimid Al-Mu'izz li-Din Allah (ruled 341-365 AH / 952-975 AD), old city, Sidon.

== People ==
=== 910s ===
- Qusta ibn Luqa, a Tyrian-born Melkite Christian physician, philosopher, astronomer, mathematician and translator, dies in 912 at the age of 92 years, Bagratid Armenia.
- Ibn Jumay' Al Sidawi (The Sidonian), a 'ālim in the hadith and an expert in Biographical evaluation, is born in Sidon, 917 AD.

=== 950s ===
- Abbasid-era Shi'ite poet Abdul Muhsin the Tyrian is born, 950 AD.

== See also ==
- Druze
- Shi'a Century
- Qarmatians
- Tulunids
- Ikhshidid dynasty
- Hamdanids
- Fatimids

== Sources ==
- Stevenson, William B. (1926). "Chapter VI. Islam in Syria and Egypt (750–1100)". In Bury, John Bagnell (ed.). The Cambridge Medieval History: Contest of Empire and Papacy. Vol. V. New York: The Macmillan Company. pp. 242–264.
- Vasiliev, Alexander A.; Grégoire, Henri; Canard, Marius; Honigmann, Ernst [in German] (1935–1968). Byzance et les Arabes. Corpus Bruxellense Historiae Byzantinae (in French). Vol. 1–3 (in 4 volumes). Brussels: Institut de philologie et d'histoire orientales et slaves & Fondation Byzantine.
- CARTER, Terry & DUNSTON, Lara. Libano, Torino, EDT, 2004. ISBN 88-7063-748-4
- SALIBI, Kamal. A House of Many Mansions: The History of Lebanon Reconsidered, London, I.B. Tauris, 1988. ISBN 0-520-06517-4
- MOURAD, Bariaa. Du Patrimoine à la Muséologie : Conception d'un musée sur le site archéologique de Tyr, Thèse de DEA (études doctorales); Museum National d'Histoire Naturelle (MNHN), Étude réalisée en coopération avec l'Unesco, Secteur de la Culture, Division du Patrimoine Culturel, 1998.
- KHURI, Elias & BEYDOUN, Ahmad. Rappresentare il Mediterraneo. Lo sguardo libanese, Messina, Mesogea, 2006. ISBN 88-469-2021-X
- Canard, Marius (1961). "Les sources arabes de l'histoire byzantine aux confins des Xe et XIe siècles". Revue des études byzantines. 19: 284–314 (297–298). doi:10.3406/rebyz.1961.1264.
- Gil, Moshe (1997) [1983]. A History of Palestine, 634–1099. Translated by Ethel Broido. Cambridge: Cambridge University Press. pp. 369–370. ISBN 0-521-59984-9.
- Schlumberger, Gustave (1900). L'Épopée byzantine à la fin du Xe siècle. Seconde partie, Basile II le tueur de Bulgares (in French). Paris: Hachette et Cie. pp. 107–108.
