= Badr al-Hammami =

Abbasid Provincial governor and Army general

Badr ibn Abdallah al-Hammami بدر بن عبدالله الحمّامي

Governor of Fars
- In office 914–920s
- Monarch: al-Muqtadir

Governor of Sistan
- In office 914–916/17
- Monarch: al-Muqtadir
- Deputy: Fadl ibn Hamid
- Succeeded by: Kathir ibn Ahmad

Personal details
- Died: c. 923 Abbasid Caliphate
- Spouse: unknown
- Children: unknown
- Military career
- Branch: Abbasid army
- Service years: 893–923
- Rank: General
- Awards: Robes of honour from Caliph al-Muktafi in August 905

Badr ibn ʿAbdallāh al-Ḥammāmī (Arabic: بدر بن عبدالله الحمّامي) also known as Badr al-Kabīr ("Badr the Elder"), was a general who served the Tulunids and later the Abbasids.

== Life ==
Of Greek origin, Badr was originally a slave of the founder of the Tulunid regime, Ahmad ibn Tulun, who later set him free. In September 893, along with Abu Ja'far Muhammad ibn Abba, and the governor of Tarsus, Ahmad ibn Tughan al-Ujayfi, Badr led an expedition against the Byzantine Empire, reaching as far as al-Balaqsun (unidentified, possibly Carian or Lycian Telmessos). Following the death of Ibn Tulun's son Khumarawayh in 896, many Tulunid officers left Egypt and defected to the Abbasids. Badr remained behind, and ranked, along with Faik and Safi, as one of the principal commanders; each of them commanding a portion of the army, they were able to force the Tulunid government to hand over the revenue necessary to continue paying their troops, whose total loyalty they thus secured. Consequently, they, and Badr in particular, were among the main rivals of Muhammad ibn Abba, who acted as the regent of the underage emir Harun ibn Khumarawayh.

In 902, he led a relief army from Egypt to confront the Qarmatians under Yahya ibn Zikrawayh (the "Master of the She-camel"), who had attacked Syria in 902 and besieged Tughj ibn Juff in Damascus. The two Tulunid commanders fought with the Qarmatians before the gates of the city and managed to kill the Qarmatian leader, but nevertheless lost the battle. Yahya was succeeded by his brother, Husayn (the "Man with the Mole"), who proceeded to lay waste to much of Syria in 902–903. Sometime before late August 903, however, he scored a big victory against the Qarmatians, killing many and driving the rest into the desert. This event is only known from a dispatch sent to Baghdad, briefly mentioned by al-Tabari. This success was soon followed by the decisive victory of the Abbasid army at the Battle of Hama in November, which led to the capture and execution of Husayn and the senior Qarmatian leaders.

In autumn 904, the Abbasids under Muhammad ibn Sulayman al-Katib launched a campaign to recover Egypt and end the Tulunid regime. When Muhammad arrived at the borders of Egypt in November, Badr went over to him. The defection of the most senior Tulunid commander was soon followed by other Tulunid officers, and when Harun ibn Khumarawayh was murdered by one of his own men, the regime collapsed into anarchy, and Muhammad entered Fustat without opposition. Now in Abbasid service, in August 905 Badr received robes of honour from Caliph al-Muktafi, and was sent as deputy and advisor to another commander, Fatik, to confront the rebellion of a former Tulunid officer, Ibrahim al-Khaliji, who had seized much of the country along with Fustat.

In 914, he was governor of Fars. Following the assassination of the Samanid ruler Ahmad ibn Isma'il and the accession of his underage son, the Samanid regime was weakened. Badr used the opportunity to re-assert Abbasid control over Sistan, sending Fadl ibn Hamid there as his deputy. This success was short-lived, however, and the province soon fell back into the hands of local warlords, until the emergence of Kathir ibn Ahmad as its ruler in 917. In October 917, Badr was placed in command of 5,000 men and sent to pursue the rebel leader Abdalla ibn Ibrahim al-Misma'i and his Kurdish followers near Isbahan.

Badr died in 923.

== Sources ==
- Bosworth, C.E. (1975). "The Ṭāhirids and Ṣaffārids". In Frye, Richard N. (ed.). The Cambridge History of Iran: From the Arab Invasion to the Saljuqs. Vol. 4. Cambridge: Cambridge University Press. pp. 90–135. ISBN 0-521-20093-8.
- Rosenthal, Franz, ed. (1985). The History of al-Ṭabarī, Volume XXXVIII: The Return of the Caliphate to Baghdad: The Caliphates of al-Muʿtaḍid, al-Muktafī and al-Muqtadir, A.D. 892–915/A.H. 279–302. SUNY Series in Near Eastern Studies. Albany, New York: State University of New York Press. ISBN 978-0-87395-876-9.
- Hassan, Zaky M. (1933). Les Tulunides, étude de l'Égypte musulmane à la fin du IXe siècle, 868-905 (in French). University of Paris.
