= Battle of Hama (903) =

903 Abbasid-Qarmatian battle in Syria

Date	29 November 903
Location	near Hama
Result	Decisive Abbasid victory: Elimination of the "Fatimid" Bedouin from the western Syrian Desert; Opening of the way for the reconquest of Tulunid Egypt

Belligerents
Abbasid Caliphate; Banu Shayban; Banu Tamim	"Fatimid" pro-Isma'ili rebels

Commanders and leaders
Muhammad ibn Sulayman al-Katib al-Husayn ibn Hamdan; Ali ibn Aziz al-Din	Yahya ibn Zakarawayh †; Zakarawayh ibn Mihrawayh † almubashir bin al-Nu'man †; Al-Husayn ibn Zakarawayh (executed)

Strength
Unknown	4,900 cavalry 3,000 infantry

Casualties and losses
Unknown	Very heavy; many killed Over 1,100 horses captured

The Battle of Hama was fought some 24 km (15 mi) from the city of Hama in Syria on 29 November 903 between the forces of the Abbasid Caliphate and pro-Isma'ili Bedouin (called "Fatimids" or "Qarmatians"). The Abbasids were victorious, resulting in the capture and execution of the Isma'ili leadership. This removed the Isma'ili presence in northern Syria, and was followed by the suppression of another revolt in Iraq in 906. More importantly, it paved the way for the Abbasid attack on the autonomous Tulunid dynasty and the reincorporation of the Tulunid domains in southern Syria and Egypt into the Abbasid Caliphate.

== Background ==
Map of Syria with its provinces and its major settlements in the 9th/10th centuries

In the second half of the 9th century, the Isma'ili Shi'ite sect began establishing a network of agents and sympathizers across the Muslim world. It was a time of millennialist expectations, coinciding with a deep crisis of the Abbasid Caliphate during the decade-long Anarchy at Samarra, the rise of breakaway and autonomous regimes in the provinces, and the large-scale Zanj Rebellion, whose leader claimed Alid descent and proclaimed himself as the mahdi. In this chaotic atmosphere, and with the Abbasids preoccupied with suppressing the Zanj uprising, the Isma'ili missionaries found fertile ground, aided by dissatisfaction among the adherents of the rival Twelver branch of Shi'a Islam with the political quietism of their leadership and the recent disappearance of their own imam. Missionaries like Hamdan Qarmat and his brother-in-law Abu Muhammad Abdan spread their network of agents to the area around Kufa in the late 870s, and from there to Yemen (Ibn Hawshab, 882) and thence India (884), Bahrayn (Abu Sa'id al-Jannabi, 899), Persia, and Ifriqiya (Abu Abdallah al-Shi'i, 893). In this period, the Isma'ili movement was based at Salamiya on the western edge of the Syrian Desert, and its leadership was assumed by Sa'id ibn al-Husayn, the future founder of the Fatimid Caliphate. Sa'id's claims to be the awaited mahdi instead of Muhammad ibn Isma'il, as had been hitherto assumed, caused a split in the movement in 899. Hamdan denounced the leadership in Salamiya, gathered the Iraqi missionaries and ordered them to cease the missionary effort. Shortly after he disappeared from his headquarters, and Abdan was assassinated at the instigation of Zakarawayh ibn Mihrawayh, who had remained loyal to Salamiya. These events caused a major split in the Isma'ili movement, between those who recognized Sa'id's claims to the imamate and those who rejected them. The latter are generally known by the term "Qarmatians", although this name was also applied by non-Isma'ilis in a pejorative sense to the supporters of the Fatimids.

After his role in the murder of Abdan, Zakarawayh ibn Mihrawayh escaped Iraq and resumed his missionary efforts among the Bedouin tribes of the eastern Syrian Desert, but with little success. He then sent his sons, al-Husayn and Yahya, who became known by the names Sahib al-Shama ("Man with the Mole") and Sahib al-Naqa ("Master of the She-camel"), to proselytize among the large Bedouin tribal confederation of the Banu Kalb, between Palmyra and the Euphrates River. Many Bedouin from the Banu'l-Ullays and Banu'l-Asbagh flocked to them, thus acquiring a potent military force, albeit one with limitations: the Bedouin were more concerned with extracting booty from the settled communities, and were ill-suited to campaigns of conquering and holding territories. Buoyed by their success, the brothers and their followers adopted the name al-Fatimiyyun ("Fatimids") and rose in revolt in 902. The motivations of al-Husayn, Yahya, and their father, who remained in Iraq, have been variously interpreted by modern scholars. Traditionally this movement has been regarded as wholly "Qarmatian" in character, and was called that by the Abbasid government. In recent years, however, the consensus follows the analysis of Heinz Halm, which has shown that Zakarawayh and his sons remained loyal to Sa'id, and that their actions aimed at securing possession of Syria and triggering a general rebellion against the Abbasids. Nevertheless, this uprising was apparently without the knowledge or authorization of Sa'id, and would end up placing him in mortal danger, as it alerted the authorities to the whereabouts of the Isma'ili movement's true leader, who had to flee to Ramla.

From their base in the region around Palmyra, the Fatimid Bedouin began launching raids against the Abbasid and Tulunid provinces of Syria, with devastating effect. In 902, they defeated the Tulunids under Tughj ibn Juff near Raqqa, and laid siege to Damascus for seven months, from December 902 until July 903. The city was successfully held by Tughj and the Sahib al-Naqa was killed. Leadership passed to the Sahib al-Shama, who led his men to ravage Homs, Hama, Ba'albek, and Ma'arrat al-Numan. Based at Salamiya, and in the expectation that his hidden master would come forth, the Bedouin began to establish the institutions of a state: at the mint of Homs, coins were issued in the name of the mahdi, and in the Friday sermon the name of the Abbasid caliph was dropped in favour of the—as yet unnamed—"Successor, the rightly-guided Heir, the Lord of the Age, the Commander of the Faithful, the Mahdi". Encamped at Salamiya, the Bedouin waited for Sa'id's arrival in vain, from August to November 903. Despite al-Husayn's repeated entreaties in his correspondence with his master, however, Sa'id refused to leave the safety of Ramla.

== Battle ==
In view of the apparent impotence of the Tulunid regime to stop the Bedouin raids, the Syrians called upon the Abbasid government to intervene directly, and on 30 July 903, Caliph al-Muktafi commanded that a campaign be undertaken. The campaign was nominally headed by al-Muktafi in person, who left Baghdad on 9 August and went to Raqqa. In mid-August, the Bedouin under a certain al-Mutawwaq surprised an Abbasid army some 10,000 strong near Aleppo, while it was resting and dispersed, with many troops seeking to escape the intense heat in a local river; the Abbasid troops were routed, and only about a thousand managed to reach the city, where, under the command of Abu al-Agharr, they repulsed the Bedouin attacks. At about the same time, however, the general Badr al-Hammami inflicted a heavy defeat on the Sahib al-Shama and his men near Damascus. The Bedouin fled to the desert, and Caliph al-Muktafi sent men under al-Husayn ibn Hamdan to pursue them. While al-Muktafi remained at Raqqa, command of the army in the field was given to the head of the department of the army (diwan al-jund), Muhammad ibn Sulayman al-Katib. On Tuesday, 29 November 903, the Abbasid army under Muhammad met the Fatimids at a location some 24 km from Hama. The course of the battle is described in a victory dispatch sent by Muhammad to the caliph afterwards and included in the History of the Prophets and Kings of al-Tabari.

According to the latter, on the morning of 29 November, the Abbasid army set out from al-Qarwanah towards al-Alyanah—both unidentified locations—deployed in full battle order. During the march, Muhammad ibn Sulayman received a report that a part of the Fatimid army, comprising 3,000 horse and many foot under one of the Isma'ili chief missionaries, al-Nu'man, had encamped at a locality some 12 Arabic miles (about 24 kilometres (15 mi)) from Hama, and that the other detachments of the Bedouin army had joined him there. Muhammad led his army towards the Bedouin encampment, and found them deployed in battle array. According to the report of Muhammad, the Bedouin left wing was led by Masrur al-Ulaymi and others, in charge of 1,500 horsemen. Behind the left wing was placed a reserve force of 400 cavalry. The Bedouin centre was commanded by al-Nu'man al-Ullaysi and other officers, and comprised 1,400 cavalry and 3,000 infantry, while the right wing was commanded by Kulayb al-Ullaysi and others and numbered 1,400 horsemen, with a reserve force of 200 horsemen more.

As the two armies advanced on each other, the Bedouin left thrust forward against the Abbasid right, which was commanded by al-Husayn ibn Hamdan. The troops of Ibn Hamdan repulsed the first Bedouin attack, and then the second, killing 600 horsemen. The Bedouin on the left broke and fled; Ibn Hamdan and his men pursued them and in a series of engagements killed all but 200 of them. Ibn Hamdan's troops reportedly captured 500 horses and 400 silver necklaces as well. The Bedouin right wing likewise attacked the Abbasid left, held by al-Qasim ibn Sima, Yumn al-Khadim, and the tribal allies of Banu Shayban and Banu Tamim. While the two wings were grappling with each other, an Abbasid detachment under Khalifah ibn al-Mubarak and Lu'lu' attacked the Bedouin on their flank and broke their lines. Here too the Bedouin fled pursued by the government forces, who took some 600 horses and 200 necklaces as booty. Several Fatimid commanders, including the missionary al-Nu'man, were killed at the battle.

Muhammad himself confronted the Bedouin centre along with several other officers: Khaqan, Nasr al-Qushuri, and Muhammad ibn Kumushjur led forces from the right flank, Wasf Mushgir, Muhammad ibn Ishaq ibn Kundajiq, Ahmad ibn Kayghalagh and his brother Ibrahim, al-Mubarak al-Qummi, Rabi'a ibn Muhammad, Muhajir ibn Tulayq, al-Muzaffar ibn Hajj, Abdallah ibn Hamdan (al-Husayn's brother), Jinni the Elder, Wasif al-Buktamir, Bishr al-Buktamiri, and Muhammad ibn Qaratughan. With the support of troops from the right wing, who after repelling the Bedouin left flanked their centre, the Abbasids were victorious here as well. The Fatimids broke and were pursued over several miles. Muhammad ibn Sulayman, fearful lest his army disperse itself during the pursuit, or leave the infantry and the baggage train—guarded by Isa ibn Muhammad al-Nushari—exposed to a Bedouin attack, halted the pursuit of his own detachment after half a mile. He set up camp there for the night, and with the Caliph's spear as a rallying point, began regrouping the various squadrons. Despite the overwhelming victory, Muhammad and his officers remained on guard during the night, concerned of a possible Bedouin attack.

== Aftermath ==
The Sahib al-Shama did not take part in the battle, having remained behind at Salamiya along with the treasure he had hoarded there on behalf of his master. Enraged about the apparent abandonment by the supposed divinely-guided imam, the Sahib al-Shama turned against him: his residence at Salamiya was destroyed, and all family members and servants encountered there executed. This atrocity, along with the failure of the uprising, led later Fatimid historians to try and excise Sa'id's relationship with the sons of Zakarawayh in what Halm calls an act of damnatio memoriae. The Sahib al-Shama tried to rouse the chiefs of the Banu'l-Ullays to resistance, but they refused. Left with no other recourse, the Sahib al-Shama, along with his cousin al-Muddathir, his associate al-Muttawaq and a Greek page fled through the desert. By the time they reached the locality of al-Daliyah on the Euphrates Road near al-Rahba, they had run out of supplies. When a servant was sent to buy provisions in the settlement, he aroused the suspicions of the villagers with his strange dress and manner, so that they notified a local official, Abu Khubzah. The latter rode out with an escort, and after interrogating the servant went to the Qarmatians' camp and took them prisoner. They captured the Sahib al-Shama and his companions who were then escorted by Abu Khubzah and the local governor, Ahmad ibn Muhammad ibn Kushmard, to Caliph al-Muktafi in Raqqa, which they entered on 19 December.

Al-Muktafi returned to Baghdad with the senior captives, who were thrown into prison. Muhammad ibn Sulayman remained at Raqqa to scour the countryside and round up the remaining rebels. He too then returned to Baghdad, which he entered in triumph on 2 February 904. Eleven days later, on 13 February, Muhammad and the sahib al-shurta of the capital, Ahmad ibn Muhammad al-Wathiqi, presided over the public execution of the Fatimid leaders and Isma'ili sympathizers rounded up from Kufa and Baghdad.

The Abbasid victory near Hama did not yet fully eradicate the Isma'ili threat. In 906, the Banu Kalb, under Abu Ghanim Nasr, rose up in rebellion, raided the Hawran and Tiberias, and launched a failed attack on Damascus. They then sacked Tiberias and plundered Hit on the Euphrates. Nasr was soon cornered by the caliphal army, however, and killed by the Banu Kalb themselves in exchange for pardon. As a result, the Isma'ili activities shifted east to the Euphrates, where Zakarawayh ibn Mihrawayh (the father of al-Husayn and Yahya) had also rebelled in 906 near Kufa. After leading an unsuccessful attack on Kufa and number of devastating raids on Hajj caravans, he too was killed in early 907 by caliphal troops under Wasif ibn Sawartakin near al-Qadisiyya. With these defeats, the Isma'ili movement virtually ceased to exist in the Syrian Desert, although their counterparts in Bahrayn remained an active threat for several decades to come.

More importantly, the defeat of the Fatimid Bedouin at Hama opened the way for the Abbasids to recover the provinces of southern Syria and Egypt, held by the Tulunids. The Tulunid regime had become enfeebled due to internal strife, rivalries and the defection of senior officers, and the recent failures against the Bedouin. In 904, Muhammad ibn Sulayman led an army into Syria. The campaign met with little opposition; the Tulunid emir Harun ibn Khumarawayh was even assassinated by his uncles, whereupon several senior commanders switched sides. The Abbasids entered the Egyptian capital Fustat in January 905 without a fight, completing the reconquest of the province.

== Sources ==
- Bianquis, Thierry (1998). "Autonomous Egypt from Ibn Ṭūlūn to Kāfūr, 868–969". In Petry, Carl F. (ed.). The Cambridge History of Egypt: Islamic Egypt, 640–1517. Vol. 1. Cambridge: Cambridge University Press. pp. 86–119. ISBN 0-521-47137-0.
- Brett, Michael (2017). The Fatimid Empire. The Edinburgh History of the Islamic Empires. Edinburgh: Edinburgh University Press. ISBN 978-0-7486-4076-8.
- Daftary, Farhad (2007). The Ismāʿı̄lı̄s: Their History and Doctrines (Second ed.). Cambridge: Cambridge University Press. ISBN 978-0-521-61636-2.
- Halm, Heinz (1991). Das Reich des Mahdi: Der Aufstieg der Fatimiden [The Empire of the Mahdi: The Rise of the Fatimids] (in German). Munich: C. H. Beck. ISBN 978-3-406-35497-7.
- Kennedy, Hugh (2004) [1986]. The Prophet and the Age of the Caliphates: The Islamic Near East from the 6th to the 11th Century (Second ed.). Harlow: Longman. ISBN 978-0-582-40525-7.
- Rosenthal, Franz, ed. (1985). The History of al-Ṭabarī, Volume XXXVIII: The Return of the Caliphate to Baghdad: The Caliphates of al-Muʿtaḍid, al-Muktafī and al-Muqtadir, A.D. 892–915/A.H. 279–302. SUNY Series in Near Eastern Studies. Albany, New York: State University of New York Press. ISBN 978-0-87395-876-9.
