= Isa al-Nushari =

Abbasid commander

Isa ibn Muhammad al-Nushari (Arabic: عيسى النشاري) or Isa ibn Musa al-Nushari was an Abbasid commander and governor of Isfahan in 896–900 and of Egypt from 905 to his death in spring 910.

In 896, he was appointed governor of Isfahan, nominally as deputy of the Dulafid Umar ibn Ahmad ibn Abd al-Aziz but in reality as part of Caliph al-Mu'tadid's re-establishment of direct control over the autonomous Dulafid domains in the Jibal. Isa participated in the hunt for the Dulafid Bakr ibn Abd al-Aziz, who led a guerrilla war against the Abbasids. Although driven to flight in a first encounter, in early spring 897 Isa inflicted a major defeat on the Dulafid, destroying his army and looting his camp. Bakr himself barely escaped with a few followers. On 26 January 898, Isa defeated another Dulafid, Abu Layla ibn Abd al-Aziz, near Isfahan. Abu Layla himself was killed in the battle. In July 900, Isa was recalled from Isbahan and appointed sahib al-shurta in Fars. When the Abbasid commander-in-chief, Badr al-Mu'tadidi, fell victim to the machinations of the vizier al-Qasim ibn Ubayd Allah in 902, Isa was among the close associates of Badr who abandoned him and instead sought clemency from the Caliph al-Muktafi.

In the Battle of Hama against the Qarmatians in November 903, Isa commanded the guard of the Abbasid baggage train under the overall leadership of Muhammad ibn Sulayman al-Katib. In the next year, when Muhammad recovered Syria and Egypt from the autonomous Tulunid dynasty, Isa was appointed as governor of Egypt. His tenure in Egypt was troubled from the start: within months, he was forced to abandon Fustat and flee to Alexandria due to a secessionist rebellion under a certain Ibrahim al-Khalanji. He was possibly the same person as a certain Muhammad ibn Ali al-Khalij, who also led a pro-Tulunid revolt at about the same time. Reinforcements arrived from Baghdad, but in late 905 an army under Ahmad ibn Kayghalagh was defeated by the rebel at al-Arish before the rebel was defeated.

Isa died in May 910, and was buried in Jerusalem. He was succeeded by Takin al-Khazari.

== Sources ==
- Bianquis, Thierry (1998). "Autonomous Egypt from Ibn Ṭūlūn to Kāfūr, 868–969". In Petry, Carl F. (ed.). Cambridge History of Egypt, Volume One: Islamic Egypt, 640–1517. Cambridge: Cambridge University Press. pp. 86–119. ISBN 0-521-47137-0.
- Rosenthal, Franz, ed. (1985). The History of al-Ṭabarī, Volume XXXVIII: The Return of the Caliphate to Baghdad. The Caliphates of al-Mu'tadid, al-Muktafi and al-Muqtadir, A.D. 892–915/A.H. 279–302. Albany, New York: State University of New York Press. ISBN 0-87395-876-4.

Preceded by Shayban ibn Ahmad ibn Tulun as autonomous Tulunid emir of Egypt	Abbasid Governor of Egypt; 905–910	Succeeded by Takin al-Khazari
