= Al-Husayn ibn Zakarawayh =

Qarmatian leader (died 904)

- Other names: Sahib al-Shama
- Years active: Early years of the 10th century
- Known for: Qarmatian leader in the Syrian Desert

Al-Husayn ibn Zakarawayh, also known under his assumed name Sahib al-Shama ("Man with the Mole"), was a Qarmatian leader in the Syrian Desert in the early years of the 10th century.

== Biography ==
Husayn was a younger son of the Qarmatian leader Zakarawayh ibn Mihrawayh and a descendant of the seventh Isma'ili imam, Muhammad ibn Isma'il. Husayn followed his brother Yahya, who claimed to be the Mahdi and assumed the name of "Master of the She-camel", in establishing a base of operations at Palmyra. The brothers were successful in gaining the support of many local Bedouin—especially from the Banu Kalb, thus acquiring a potent military force.

From there they began launching raids against the Abbasid and Tulunid provinces of Syria, with devastating effect. In 902, the Qarmatians defeated the Tulunids under Tughj ibn Juff near Raqqa, and laid siege to Damascus. The city was successfully held by Tughj, and Yahya was killed. Husayn succeeded him as leader, likewise claiming to be the Mahdi under the name of "Abu'l-Abbas Ahmad ibn Abdallah", and with the title of "Sahib al-Shama" ("Man with the Mole/Birthmark"). He led the Qarmatians on to ravage Homs, Hama, Ba'albek, Ma'arrat al-Numan and even their old base at Salamiyah, from where their rival Fatimid Mahdi, Abdallah, had recently departed heading west to the Maghreb.

The Qarmatians' unchecked depredations forced the Abbasid government under Caliph al-Muktafi to intervene directly to combat them; on 29 November 903, an army under Muhammad ibn Sulayman al-Katib met and inflicted a decisive defeat on Husayn's forces at the Battle of Hama. Husayn managed to escape along with his cousin al-Muddathir, his associate al-Muttawaq and a Greek page. They fled through the desert, trying to reach Kufa. They were captured at the locality of al-Daliyah on the Euphrates Road near al-Rahbah, however, and were executed publicly at Baghdad along with other Qarmatian leaders and sympathizers on 13 February 904.

Zakarawayh, the brothers' father, also rebelled in 906 near Kufa but was killed in the next year during an attack on the hajj caravan. With these defeats, the Qarmatian movement virtually ceased to exist in the Syrian Desert, although their counterparts in Bahrayn remained an active threat for several decades to come.

== Sources ==
- Brett, Michael (2001). The Rise of the Fatimids: The World of the Mediterranean and the Middle East in the Fourth Century of the Hijra, Tenth Century CE. The Medieval Mediterranean. Vol. 30. Leiden: BRILL. ISBN 9004117415.
- Daftary, Farhad (1990). The Ismāʿı̄lı̄s: Their History and Doctrines. Cambridge: Cambridge University Press. ISBN 978-0-521-37019-6.
- Halm, Heinz (1991). Das Reich des Mahdi: Der Aufstieg der Fatimiden [The Empire of the Mahdi: The Rise of the Fatimids] (in German). Munich: C. H. Beck. ISBN 3-406-35497-1.
- Kennedy, Hugh (2004). The Prophet and the Age of the Caliphates: The Islamic Near East from the 6th to the 11th Century (Second ed.). Harlow: Longman. ISBN 978-0-582-40525-7.
- Rosenthal, Franz, ed. (1985). The History of al-Ṭabarī, Volume XXXVIII: The Return of the Caliphate to Baghdad: The Caliphates of al-Muʿtaḍid, al-Muktafī and al-Muqtadir, A.D. 892–915/A.H. 279–302. SUNY Series in Near Eastern Studies. Albany, New York: State University of New York Press. ISBN 978-0-87395-876-9.
