= Muhammad ibn Sulayman al-Katib =

Abbasid official and army Commander (890s–905)

Muhammad ibn Sulayman محمد بن سليمان Al-Katib
- Died: after 905; Abbasid Caliphate
- Children: unknown
- Military career
- Allegiance: Abbasid Caliphate
- Branch: Abbasid army
- Service years: 896 – 905
- Rank: Commander
- Conflicts: Battles against Qarmatians; Battle of Hama
- Awards: Robe of honour from Caliph al-Muktafi in 19 May 904

Muhammad ibn Sulayman (Arabic: محمد بن سليمان), surnamed al-Katib, was a senior official and commander of the Abbasid Caliphate, most notable for his victories against the Qarmatians and for his reconquest of Syria and Egypt from the autonomous Tulunid dynasty.

== Life and career ==
An Egyptian himself, he was born and raised in Egypt. As his surname al-katib ("the secretary") indicates, he was originally a secretary of the Egyptian Tulunid general Lu'lu', who from Raqqa ruled over northern Syria on behalf of the autonomous emir of Egypt, Ahmad ibn Tulun. When Lu'lu defected to the Abbasid regent al-Muwaffaq in 882, Muhammad followed his master and became a secretary in the central caliphal administration. He is next mentioned by al-Tabari in 891, as secretary to the vizier Abu'l-Saqr Isma'il ibn Bulbul. The latter supported an abortive attempt to depose al-Muwaffaq and restore power to Caliph al-Mu'tamid, but the reaction of the populace of Baghdad and the army thwarted this. In the resulting riots, Muhammad's house was burned down by the mob.

Nevertheless, in 896 he was an army commander, and entrusted with enrolling the many officers who had defected from the Tulunids for plotting to kill the new Tulunid emir, Jaysh ibn Khumarawayh. In 903, he was head of the department of the army (diwan al-jaysh) and entrusted with the fight against the Qarmatians. The latter were a radical Isma'ili sect founded in Kufa around 874. Originally a sporadic and minor nuisance in the Sawad, their power grew swiftly to alarming proportions after 897, when they began a series of uprisings against the Abbasids. Under the leadership of Abu Sa'id al-Jannabi, they seized Bahrayn in 899 and in the next year defeated a caliphal army under al-Abbas ibn Amr al-Ghanawi. Another base was established in the area around Palmyra by the missionaries Yahya ibn Zikrawayh, also known by the name Sahib al-Naqa ("Master of the She-camel") and al-Husayn, probably Yahya's brother, who took the name Sahib al-Shama ("Man with the Mole"). From their bases in Bahrayn and the Syrian Desert, they struck out against the urban centres of the Abbasid and Tulunid provinces, going as far as to besiege Damascus and ravage the provinces of Syria. The Tulunid army seemed unable to stop them, and the Abbasid government resolved to intervene directly. The campaign was nominally headed by Caliph al-Muktafi in person, but he remained at Raqqa while Muhammad led the army in the field. On 29 November 903, the Abbasid army under Muhammad met the Qarmatians at a location some 24 km from Hamah, and inflicted a crushing defeat upon them. The Qarmatian army scattered and was pursued by the Abbasid troops; the Sahib al-Shama and the other Qarmatian leaders were captured. Al-Muktafi returned to Baghdad, while Muhammad remained at Raqqa to scour the countryside and round up the remaining rebels. He then proceeded to Baghdad, which he entered in triumph on 2 February 904. Eleven days later, he presided over the public execution of the Qarmatian leaders along with the sahib al-shurta of the capital, Ahmad ibn Muhammad al-Wathiqi. At a ceremony on 19 May, he was again rewarded by the Caliph with a robe of honour, along with the senior army leaders. Five days after this ceremony, Muhammad again left the capital at the head of an army, numbering 10,000 according to al-Tabari, and tasked with recovering southern Syria and Egypt itself from the Tulunids.

His campaign was to be assisted from the sea by a fleet from the frontier districts of Cilicia under Damian of Tarsus. Damian led a fleet up the river Nile, raided its coasts, and prevented supplies for the Tulunid forces from being ferried over it. The Tulunid regime had already been weakened by internal strife and the rivalries of the various ethnic groups in the army, which led to the defection of Badr al-Hammami and other senior officers to the Abbasids; the regime was further weakened by the destructive raids of the Qarmatians and its inability to deal with them. The Abbasid advance was mostly unopposed, and in December, emir Harun ibn Khumarawayh was murdered by his uncles Ali and Shayban. Shayban took over the reins of the state, but the murder caused further defections to the Abbasids, including the governor of Damascus, Tughj ibn Juff. In January, the Abbasid army arrived before Fustat. Shayban abandoned his troops during the night, and the Tulunid capital surrendered. The victorious Abbasids razed the Tulunid-founded capital al-Qata'i to the ground, with the exception of the great Mosque of Ibn Tulun. The members of the Tulunid family and their leading adherents were arrested and deported to Baghdad, while their properties were confiscated.

Muhammad left Egypt to the new governor, Isa al-Nushari, and returned to Syria, where he was arrested soon after for embezzling much of the booty from the conquest.

== See also ==
10th century in Lebanon § The Abbasids

== Sources ==
- Bianquis, Thierry (1998). "Autonomous Egypt from Ibn Ṭūlūn to Kāfūr, 868–969". In Petry, Carl F. (ed.). The Cambridge History of Egypt: Islamic Egypt, 640–1517. Vol. 1. Cambridge: Cambridge University Press. pp. 86–119. ISBN 0-521-47137-0.
- Fields, Philip M., ed. (1987). The History of al-Ṭabarī, Volume XXXVII: The ʿAbbāsid Recovery: The War Against the Zanj Ends, A.D. 879–893/A.H. 266–279. SUNY Series in Near Eastern Studies. Albany, New York: State University of New York Press. ISBN 978-0-88706-054-0.
- Kennedy, Hugh (2004) [1986]. The Prophet and the Age of the Caliphates: The Islamic Near East from the 6th to the 11th Century (Second ed.). Harlow: Longman. ISBN 978-0-582-40525-7.
- Rosenthal, Franz, ed. (1985). The History of al-Ṭabarī, Volume XXXVIII: The Return of the Caliphate to Baghdad: The Caliphates of al-Muʿtaḍid, al-Muktafī and al-Muqtadir, A.D. 892–915/A.H. 279–302. SUNY Series in Near Eastern Studies. Albany, New York: State University of New York Press. ISBN 978-0-87395-876-9.
