= Ahmad ibn Kayghalagh =

10th-century Abbasid general and governor of Syria and Egypt

Ahmad ibn Kayghalagh (Arabic: أحمد بن كيغلغ) was an Abbasid military officer who served as governor in Syria and Egypt. He was ousted as governor of Egypt by Muhammad ibn Tughj in 935.

== Life ==
In November 903 he participated in the victorious Battle of Hama against the Qarmatians along with his brother, Ibrahim, under the command of Muhammad ibn Sulayman al-Katib, for which the two brothers, as well as the other officers of the army, received robes of honour from Caliph al-Muktafi on 22 May 904.

After the Abbasids recovered Syria and Egypt from the Tulunids in 904–905, Ibn Kayghalagh was named governor of the provinces of Damascus and Jordan. Soon however he was sent to confront the pro-Tulunid rebellion of Muhammad ibn Ali al-Khalanji. The latter had managed to capture Fustat and proclaim the restoration of the Tulunids, while the local Abbasid commander withdrew to Alexandria. Al-Khalanji proved victorious in the first encounter with Ibn Kayghalagh at al-Arish in December 905, but in the end he was defeated and captured in May 906 and brought to Baghdad. In Ibn Kayghalagh's absence, the Qarmatians raided Jordan and defeated and killed Ibn Kayghalagh's deputy Yusuf ibn Ibrahim ibn Bughamardi, withdrawing only at the approach of reinforcements from Baghdad under al-Husayn ibn Hamdan.

On 22 October 906, he led the annual raid against the Byzantine Empire from Tarsus, joined by the local governor, Rustam ibn Baradu. According to al-Tabari, they defeated the Byzantines at "Salandu" and reached as far as the Halys River, taking 4,000 or 5,000 captives and many horses and cattle as loot. In addition, one of the local Byzantine commanders reportedly surrendered himself and converted to Islam.

Following the rebellion of the Hamdanid Husayn ibn Hamdan in 914/5, Ibn Kayghalagh was one of the commanders assigned to the campaign to subdue Husayn and restore order in the Jazira. Husayn, however, met and defeated the caliphal army, which was forced to withdraw, and he continued to remain aloof of the government until he was captured by the general Mu'nis al-Muzaffar.

In July 923, Ibn Kayghalagh was appointed governor of Egypt, but soon faced a revolt from the troops of the garrison, who had been left unpaid, and was replaced by Takin al-Khazari in April 924. Four years later he was dispatched to Qasr ibn Hubayra following a Qarmatian attack on the town, but by the time he arrived the Qarmatians had withdrawn, and the army returned to Baghdad without engaging them. In 931 he was serving as governor of Isfahan when it was attacked by the Dailamite Lashkari, who defeated Ibn Kayghalagh and occupied the city. Ibn Kayghalagh reportedly saved the situation, however, by engaging the rebel leader in single combat and killing him, whereupon Lashkari's followers fled and the city was retaken.

In March 933 Takin died in Egypt, but his son and designated successor, Muhammad, failed to establish his authority in the province. The governor of Damascus, Muhammad ibn Tughj, was named as the new governor in August but the appointment was revoked a month later, before he could reach Egypt. Ibn Kayghalagh was re-appointed in his place, while a eunuch called Bushri was sent to replace Ibn Tughj in Damascus as well. Ibn Tughj resisted his replacement, and defeated and took Bushri prisoner. The Caliph then charged Ibn Kayghalagh with forcing Ibn Tughj to surrender, but although the former marched against Ibn Tughj, both avoided a direct confrontation. Instead the two men met and reached an agreement of mutual support, upholding the status quo.

Ahmad ibn Kayghalagh soon proved incapable of restoring order to the increasingly turbulent Egypt. By 935, the troops were rioting over lack of pay, and Bedouin raids had recommenced. At the same time, Takin's son Muhammad and the fiscal administrator Abu Bakr Muhammad ibn Ali al-Madhara'i undermined Ibn Kayghalagh and coveted his position. Infighting broke out among the troops between the Easterners (Mashariqa), chiefly Turkish soldiers, who supported Muhammad ibn Takin, and the Westerners (Maghariba), probably Berbers and Black Africans, who backed Ibn Kayghalagh. Backed by powerful factions in Baghdad, Ibn Tughj was once more named governor of Egypt. Taking no chances, Ibn Tughj organized an invasion of the country by land and sea. Although Ibn Kayghalagh was able to delay the advance of Ibn Tughj's army, the latter's fleet took Tinnis and the Nile Delta and moved on to the capital Fustat. Outmanoeuvred and defeated in battle, Ahmad ibn Kayghalagh fled to the Fatimids. The victorious Muhammad ibn Tughj entered Fustat on 26 August 935. Nothing further is known of Ibn Kayghalagh after that, except for a brief mention of him in 936.

== Sources ==
- Margoliouth, D.S., ed. (1921). The Concluding Portion of the Experience of Nations, by Miskawaihi, Vol. I: Reigns of Muqtadir, Qahir and Radi. London: Oxford.
- Bacharach, Jere L. (1975). "The Career of Muḥammad Ibn Ṭughj Al-Ikhshīd, a Tenth-Century Governor of Egypt". Speculum. 50 (4). Medieval Academy of America: 586–612. doi:10.2307/2855469. ISSN 0038-7134. JSTOR 2855469.
- Bianquis, Thierry (1998). "Autonomous Egypt from Ibn Ṭūlūn to Kāfūr, 868–969". In Petry, Carl F. (ed.). The Cambridge History of Egypt: Islamic Egypt, 640–1517. Vol. 1. Cambridge: Cambridge University Press. pp. 86–119. ISBN 0-521-47137-0.
- Brett, Michael (2001). The Rise of the Fatimids: The World of the Mediterranean and the Middle East in the Fourth Century of the Hijra, Tenth Century CE. The Medieval Mediterranean. Vol. 30. Leiden: BRILL. ISBN 9004117415.
- Gil, Moshe (1997) [1983]. A History of Palestine, 634–1099. Translated by Ethel Broido. Cambridge: Cambridge University Press. ISBN 0-521-59984-9.
- Rosenthal, Franz, ed. (1985). The History of al-Ṭabarī, Volume XXXVIII: The Return of the Caliphate to Baghdad: The Caliphates of al-Muʿtaḍid, al-Muktafī and al-Muqtadir, A.D. 892–915/A.H. 279–302. SUNY Series in Near Eastern Studies. Albany, New York: State University of New York Press. ISBN 978-0-87395-876-9.

Preceded by Abu'l-Hasan Hilal ibn Badr	Abbasid Governor of Egypt; 923–924	Succeeded by Takin al-Khazari
Preceded by Muhammad ibn Tughj	Abbasid Governor of Egypt; 933–935	Succeeded by Muhammad ibn Tughj
