= Al-Muktafi =

17th Abbasid Caliph (r. 902–908)

al-Muktafi
- Khalifah; Amir al-Mu'minin
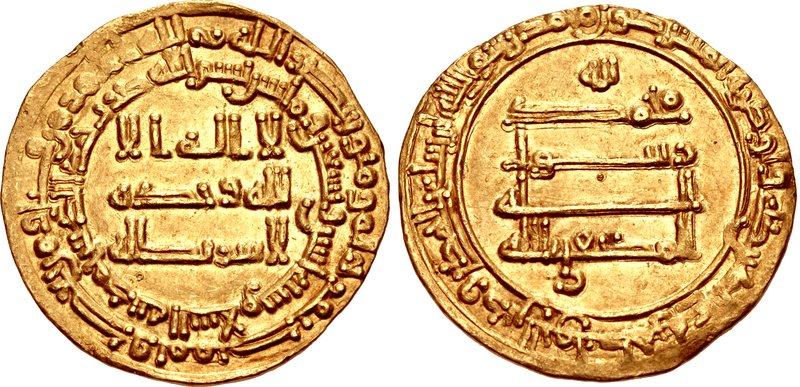
- Gold dinar of al-Muktafi, minted at Baghdad in 904/5

17th Caliph of the Abbasid Caliphate
- Reign: 5 April 902 – 13 August 908
- Predecessor: al-Mu'tadid
- Successor: al-Muqtadir
- Born: c. 877/8; Abbasid Caliphate
- Died: 13 August 908 (aged 31); Baghdad, Abbasid Caliphate
- Burial: Baghdad
- Consort: Bint Khumarawayh; Ghusn
- Issue: Abdallah al-Mustakfi; Abu Ahmad Muhammad; Abbas; Abu al-Fadl; Al-Hassan; Asma; Amat al-Wahid
Names
- Abū Muḥammad ʿAlī ibn Aḥmad ibn Ṭalḥa ibn Jaʿfar ibn Muḥammad ibn Hārūn al-Muktafī bi'Llāh
- Dynasty: Abbasid
- Father: al-Mu'tadid
- Mother: Jijak
- Religion: Sunni Islam

Abū Muḥammad ʿAlī ibn Aḥmad ibn Ṭalḥa ibn Jaʿfar ibn Muḥammad ibn Hārūn al-Muktafī bi'Llāh (Arabic: أبو محمد علي بن أحمد; 877/78 – 13 August 908), better known by his regnal name al-Muktafī bi-Llāh (Arabic: المكتفي بالله, lit. 'Content with God Alone'), was the caliph of the Abbasid Caliphate from 902 to 908. More liberal and sedentary than his militaristic father al-Mu'tadid, al-Muktafi essentially continued his policies, although most of the actual conduct of government was left to his viziers and officials. His reign saw the defeat of the Qarmatians of the Syrian Desert, and the reincorporation of Egypt and the parts of Syria ruled by the Tulunid dynasty. The war with the Byzantine Empire continued with alternating success, although the Arabs scored a major victory in the Sack of Thessalonica in 904. His death in 908 opened the way for the installation of a weak ruler, al-Muqtadir, by the palace bureaucracy, and began the terminal decline of the Abbasid Caliphate that ended in 946 with the caliphs becoming puppet rulers under the Buyid dynasty.

== Early life ==
Ali ibn Ahmad was born in 877/8, the son of Ahmad ibn Talha, the future caliph al-Mu'tadid (r. 892–902) by a Turkish slave-girl, named Čiček ("flower", Jijak in Arabic). He was the first caliph named after caliph Ali.

At the time of his birth, the Abbasid Caliphate was still reeling from the decade-long civil war known as the "Anarchy at Samarra", which had begun with the assassination of Caliph al-Mutawakkil (r. 847–861) by dissatisfied soldiers and ended with the accession of al-Mu'tamid (r. 870–892). Real power, however, lay with al-Mu'tamid's brother, al-Muwaffaq, Ali's paternal grandfather. Al-Muwaffaq enjoyed the loyalty of the military, and by 877 had established himself as the de facto ruler of the state. Caliphal authority in the provinces collapsed during the "Anarchy at Samarra", with the result that by the 870s the central government had lost effective control over most of the Caliphate outside the metropolitan region of Iraq. In the west, Egypt had fallen under the control of Ahmad ibn Tulun, who also disputed control of Syria with al-Muwaffaq, while Khurasan and most of the Islamic East had been taken over by the Saffarids, who replaced Abbasids' loyal clients, the Tahirids. Most of the Arabian peninsula was likewise lost to local potentates, while in Tabaristan a radical Zaydi Shi'a dynasty took power. In Iraq, the rebellion of the Zanj slaves threatened Baghdad itself, and it took al-Muwaffaq and al-Mu'tadid years of hard campaigning before they were finally subdued in 893.

Following his rise to the throne, al-Mu'tadid continued his father's policies, and restored caliphal authority in the Jazira, northern Syria, and parts of western Iran. He established an effective administration, but the incessant campaigning, and the need to keep the soldiery satisfied, meant that it was almost totally geared towards providing the funds necessary to maintain the army. Nevertheless, al-Mu'tadid managed to accumulate a considerable surplus in his ten-year reign. At the same time the bureaucracy grew in power, it also saw a growth in factionalism, with two rival "clans" emerging, the Banu'l-Furat and the Banu'l-Jarrah. The two groups represented primarily different factions in a struggle for office and power, but there are indications of "ideological" differences as well: many of the Banu'l-Jarrah families hailed from converted Nestorian families and employed Christians in the bureaucracy, in addition to maintaining closer ties with the military, while the Banu'l-Furat tried to impose firm civilian control of the army and (not quite openly) favoured Shi'ism.

Al-Mu'tadid took care to prepare Ali, his oldest son and heir-apparent, for the succession by appointing him as a provincial governor: first in Rayy, Qazvin, Qum and Hamadan, when these provinces were seized from the semi-autonomous Dulafid dynasty in c. 894/5, and in 899 over the Jazira and the Byzantine frontier areas, when al-Mu'tadid deposed the last local autonomous governor, Muhammad ibn Ahmad al-Shaybani. The future al-Muktafi took up residence at Raqqa. The religious scholar Ibn Abi al-Dunya, who enjoyed al-Mu'tadid's confidence, was appointed as Ali's tutor.

== Caliphate ==
When al-Mu'tadid died on 5 April 902, al-Muktafi succeeded him unopposed. His father's vizier, al-Qasim ibn Ubayd Allah, ordered the oath of allegiance to be taken in his name, and took the precaution of locking up all Abbasid princes until al-Muktafi arrived in Baghdad from Raqqa (20 April).

=== Character and government ===
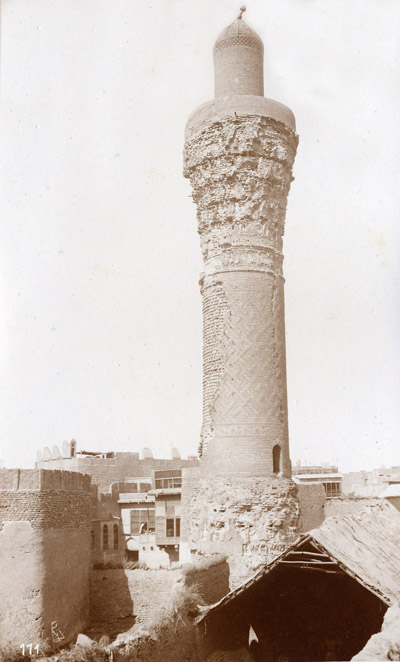
The minaret of al-Muktafi's palace mosque in the early 20th century; the minaret probably dates to an 11th-century reconstruction, while the rest of the mosque was destroyed during the Mongol Sack of Baghdad in 1258

The new caliph was 25 years old on his accession. The historian al-Tabari, who lived during his reign, describes him as of "medium size, handsome, of a delicate complexion, with [a full head of] beautiful hair and a luxurious beard".

Al-Muktafi inherited his father's love of buildings. He completed al-Mu'tadid's third palace project, the Taj ('Crown') Palace, in Baghdad, for which he reused bricks from the palace of the Sasanian rulers in Ctesiphon. Among its numerous buildings was a semicircular tower, known as the 'Cupola of the Ass' (Hubbat al-Himar). The caliph could ride to its top mounted on a donkey, and from there gaze on the surrounding countryside. On the site of his father's palace prisons, he also added a Friday mosque to the palace, the Jami al-Qasr ('Palace Mosque'), now occupied by the Jami al-Khulafa. He also emulated his father in avarice and parsimony, which allowed him to leave, despite a short reign with almost continuous warfare, a considerable surplus. (Note: Various sources record different amounts on the surplus. Al-Tabari gives 15 million gold dinars, in what is obviously a later addition to the text; later authors, like Mas'udi and Ibn al-Zubayr, give smaller sums: 8 million dinars, or 25 million silver dirhams. The larger sums are considered suspect, as they are probably included more as points of criticism on al-Muqtadir, who squandered it, rather than accurate accounts.) When al-Muktafi left Baghdad in May 903 and went to the old capital of Samarra, with the intention of moving his seat there, he was quickly dissuaded by the high cost the rebuilding of the city would entail. His easy-going nature, on the other hand, was the antithesis of his father, who was famous for his extreme severity and the cruel and imaginative punishments he inflicted. Al-Muktafi's popularity received a major boostr when, soon after his accession, he destroyed his father's underground prisons and gave the site to the people, released prisoners and returned lands confiscated by the government. He is also notable for personally attending the sessions of the dīwān al-maẓālim, where he heard the complaints and petitions of the common people.

=== Role of the vizier al-Qasim ===
Al-Muktafi was not as steadfast as his father, and was easily swayed by the officials at court. The early period of his caliphate was dominated by the vizier al-Qasim ibn Ubayd Allah. A very able man, he was also ambitious; he had plotted to assassinate al-Mu'tadid shortly before the latter's death, and now ruthlessly eliminated any rivals for influence over the new caliph.

Thus al-Qasim ordered the execution of the imprisoned Saffarid ruler, Amr ibn al-Layth, when al-Muktafi, immediately after his arrival in Baghdad, asked after his well-being and indicated that he wanted to treat him well. Shortly after, the vizier managed to discredit al-Mu'tadid's loyal commander-in-chief, Badr al-Mu'tadidi. Badr was forced to flee Baghdad but surrendered after being promised a pardon by the vizier's agents, only to be executed on 14 August. A few days later, al-Qasim ordered the arrest of an uncle of the Caliph, Abd al-Wahid, a son of al-Muwaffaq, who never heard from again; and in September 903, al-Husayn ibn Amr al-Nasrani, a Christian secretary, whom al-Muktafi initially favoured and who opposed al-Qasim, was denounced and exiled, his offices being given to al-Qasim's sons, al-Husayn and Muhammad. Al-Qasim even succeeded in having his little daughter betrothed to al-Muktafi's infant son Abu Ahmad Muhammad in March 904, and his eminent position in the state was highlighted by the award, for the first time in the Islamic world, of a special honorific title, Wali al-Dawla.

In the bureaucratic struggles of the period, al-Qasim ibn Ubayd Allah favoured the Banu'l-Jarrah and resisted the pro-Shi'ite leanings of the Banu'l-Furat. The leading representative of the Banu'l-Furat, Abu'l-Hasan Ali ibn al-Furat, only escaped death due to the vizier's own death in 904. Before his death al-Qasim had nominated as his successors either al-Abbas ibn al-Hasan al-Jarjara'i or Ali ibn Isa al-Jarrah, but the latter refused the post, and Ali ibn al-Furat quickly gained the favour of al-Abbas al-Jarjara'i and the Caliph.

=== Campaigns ===
Al-Muktafi's brief reign was dominated by warfare, but he was unlike his father, the "ghazī caliph" par excellence. Al-Mu'tadid had actively participated in campaigns, setting a personal example and allowing for the formation of ties of loyalty, reinforced by patronage, between the ruler and the soldiers. Al-Muktafi, on the other hand, did not "in his character and comportment [...], being a sedentary figure, instill much loyalty, let alone inspiration, in the soldiers", according to the historian Michael Bonner.

==== Relations with the eastern warlords ====
Al-Mu'tadid had had a turbulent relationship with the Saffarids, who ruled most of Persia: their rule over the eastern parts of the Islamic world was recognized by Baghdad, but the caliph and the Saffarids contested control over western Persia, notably the provinces of Fars and Kirman. In 901, the Saffarids had seized Fars, and repulsed Badr al-Mu'tadidi's attempts to recover it. At the time of al-Muktafi's accession, the Saffarids captured Rayy. A military response was delayed by the affair around Badr al-Mu'tadidi, and it was not until 5 November that troops were sent to the region. The result of the expedition is unknown, however, and it is known that the Samanids captured Rayy in the same year. Like his father before him, al-Muktafi preferred to reach a modus vivendi with the Saffarids, and in the next year confirmed them in their control over Fars.

Baghdad's relations with the quasi-independent ruler of Adharbayjan, Yusuf ibn Abi'l-Saj, had never been settled and became increasingly strained under al-Muktafi. In 908, an army under Hakam al-Muflihi was sent against Ibn Abi'l-Saj, but after al-Muktafi's death soon after, a settlement was reached: Ibn Abi'l-Saj acknowledged caliphal suzerainty and was named governor of Armenia and Adharbayjan.

==== Qarmatian uprisings ====
The early caliphates were always threatened by the radical Kharijite sects, which were especially prevalent among the marginalized populations living on the lands between the desert and the settled, agricultural communities and were traditionally hostile to the central authorities. During the 9th century, a range of new movements emerged on the basis of Shi'ite doctrines, which replaced Kharijism as the main idiom for opposition to established regimes. Zaydism-inspired leaders had already established independent dynasties in the fringes of the Abbasid empire, in Tabaristan (864) and Yemen (897), but by the time of al-Muktafi's accession, the core regions of the Caliphate itself were menaced by the Qarmatians, a radical Isma'ili Shi'ite sect. The Qarmatians denounced mainstream Sunni Islam for practices they viewed as deviations from the true teachings of the religion, such as the Hajj and the worship of the Kaaba, as well as the dwelling in cities and the marginalization of the Bedouin. Consequently, the Qarmatians gained many adherents among the latter—although the Qarmatian leadership overwhelmingly came from the urban settlers—and began assaulting the neighbouring Muslim communities. Their missionary efforts soon spread: in 899, the Qarmatian missionary Abu Sa'id al-Jannabi seized Bahrayn, while another base was established in the area around Palmyra. From there the Qarmatians began launching raids against the Abbasid and Tulunid provinces of Syria. In 902, the Qarmatians defeated the increasingly feeble Tulunids and laid siege to Damascus. Although the city withstood the siege, the Qarmatians proceeded to ravage other Syrian towns. At the same time, a Kufan Isma'ili missionary, Abu Abdallah al-Shi'i, made contact with the Kutama Berbers in Ifriqiya. His proselytization efforts made rapid headway among them, and in 902, he began his attacks on the Aghlabid emirate there, an Abbasid vassal. Its conquest was completed in 909, laying the foundations of the Isma'ili Fatimid Caliphate.

In July 903, al-Muktafi decided to personally campaign against the Qarmatians, and left Baghdad for Raqqa at the head of the army. Al-Muktafi remained at Raqqa, and actual command was given to the head of the department of the army (dīwān al-jund), Muhammad ibn Sulayman al-Katib. Other Abbasid forces, under Badr al-Hammami and al-Husayn ibn Hamdan, also operated against the Qarmatians, defeating them near Damascus in July, but also suffering a defeat near Aleppo the next month. Finally, on 29 November 903, near Hama, Muhammad ibn Sulayman came upon the main Qarmatian army and routed it, capturing or killing its main leaders and dispersing their troops. Al-Muktafi returned to Baghdad with the senior captives, who were thrown into prison. Muhammad ibn Sulayman remained at Raqqa to scour the countryside and round up the remaining rebels. He too then returned to Baghdad, which he entered in triumph on 2 February 904. Eleven days later, on 13 February, Muhammad and the sahib al-shurta (chief of security) of the capital, Ahmad ibn Muhammad al-Wathiqi, presided over the public execution of the Qarmatian leaders and Qarmatian sympathizers rounded up from Kufa and Baghdad. In the same year, the Abbasid governor of Bahrayn defeated the local Qarmatians and recaptured the town of Qatif.

The Abbasid victory near Hama did not yet fully eradicate the Qarmatians from the area. Taking advantage of the absence of the local governor, Ahmad ibn Kayghalagh, who went to suppress a revolt in Egypt, in 906, a part of the Banu Kalb Bedouin rose up in rebellion, led by the Qarmatian Abu Ghanim, called Nasr. They raided the Hawran and Tiberias, and launched an attack on Damascus. Although they defeated its garrison under the deputy governor, Ahmad ibn Nasr, they could not take the city itself, and moved onto Tiberias, which they pillaged. Al-Husayn ibn Hamdan was sent to pursue them, but they withdrew to the desert and poisoned the water holes behind them and escaped. On 16 June 906, they attacked Hit on the Euphrates. The generals Muhammad ibn Ishaq ibn Kundajiq and Mu'nis al-Khadim marched against them from Baghdad, while al-Husayn ibn Hamdan moved against them from the west, trying to encircle them. To escape their predicament, the Bedouin killed Nasr and received a pardon by the caliphal authorities. The remaining Qarmatians moved south to Kufa, on the orders of the chief missionary Zikrawayh ibn Mihrawayh. On 2 October they launched an attack on the city, and were repulsed, but they defeated a relief army sent from Baghdad to aid Kufa. Zikrawayh then marched to attack the caravans returning from the pilgrimage to Mecca. In November, three caravans were overwhelmed; the Qarmatians massacred indiscriminately—some 20,000 were reportedly killed in the second caravan alone—and carried off women and children as slaves, along with enormous booty. Finally, in early January 907, caliphal troops under Wasif ibn Sawartakin caught the Qarmatians near al-Qadisiyya and destroyed them. With these defeats, the Qarmatian movement virtually ceased to exist in the Syrian Desert, although their counterparts in Bahrayn remained an active threat for several decades to come.

The distinguished service of al-Husayn ibn Hamdan during these campaigns not only established him as one of the leading Abbasid commanders, but also helped the rise of his family, the Hamdanids, to power and prominence: in 905, his brother Abu'l-Hayja Abdallah was appointed governor of Mosul, which became the family's main powerbase in the decades to come.

==== Recovery of Tulunid Syria and Egypt ====
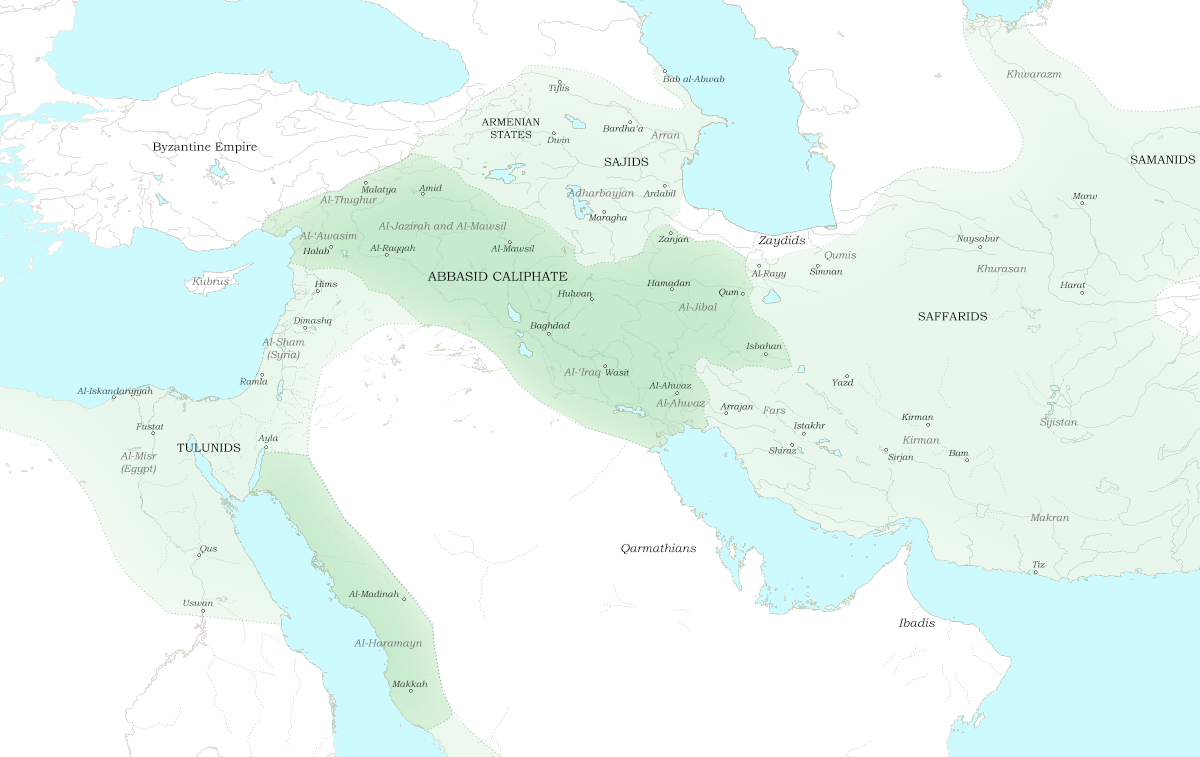
Map showing the result of al-Mu'tadid's campaigns of consolidation, c. 900: areas under direct Abbasid control in dark green, areas under loose Abbasid suzerainty, but under autonomous governors, in light green. Under al-Muktafi, the western provinces of the Levant and Egypt were re-incorporated into the Abbasid empire.

The defeat of the Qarmatians at Hama also opened the way for the Abbasids to recover the provinces of southern Syria and Egypt, held by the Tulunid dynasty. The Tulunid regime had already been weakened by internal strife and the rivalries of the various ethnic groups in the army, which led to the defection of the commander Badr al-Hammami and other senior officers to the Abbasids; the regime was further weakened by the destructive raids of the Qarmatians and its inability to deal with it. On 24 May 904, Muhammad ibn Sulayman left Baghdad at the head of an army, numbering 10,000 according to al-Tabari, and tasked with recovering southern Syria and Egypt itself from the Tulunids. His campaign was to be assisted from the sea by a fleet from the frontier districts of Cilicia under Damian of Tarsus. Damian led a fleet up the river Nile, raided its coasts, and prevented supplies for the Tulunid forces from being ferried over it.

The Abbasid advance was mostly unopposed, and in December, the Tulunid emir Harun ibn Khumarawayh was murdered by his uncles Ali and Shayban. Shayban took over the reins of the state, but the murder caused further defections to the Abbasids, including the governor of Damascus, Tughj ibn Juff. In January, the Abbasid army arrived before Fustat, the old capital of Egypt. Shayban abandoned his troops during the night, and the city surrendered. The victorious Abbasids razed the nearby Tulunid-founded capital al-Qata'i, with the exception of the great Mosque of Ibn Tulun. The members of the Tulunid family and their leading adherents were arrested and brought to Baghdad, while their properties were confiscated. Isa al-Nushari was appointed governor of Egypt. His tenure was troubled from the start: within months, he was forced to abandon Fustat and flee to Alexandria due to a secessionist rebellion under a certain Ibrahim al-Khalanji. He was possibly the same person as a certain Muhammad ibn Ali al-Khalij, who is also recorded to have led a pro-Tulunid revolt at about the same time. Reinforcements arrived from Baghdad under Ahmad ibn Kayghalagh. Al-Khalanji proved victorious in the first encounter with Ibn Kayghalagh at al-Arish in December 905, but in the end he was defeated and captured in May 906 and brought prisoner to Baghdad.

In 906, al-Muktafi married a daughter of the second Tulunid ruler, Khumarawayh. She was probably a half-sister of the famous Qatr al-Nada, another daughter of Khumarawayh who was intended for him but ended up being married to his father in 893.

==== Byzantine front ====
Al-Muktafi kept up the perennial conflict with the Byzantine Empire, with varying success. In May 902, al-Qasim ibn Sima al-Farghani was appointed to command the frontier districts of the Jazira. In 902 or 903, a naval raid reached the island of Lemnos, dangerously close to the Byzantine capital, Constantinople; the island was plundered and its inhabitants carried off into slavery. Nevertheless, in May 903, the newly appointed governor of Tarsus, Abu'l-Asha'ir Ahmad ibn Nasr, was dispatched to the frontier districts with gifts for the Byzantine ruler, Leo VI the Wise (r. 886–912), and in return, Byzantine envoys arrived in Baghdad for negotiations on a prisoner exchange. The exchange eventually took place in September–October 905, at the river Lamus in Cilicia, but was interrupted because the Byzantines reneged on the agreed terms. After further negotiations, the exchange was completed in August 908.

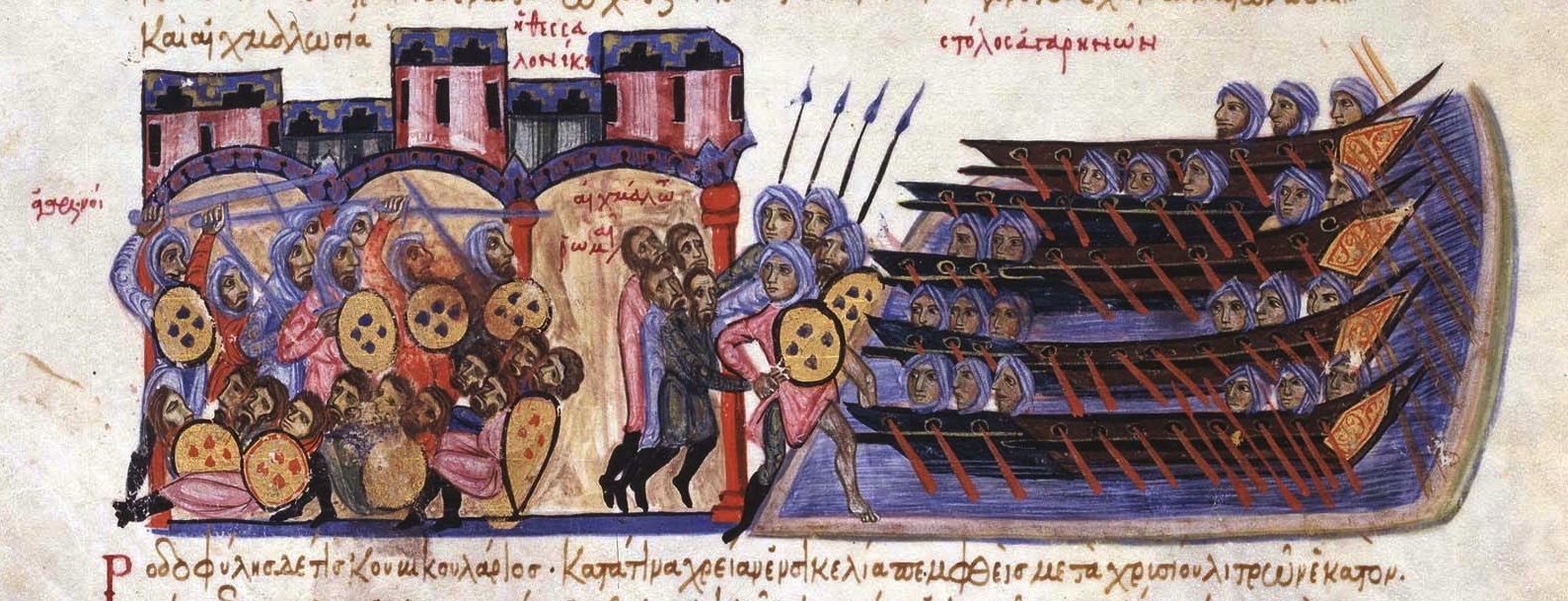
The Sack of Thessalonica by Leo of Tripoli, miniature from the Madrid Skylitzes

In the summer of 904, a Byzantine renegade in Abbasid service, Leo of Tripoli, led a major naval expedition of 54 vessels from the Syrian and Egyptian fleets, whose initial target reportedly was Constantinople itself. The Arab fleet penetrated the Dardanelles and sacked Abydos, as the Byzantine navy under Eustathios Argyros was reluctant to confront them. Emperor Leo VI replaced Argyros with the more energetic Himerios, but Leo of Tripoli forestalled the Byzantines, turning back west and heading for the Empire's second city, Thessalonica, which he sacked after a three-day siege on 31 July 904. The sack of the city brought the Muslim fleet enormous booty and many captives who were taken to be sold as slaves, including the eyewitness John Kaminiates, who wrote the main account of the city's siege and fall.

On land, however, the Byzantines held the upper hand: the contemporary Baghdadi historian al-Tabari reports that in spring/early summer 904, a major Byzantine army, "ten crosses with one hundred thousand men", had invaded the borderlands and plundered as far as Hadath. In November, possibly as a retaliation for the sack of Thessalonica, the Byzantine general Andronikos Doukas invaded Arab territory, and won a major victory over the forces of Tarsus and al-Massisah (Mopsuestia) at Marash (Germanikeia). Further successes followed for both sides. The Byzantines captured Qurus (Cyrrhus) in July 906, destroying the city and carrying off its inhabitants. In October 906, Ahmad ibn Kayghalagh and Rustam ibn Baradu launched a raid that reached as far as the Halys River before turning back laden with spoils and captives. On the sea, Himerios won a victory over an Arab fleet on St. Thomas's day, 6 October 906. In spring 907, however, Andronikos Doukas and his son Constantine defected to the Abbasids, the victims of the intrigues of Leo VI's powerful eunuch chamberlain, Samonas.

A further and unique case of al-Muktafi's diplomatic relations is his correspondence with Bertha, daughter of the King of Lotharingia and wife of Adalbert II, Margrave of Tuscany. In 906, Bertha sent a letter, written in Latin, and rich gifts to al-Muktafi, seeking his friendship and a marriage alliance. Bertha was apparently motivated by the threat posed by the Arab colony at Fraxinetum, and turned to al-Muktafi in the—mistaken—belief that the caliph still exercised real power over the Aghlabid rulers of Ifriqiya. Al-Muktafi in turn replied with a letter of his own, but nothing came of this long-distance correspondence.

== Death and legacy ==
Al-Muktafi was a successful ruler, as well as "a man of sensibility, a gourmet and an appreciator of the verses of poets like Ibn al-Rumi". As the historian Harold Bowen writes, "the Caliphate seemed in his day almost to have regained its former glory", having overcome the Qarmatian challenge and regained Egypt and Syria. His fiscal policies, building upon those of his father, also ensured prosperity and a full treasury, despite the drain and devastation of continuous warfare.

Al-Muktafi, however, was of a sickly disposition since childhood; indeed, he may have been ill for much of his reign. In late spring 908 he fell gravely ill, and for about three months, the caliph lay incapacitated, his situation alternately improving and deteriorating. It soon became clear, however, that he would not survive his illness. Al-Muktafi had nine sons, but they were all underage, and due to his illness, he was unable to determine a successor. The vizier, al-Abbas al-Jarjara'i, sounded out the leading officials of the bureaucracy on the issue—an unprecedented act that demonstrated the monopoly of power now exercised by the civilian bureaucrats. Muhammad ibn Dawud al-Jarrah favoured the experienced and capable Abbasid prince Abdallah ibn al-Mu'tazz, but the vizier eventually followed the advice of Ali ibn al-Furat, who suggested al-Muktafi's 13-year-old brother Ja'far, on the grounds that he would be weak and pliable, and easily manipulated by the senior officials. The choice of Ja'far, who became Caliph al-Muqtadir (r. 908–932), was, in the words of historian Hugh Kennedy, "a sinister development" and inaugurated one "of the most disastrous reigns in the whole of Abbasid history [...] a quarter of a century in which all of the work of [al-Muqtadir's] predecessors would be undone".

Al-Muktafi seems to have recovered just enough to sanction his brother's nomination, before dying on 13 August 908. (Note: His age at the time of his death is variously given as 31 (Islamic) years, 32 years less one month, or 33 years.) Like his father, he was buried in the Tahirid Palace in Baghdad. Al-Muktafi's death marked the "high point of the Abbasid revival" that had been spearheaded by his father and grandfather. Over the next 40 years, the Caliphate would face a succession of power struggles, and lose its outlying provinces to ambitious local dynasts; with the rise of Ibn Ra'iq to the post of amir al-umara in 936, the caliphs became mere puppet rulers, and Baghdad itself would finally be captured by the Iranian Shi'a Buyid dynasty in 946.

During these turmoils, al-Muktafi's posthumous son, Abdallah, was installed as caliph by the warlord Tuzun in 944–946, with the regnal name al-Mustakfi. Abu Ahmad Muhammad, who had wed al-Qasim ibn Ubayd Allah's daughter, was himself involved in a conspiracy against al-Muqtadir in 930, and was briefly a candidate for the caliphal throne in 932, after al-Muqtadir's downfall. He died in 933.

== Sources ==
- Bianquis, Thierry (1998). "Autonomous Egypt from Ibn Ṭūlūn to Kāfūr, 868–969". In Petry, Carl F. (ed.). The Cambridge History of Egypt: Islamic Egypt, 640–1517. Vol. 1. Cambridge: Cambridge University Press. pp. 86–119. ISBN 0-521-47137-0.
- Bonner, Michael (2010). "The waning of empire, 861–945". In Robinson, Chase F. (ed.). The New Cambridge History of Islam, Volume 1: The Formation of the Islamic World, Sixth to Eleventh Centuries. Cambridge: Cambridge University Press. pp. 305–359. ISBN 978-0-521-83823-8.
- Bosworth, C.E. (1975). "The Ṭāhirids and Ṣaffārids". In Frye, Richard N. (ed.). The Cambridge History of Iran: From the Arab Invasion to the Saljuqs. Vol. 4. Cambridge: Cambridge University Press. pp. 90–135. ISBN 0-521-20093-8.
- Bosworth, C. E. (1993). "al-Mustakfī". In Bosworth, C. E.; van Donzel, E.; Heinrichs, W. P. & Pellat, Ch. (eds.). The Encyclopaedia of Islam, Second Edition. Volume VII: Mif–Naz. Leiden: E. J. Brill. pp. 723–724. doi:10.1163/1573-3912_islam_SIM_5621. ISBN 978-90-04-09419-2.
- Bowen, Harold (1928). The Life and Times of ʿAlí Ibn ʿÍsà: The Good Vizier. Cambridge: Cambridge University Press. OCLC 386849.
- Duri, A. A. (1960). "Baghdad". In Gibb, H. A. R.; Kramers, J. H.; Lévi-Provençal, E.; Schacht, J.; Lewis, B. & Pellat, Ch. (eds.). The Encyclopaedia of Islam, Second Edition. Volume I: A–B. Leiden: E. J. Brill. pp. 894–908. OCLC 495469456.
- El-Hibri, Tayeb (2021). The Abbasid Caliphate: A History. Cambridge and New York: Cambridge University Press. ISBN 978-1-107-18324-7.
- Kennedy, Hugh (2004) [1986]. The Prophet and the Age of the Caliphates: The Islamic Near East from the 6th to the 11th Century (Second ed.). Harlow: Longman. ISBN 978-0-582-40525-7.
- Le Strange, Guy (1922). Baghdad During the Abbasid Caliphate. From Contemporary Arabic and Persian Sources (Second ed.). Oxford: Clarendon Press.
- Lilie, Ralph-Johannes; Ludwig, Claudia; Pratsch, Thomas; Zielke, Beate (2013). Prosopographie der mittelbyzantinischen Zeit Online. Berlin-Brandenburgische Akademie der Wissenschaften. Nach Vorarbeiten F. Winkelmanns erstellt (in German). Berlin and Boston: De Gruyter.
- Madelung, W. (1975). "The Minor Dynasties of Northern Iran". In Frye, Richard N. (ed.). The Cambridge History of Iran: From the Arab Invasion to the Saljuqs. Vol. 4. Cambridge: Cambridge University Press. pp. 198–249. ISBN 0-521-20093-8.
- Metcalfe, Alex (2009). The Muslims of Medieval Italy. Edinburgh: Edinburgh University Press. ISBN 978-0-7486-2008-1.
- Özaydın, Abdülkerim (2006). "Müktefî-Billâh". TDV Encyclopedia of Islam, Vol. 31 (Muhammedi̇yye – Münâzara) (in Turkish). Istanbul: Presidency of Religious Affairs, Centre for Islamic Studies. pp. 534–536. ISBN 978-975-389-458-6.
- Rosenthal, Franz, ed. (1985). The History of al-Ṭabarī, Volume XXXVIII: The Return of the Caliphate to Baghdad: The Caliphates of al-Muʿtaḍid, al-Muktafī and al-Muqtadir, A.D. 892–915/A.H. 279–302. SUNY Series in Near Eastern Studies. Albany, New York: State University of New York Press. ISBN 978-0-87395-876-9.
- Tougher, Shaun (1997). The Reign of Leo VI (886–912): Politics and People. Leiden: Brill. ISBN 978-90-04-10811-0.
- Zetterstéen, K. V. & Bosworth, C. E. (1993). "al-Muktafī". In Bosworth, C. E.; van Donzel, E.; Heinrichs, W. P. & Pellat, Ch. (eds.). The Encyclopaedia of Islam, Second Edition. Volume VII: Mif–Naz. Leiden: E. J. Brill. pp. 542–543. ISBN 978-90-04-09419-2.

al-Muktafi Abbasid dynasty Born: 877/8 Died: 13 August 908
Sunni Islam titles
Preceded by al-Mu'tadid	Caliph of the Abbasid Caliphate; 5 April 902 – 13 August 908	Succeeded by al-Muqtadir
