= Zakarawayh ibn Mihrawayh =

10th-century Isma'ili and Qarmatian leader in Iraq

Zakarawayh ibn Mihrawayh, (Note: His given name Zakarawayh and his patronym Mihrawayh are Arabized forms of the Persian names Zakarōya ("Zachary") and Mehrōya.) (Arabic: زکرويه بن مهرويه) often misspelled as Zikrawayh in modern sources, was an Isma'ili and Qarmatian leader in Iraq who led a series of revolts against the Abbasid Caliphate in the 900s, until his defeat and death in January 907.

== Early life and career ==
He was born in the village of al-Maysaniyya, near the town of Saw'ar in the Kufa area, adjacent to the Hadd canal. His father was one of the first followers of the Isma'ili missionary (dā'ī) Abu Muhammad Abdan. Already in his youth, Zakarawayh was appointed a dā'ī for his native district of Saylahin. There he was active among the Banu Tamim, a Bedouin tribe living between the fertile lands of the Euphrates and the Syrian Desert.

In 899, a major rift occurred in the Isma'ili movement, when Abu Muhammad Abdan and his brother-in-law Hamdan Qarmat denounced the movement's secret leadership at Salamiya, which had been taken over by Sa'id ibn al-Husayn, the future founder of the Fatimid Caliphate. Shortly after that, Hamdan Qarmat disappeared, while Abu Muhammad was murdered in the same year at the instigation of Zakarawayh, apparently on the instructions of Salamiya. After Hamdan's disappearance, the term "Qarmatians" was retained by all Isma'ilis who refused to recognize the claims of Sa'id, and subsequently of the Fatimid dynasty. Hamdan's and Abu Muhammad's followers threatened to kill Zakarawayh, who was forced to go into hiding.

== Uprising of Zakarawayh's sons in Syria ==
Map of Syria with its provinces and its major settlements in the 9th/10th centuries

From 900, from his refuge at Saw'ar, he resumed his missionary work among the Syrian Desert Bedouin tribes of Asad, Tayy, and Tamim. His efforts there were less than successful, so in 901 he sent his son al-Husayn, who was called the ṣāḥib al-shāma ("Man with the Mole"), to the western Syrian Desert, for missionary work among the large tribal group of the Banu Kalb. Husayn was successful in converting the Kalbi clan of the Banu'l-Ulays and some of the Banu'l-Asbagh, claiming to preach on behalf of an imam descended from Muhammad ibn Isma'il. The success was such that Zakarawayh sent a nephew and then another son, Yahya, who was known as the ṣāḥib al-nāqa ("Master of the She-camel"), and who assumed the leadership of the movement. The brothers' followers adopted the name of al-Fāṭimiyyūn ("Fatimids"). Their successful conversion of the restive Bedouin provided them with a potent military force, but one with limitations: the Bedouin were more concerned with extracting booty from the settled communities, and were ill-suited to campaigns of conquering and holding territories. The brothers launched raids against the Abbasid and Tulunid provinces of the Levant, even laying siege to Damascus from December 902 to July 903, where the ṣāḥib al-nāqa was killed. The ṣāḥib al-shāma then took over, until he was defeated and captured at the Battle of Hama in November 903.

The motivations of Zakarawayh and his sons have been variously interpreted by modern scholars. Traditionally this movement has been regarded as wholly Qarmatian in character, and a threat to Sa'id, which prompted the latter's flight from Salamiya; the ṣāḥib al-shāma is reported by a Fatimid source to have massacred the inhabitants of Salamiya and destroyed Sa'ids residence when he came there. In recent years, however, the argument of Heinz Halm had prevailed, according to which Zakarawayh and his sons remained loyal to Sa'id, and their actions aimed at securing possession of Syria and triggering a general rebellion against the Abbasids. In Halm's interpretation, Sa'id regarded the uprising as premature, and felt that it compromised his own safety as the brothers called their supporters to visit the supposedly "hidden" leader at Salamiya. Not only did not join the brothers, but left Salamiya with his son and a few close supporters, first for Ramla in Palestine, and thence to Egypt and the Maghreb, where he would establish the Fatimid Caliphate in 909. If the movement of Zakarawayh and his sons is entirely disavowed by later Fatimid sources, it was because of its failure; Halm even speaks of a damnatio memoriae against them. The destruction of Salamiya was an act of revenge by the disappointed and enraged ṣāḥib al-shāma after the death of his brother. As a result, after Sa'id's flight and the defeat of the Bedouin at Hama, the movement headed by Zakarawayh "acquired the characteristics of dissident Qarmatism".

== Zakarawayh's uprising in Iraq ==
Map of southern Iraq with its provinces and its major settlements in the 9th/10th centuries

Undeterred, in 906 Zakarawayh sent another of his followers, Abu Ghanim Nasr, to the Banu Kalb. Under his leadership, the Bedouin sacked Bosra, Dara'a, Tiberias and the Hawran region, and attacked Damascus and Hīt. This activity lasted until Nasr was killed by some of the Bedouin, who hoped to secure an amnesty by the Abbasid authorities, in July 906.

Zakarawayh sent another of his dā'īs, al-Qasim ibn Ahmad, to lead the Bedouin that remained loyal, promising that the day of his own appearance, and of their final victory, was drawing near. Thus inspired, the Bedouin moved into the rural environs (sawād) of Kufa and were joined there by Zakarawayh's supporters. On 2 October 906, some 800 Isma'ili horsemen attacked the city's populace, who had just celebrated the Eid al-Adha outside its walls; they looted the Kufans, but their attempt to take the city was unsuccessful.

The Qarmatians withdrew to the environs of al-Qadisiya; at Saw'ar, they were met by Zakarawayh himself, who now emerged from his hiding to openly lead his followers. In mid-October, they defeated an Abbasid army sent to confront them, and began raiding the caravans of hajj pilgrims returning from Mecca. In November 906 Zakarawayh and his men looted one of the caravans of Persian and Khurasani pilgrims at al-Aqaba (on the modern Iraqi–Saudi border), killing most of them in the process. On 10 January, however, Abbasid troops under Wasif defeated and scattered his men in a two-day battle at Wadi Dhi Qar, near the "Ruins of Iram". Zakarawayh himself was wounded, and died in captivity a few days later of his wounds. Many of his followers also fell in this battle, and others were captured and executed. Their interrogation of Zakarawayh's captured brother-in-law by Muhammad ibn Da'ud al-Jarrah provided the Abbasid government authorities with the "first reliable information concerning the clandestine Isma'ili da'wa organization", and forms the core of the contemporary historian al-Tabari's report on the origins of the Qarmatian movement in Iraq.

Some of Zakarawayh's followers in the sawād refused to accept his death and believed in his return, but his death brought the great Qarmatian uprisings in the Mashriq to an end, although a Qarmatian movement, known as the Baqliyya, survived in the sawād. As Daftary writes, there were several reasons for Zakarawayh's failure: his movement attacked both Sunnis and other Shi'a factions and antagonized both townspeople and peasants; its military component was based on the unreliable Bedouin, who lacked constancy of purpose; and operated close to the heartland of the Abbasid Caliphate, a factor that had doomed many previous Shi'a revolts.

== Sources ==
- Daftary, Farhad (2007). The Ismāʿı̄lı̄s: Their History and Doctrines (Second ed.). Cambridge: Cambridge University Press. ISBN 978-0-521-61636-2.
- Halm, Heinz (1991). Das Reich des Mahdi: Der Aufstieg der Fatimiden [The Empire of the Mahdi: The Rise of the Fatimids] (in German). Munich: C. H. Beck. pp. 66–73, 169–176. ISBN 978-3-406-35497-7.
- Halm, Heinz (2002). "Zakarawayh b. Mihrawayh". In Bearman, P. J.; Bianquis, Th.; Bosworth, C. E.; van Donzel, E. & Heinrichs, W. P. (eds.). The Encyclopaedia of Islam, Second Edition. Volume XI: W–Z. Leiden: E. J. Brill. p. 405. doi:10.1163/1573-3912_islam_SIM_8092. ISBN 978-90-04-12756-2.
- Halm, Heinz (2015). "ZEKRAWAYH B. MEHRAWAYH". Encyclopædia Iranica, online edition.
- Kennedy, Hugh (2004). The Prophet and the Age of the Caliphates: The Islamic Near East from the 6th to the 11th Century (Second ed.). Harlow: Longman. ISBN 978-0-582-40525-7.
- Madelung, Wilferd (1978). "Ḳarmaṭī". In van Donzel, E.; Lewis, B.; Pellat, Ch. & Bosworth, C. E. (eds.). The Encyclopaedia of Islam, Second Edition. Volume IV: Iran–Kha. Leiden: E. J. Brill. pp. 660–665. doi:10.1163/1573-3912_islam_COM_0451. OCLC 758278456.
