= Arabian carpet =

Type of carpet made in the Arab world

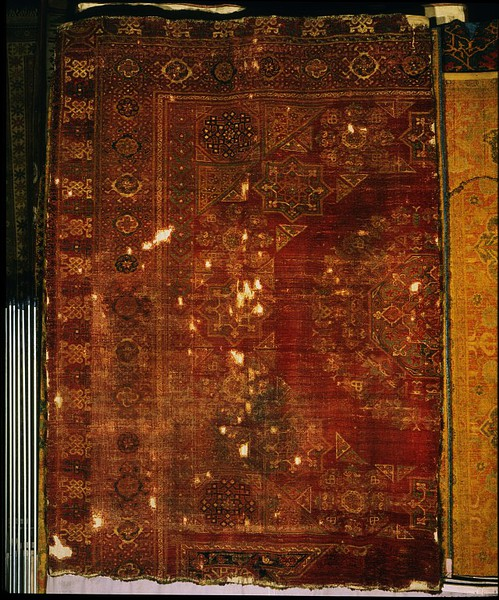
Egyptian carpet made between 1468-1496 CE.

An Arabian carpet (Arabic: سجاد, Sijjad) is an oriental carpet made in the Arab world using traditional Arab carpet-making techniques. Arabian carpets achieved worldwide fame with the frequent use of the Spice Road.

== History ==
Arabian carpets dating back to the 7th century BCE have been excavated in Ma'rib. 'Rihal' is a type of pre-Islamic carpet that was made in al-Hirah, an ancient city that was the capital of the Lakhmids.

== Materials ==
Sheep's wool is the most common material used in the making of traditional Arabian carpets. Other materials, such as cotton, camel hair, goat hair, and flax have been used to make these carpets. In the center of larger carpets silk is likely to be used.

== In Arab culture ==
Aladdin's magic carpet is an Arabian rug that is featured prominently in Arab culture and also inspired The Magic Carpets of Aladdin.
