= Yahya ibn Zakarawayh =

Early 10th-century Qarmatian leader

Yahya ibn Zakarawayh, also known under his assumed name Sahib al-Naqa ("Master of the She-camel"), was a Qarmatian leader in the Syrian Desert in the early years of the 10th century.

Yahya was the eldest son of the Qarmatian leader Zakarawayh ibn Mihrawayh, and a descendant of the seventh Isma'ili imam, Muhammad ibn Isma'il. His name made direct allusion to John the Baptist (known as Yahya ibn Zakariyya in Islam), but he also assumed the title of "Sahib al-Naqa" ("Master of the She-camel") and claimed to be the awaited Mahdi under the name "Muhammad ibn Abdallah". Along with his brother Husayn Yahya established a base of operations at Palmyra. The brothers were successful in gaining the support of many local Bedouin—especially from the Banu Kalb, thus acquiring a potent military force.

From this base they began launching raids against the Abbasid and Tulunid provinces of Syria, with devastating effect. In 902, the Qarmatians defeated the Tulunids under Tughj ibn Juff near Raqqa, and laid siege to Damascus. The city was successfully held by Tughj, and Yahya was killed. Leadership passed to his brother, who assumed the title "Man with the Mole", and led the Qarmatians until his defeat, capture and execution after the Battle of Hama in November 903.

Zakarawayh, the brothers' father, also rebelled in 906 near Kufa but was killed in the next year during an attack on the hajj caravan. With these defeats, the Qarmatian movement virtually ceased to exist in the Syrian Desert, although their counterparts in Bahrayn remained an active threat for several decades to come.

== Sources ==
- Brett, Michael (2001). The Rise of the Fatimids: The World of the Mediterranean and the Middle East in the Fourth Century of the Hijra, Tenth Century CE. The Medieval Mediterranean. Vol. 30. Leiden: BRILL. ISBN 9004117415.
- Daftary, Farhad (1990). The Ismāʿı̄lı̄s: Their History and Doctrines. Cambridge: Cambridge University Press. ISBN 978-0-521-37019-6.
- Halm, Heinz (1991). Das Reich des Mahdi: Der Aufstieg der Fatimiden [The Empire of the Mahdi: The Rise of the Fatimids] (in German). Munich: C. H. Beck. ISBN 3-406-35497-1.
- Kennedy, Hugh (2004). The Prophet and the Age of the Caliphates: The Islamic Near East from the 6th to the 11th Century (Second ed.). Harlow: Longman. ISBN 978-0-582-40525-7.
- Rosenthal, Franz, ed. (1985). The History of al-Ṭabarī, Volume XXXVIII: The Return of the Caliphate to Baghdad: The Caliphates of al-Muʿtaḍid, al-Muktafī and al-Muqtadir, A.D. 892–915/A.H. 279–302. SUNY Series in Near Eastern Studies. Albany, New York: State University of New York Press. ISBN 978-0-87395-876-9.
