= Tughj ibn Juff =

9th-century Military officer in Abbasid Faraghina regiment

- Native name: Tughj ibn Juff ibn Yiltakīn ibn Fūrān ibn Fūrī ibn Khāqān
- Born: Abbasid Caliphate
- Died: c. 906 Central prison, Baghdad, Abbasid Caliphate
- Branch: Faraghina regiment
- Service years: c. 861 – 903
- Rank: Military officer
- Conflicts: August 892 Summer raid against Byzantines

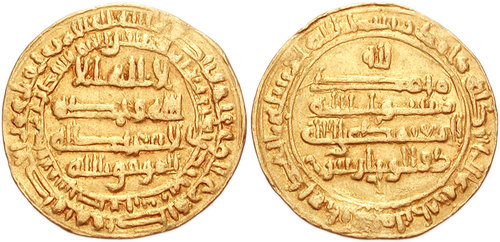
Gold Dinar of Abbasid Caliph al-Mu'tamid minted in AH 271 (884/5 AD)

Ṭughj ibn Juff ibn Yiltakīn ibn Fūrān ibn Fūrī ibn Khāqān (died 906) was a Turkic military officer who served the Abbasid Caliphate and the autonomous Tulunids. He was the father of Muhammad al-Ikhshid, the founder of the Ikhshidid dynasty.

== Life ==
Tughj was the son of Juff, the first member of the family to enter the service of the Abbasid Caliphate under caliph Al-Mu'tasim (reigned 833–842). The family hailed from the Farghana Valley and were recruited by al-Mu'tasim along with many other inhabitants of Ferghana into his army (the Faraghina regiment). His family claimed royal descent; the name of his ancestor, "Khaqan", is a Turkish royal title. Juff and his descendants therefore were not members of the military slave caste (mamlūks or ghulāms), but a freeborn, likely even noble-born, man. Tughj had also brothers, Badr and Wazar, who also entered military service, but they are only occasionally mentioned and little is known about them.

Like his father, Tughj served the Abbasids, but later entered the service of the Tulunids, who since 868 had become autonomous rulers of Egypt and Syria. According to Ibn Khallikan, Tughj first entered the service of Lu'lu', a ghulām of the Tulunid dynasty's founder Ahmad ibn Tulun, but then went on to serve under the governor of Mosul, Ishaq ibn Kundaj, until after Ibn Tulun's death in 884. Ibn Tulun's death seemed to present an opportunity for his enemies capture some of the Tulunid in Syria from his inexperienced son and heir, Khumarawayh. Ibn Kundaj and another strongman, Ibn Abu'l-Saj, as well as the Abbasid regent, al-Muwaffaq, attacked the Tulunids, but in the event Khumarawayh proved victorious, and Ibn Kundaj was forced to acknowledge his suzerainty in 886/7. During the negotiations between Ibn Kundaj and Khumarawayh, according to Ibn Khallikan, the latter noticed Tughj and was struck by his appearance, taking him into his service.

According to al-Tabari, in August 892 Tughj led a summer raid (ṣāʿifa) against the Byzantine Empire on behalf of the Tulunids. He raided the environs of Tyraion (Arabic: Ṭarāyūn) and a place called in Arabic Malūriyah (possibly Malakopea or Balboura). He later became governor of Tiberias (capital of the district of Jordan), Aleppo (the capital of the district of Qinnasrin) and Damascus, and particularly distinguished himself by repelling the attack of the Qarmatians under the Sahib al-Naqa on Damascus in 903.

After the death of Khumarawayh in 896, however, the Tulunid state quickly began crumbling from within, and failed to put up any serious resistance when the Abbasids moved to re-establish direct control over Syria and Egypt in 904. Tughj defected to the invading Abbasids under Muhammad ibn Sulayman al-Katib, and was named governor of Aleppo in return; but Ibn Sulayman himself fell victim to court intrigues soon after, and Tughj along with his sons Muhammad and Ubayd Allah were imprisoned in Baghdad. Tughj died in prison in 906, but his sons were freed shortly after. Following a tumultuous career, Muhammad would go on to establish himself as the master of Egypt in 935, and ruled the country and parts of Syria until his death in July 946. The dynasty he established, the Ikhshidids, lasted until Egypt was overrun by the Fatimids in 969.

== Sources ==
- Bacharach, Jere L. (1975). "The Career of Muḥammad Ibn Ṭughj Al-Ikhshīd, a Tenth-Century Governor of Egypt". Speculum. 50 (4). Medieval Academy of America: 586–612. doi:10.2307/2855469. ISSN 0038-7134. JSTOR 2855469. S2CID 161166177.
- Gordon, Matthew S. (2001). The Breaking of a Thousand Swords: A History of the Turkish Military of Samarra (A.H. 200–275/815–889 C.E.). Albany, New York: State University of New York Press. ISBN 0-7914-4795-2.
- Kennedy, Hugh (2004) [1986]. The Prophet and the Age of the Caliphates: The Islamic Near East from the 6th to the 11th Century (Second ed.). Harlow: Longman. ISBN 978-0-582-40525-7.
- McGuckin de Slane, William, ed. (1868). Ibn Khallikan's Biographical Dictionary, translated from the Arabic by Bn. William McGuckin de Slane, Vol. III. Paris: Oriental translation fund of Great Britain and Ireland.
- Rosenthal, Franz, ed. (1985). The History of al-Ṭabarī, Volume XXXVIII: The Return of the Caliphate to Baghdad: The Caliphates of al-Muʿtaḍid, al-Muktafī and al-Muqtadir, A.D. 892–915/A.H. 279–302. SUNY Series in Near Eastern Studies. Albany, New York: State University of New York Press. ISBN 978-0-87395-876-9.
- Sharon, Moshe (2009). Corpus Inscriptionum Arabicarum Palaestinae, Volume 4: G. Handbuch der Orientalistik. 1. Abt.: Der Nahe und der Mittlere Osten. Leiden: BRILL. pp. 11–13. ISBN 978-90-04-17085-8.
