= Franz Rosenthal =

German Arabist (1914–2003)

- Born: 31 August 1914; Berlin, Kingdom of Prussia, German Empire
- Died: 8 April 2003 (aged 88)

Academic background
- Education: University of Berlin
- Thesis: Die Sprache der palmyrenischen Inschriften (1935)
- Doctoral advisor: Hans Heinrich Schaeder
- Other advisors: Carl Heinrich Becker; Richard Rudolf Walzer

Academic work
- Institutions: Hebrew Union College; University of Pennsylvania; Yale University

Franz Rosenthal (August 31, 1914 – April 8, 2003) was the Louis M. Rabinowitz Professor of Semitic Languages at Yale University from 1956 to 1967 and Sterling Professor Emeritus of Arabic, scholar of Arabic literature and Islam at Yale from 1967 to 1985.

== Background ==
Rosenthal was born in Berlin, Germany into a Jewish family, on August 31, 1914. He was the second son of Kurt W. Rosenthal, a flour merchant, and Elsa Rosenthal (née Kirschstein). He entered the University of Berlin in 1932, where he studied classics and oriental languages and civilizations. His teachers were Carl Becker (1876–1933), Richard Walzer (1900–75), and Hans Heinrich Schaeder (1896–1957). He received his Ph.D. in 1935 with a dissertation, supervised by Schaeder, on Palmyrenian inscriptions (Die Sprache der palmyrenischen Inschriften).

After teaching for a year in Florence, Italy, he became instructor at the Lehranstalt (formerly Hochschule) für die Wissenschaft des Judentums, a rabbinical seminary in Berlin. In 1938, he completed his history of Aramaic studies, which was awarded the Lidzbarski Medal and Prize from the Deutsche Morgenländische Gesellschaft. The prize money was withheld from him because he was Jewish, yet on Schaeder's initiative, he was given a prize medal in gold to compensate him for the loss.

Shortly after the infamous Kristallnacht, Rosenthal left Germany in December 1938 and went to Sweden, where he was invited through the offices of the Swedish historian of religions H.S. Nyberg (1889–1974). From there he went to England, where he arrived in April 1939, and eventually came to the United States in 1940, having received an invitation to join the faculty of the Hebrew Union College (HUC) in Cincinnati, Ohio. He became a US citizen in 1943 and during the war worked on translations from Arabic for the Office of Strategic Services in Washington, D.C. Following the war, he returned to academia, first at HUC and then in 1948 moved to the University of Pennsylvania. In 1956, he was appointed the Louis M. Rabinowitz Professor of Semitic Languages at Yale. He became a Sterling Professor in 1967 and emeritus in 1985.

Rosenthal contributed much to the development of source-critical studies in Arabic in the US. His publications range from a monograph on Humor in Early Islam to a three-volume annotated translation of the Muqaddimah of Ibn Khaldun to a Grammar of Biblical Aramaic. His 1952 History of Muslim Historiography was the first study of this subject. For his translation of the Muqaddimah, he travelled to Istanbul to collate manuscripts of the work kept there, among them one signed by Ibn Khaldun.

He wrote extensively on Islamic civilization, including The Muslim Concept of Freedom, The Classical Heritage in Islam, The Herb: Hashish versus Medieval Muslim Society, Gambling in Islam, On Suicide in Islam and Sweeter Than Hope: Complaint and Hope in Medieval Islam, Knowledge Triumphant: The Concept of Knowledge in Medieval Islam (Leiden: EJ. Brill, 1970), as well as three volumes of collected essays and two volumes of translations from the Arabic text of the history of the medieval Persian historian al-Tabari, Tarikh al-Rusul wa al-Muluk (History of the Prophets and Kings). Rosenthal continued to publish in German and in English. His books have been translated into Arabic, Russian, and Turkish.

== Selected works ==
- Humor in Early Islam, 1956
- The Muqaddimah: An Introduction to History, 3 volumes, 1958 – first complete translation in English of the Muqaddimah by 14th-century Islamic scholar/statesman, Ibn Khaldun
- The Muslim Concept of Freedom Prior to the Nineteenth Century, 1960
- A Grammar of Biblical Aramaic, 1961
- An Aramaic Handbook, 1967
- Knowledge Triumphant: The Concept of Knowledge in Medieval Islam 1970 (reprinted 2007 with preface by Dimitri Gutas)
- The Herb: Hashish versus Medieval Muslim Society, 1971
- "Sweeter Than Hope": Complaint and Hope in Medieval Islam, 1983
- General Introduction, And, From the Creation to the Flood, translation of History of Tabari, 1985
- The Classical Heritage in Islam, 1994
- Man versus Society in Medieval Islam. Brill, Leiden & Boston, 2015. ISBN 978-90-04-27088-6 (print); ISBN 978-90-04-27089-3 (eBook) – covering the monographs and articles on the tensions and conflicts between individuals and society as the focus of his study of Muslim social history

== Awards and honors ==
He served as president of the American Oriental Society and was elected to both the American Philosophical Society (1961) and the American Academy of Arts and Sciences (1971).
