= Battle of Darb al–Kankarun =

950 battle between Hamdanids and Byzantines

- Part of the Arab–Byzantine wars
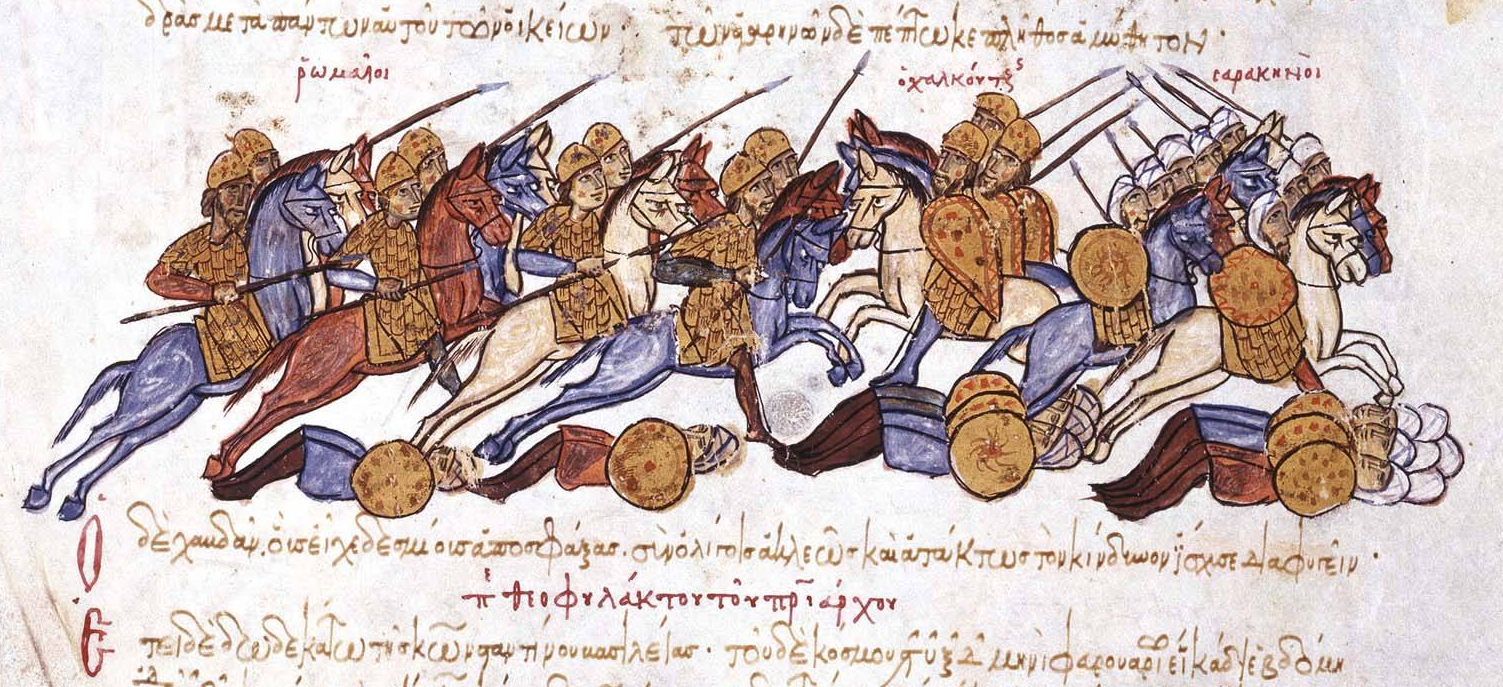
- Leo Phokas defeats the Arabs in 950, escape of Chalkoutzes
Date	25–26 October 950
Location	Between Elbistan and Marash^{[a]}
Result	Byzantine victory

Belligerents
Hamdanid Emirate of Aleppo	Byzantine Empire

Commanders and leaders
Sayf al-Dawla	Leo Phokas the Younger

Strength
30,000 men	Unknown

Casualties and losses
5,000 killed 3,000 captured	Unknown

The Battle of Darb al–Kankarün was a military engagement between the Hamdanid Arabs and the Byzantine army in a mountain pass between Lycandus and Germanicea near Elbistan. The Byzantine sources describe a decisive victory against the Arabs.

== Background ==
After the failed Cretan expedition in 949, the Byzantines were forced to withdraw a large number of their forces from the East. Taking advantage of this, the Hamdanid Emir, Sayf al-Dawla, had been preparing for a whole year to take his revenge on the Byzantines for his defeat in 949. In 950, the emir received an embassy in Aleppo to negotiate a truce and an exchange of prisoners. Possibly led by patrician Niketas Chalkoutzes, this embassy was motivated by the emperor's desire for a period of peace after the disaster in Crete. The emir refused, thinking it would put him in a precarious situation, though it would have enabled him to deal with domestic issues.

== Sayf al-Dawla's raid ==
In August or September of the same year, the emir gathered his troops from Aleppo, Cilicia, and tribal auxiliaries. Having assembled an army of 30,000, the emir took his favorite poets, Al-Mutanabbi and Abu Firas al-Hamdani. The Arabs entered the Cilician Gates and passed through to Caesarea in Cappadocia via Tzamandos. From Tzamandos, Sayf ad-dawla marched north towards Charsianon, where he ravaged its suburbs and surrounding areas and seized a large quantity of booty. Afterwards, he crossed the Kızılırmak River to return south.

Having likely learned that the Byzantine army was assembling north of Charsianon, he decided to leave his baggage in a camp south of the river and, crossing the river again, marched towards Batn al-Luqän, which is probably to be identified with the Kelkit, two days' journey north of Charsianon. There, he inflicted a defeat on the domestic Bardas Phokas the Elder. After which, carrying booty and prisoners, including 80 patricians, he decided to return to Aleppo after a campaign that had lasted two months.

== Battle ==
The Arabs resumed their march south. Unknowingly, the Byzantines under Leo Phokas were preparing an ambush for the Arabs. When they arrived at the pass of Darb al-Kankarün, they were surprised one night on 25 October 950 by the Byzantines, who had been secretly informed of the emir's route by Niketas Chalkoutzes. The road had been blocked by tree trunks. While some of the Byzantines were throwing rock boulders down from the mountains and raining down a hail of arrows upon them, Leo Phokas himself attacked the rearguard. Sayf ad-Dawla managed to break through, suffering heavy losses, but he was attacked again shortly afterward in another defile.

The emir, making a hard decision, had 400 prisoners, his camels, and a large part of his pack animals slaughtered; his baggage burned; and, after a desperate fight, fought his way through with a small number of men, escaped the enemy, and fled toward Aleppo. By the morning of October 26, 950, the Arabs were routed. 5,000 of them had been killed, and 3,000, including emirs and qadis, were captured; all the booty the Arabs had taken was recovered.

== Aftermath ==
Leo Phokas, despite his victory, sent the emir a proposal for a truce, but the latter not only refused but even responded with a threat. Already in the spring of 951, he had assembled a new army and raided Byzantine territory, capturing loot and prisoners.

== See also ==
- Battle of Arghana
- Battle of Hadath
- Siege of Hadath

== Notes ==
- ^[a] Darb al-Kankarun lies in the mountain range separating the Elbistan plain from the Mar‘ash–Hadath region.

== Sources ==
- Alexander Vasiliev (1968), Byzantium and the Arabs, Vol. 2: Political relations between Byzantines and Arabs during the Macedonian Dynasty (In French).
- Anthony Kaldellis (2017), Streams of Gold, Rivers of Blood, The Rise and Fall of Byzantium, 955 A.D. to the First Crusade.
- Warren T. Treadgold (1997), A History of the Byzantine State and Society.
- Georgios Chatzelis (2019), Byzantine Military Manuals as Literary Works and Practical Handbooks, The Case of the Tenth-Century Sylloge Tacticorum.
