= Battle of the Lycus (950) =

Battle fought between Byzantine empire & Hamdanid Emirate

- Part of the Arab–Byzantine wars
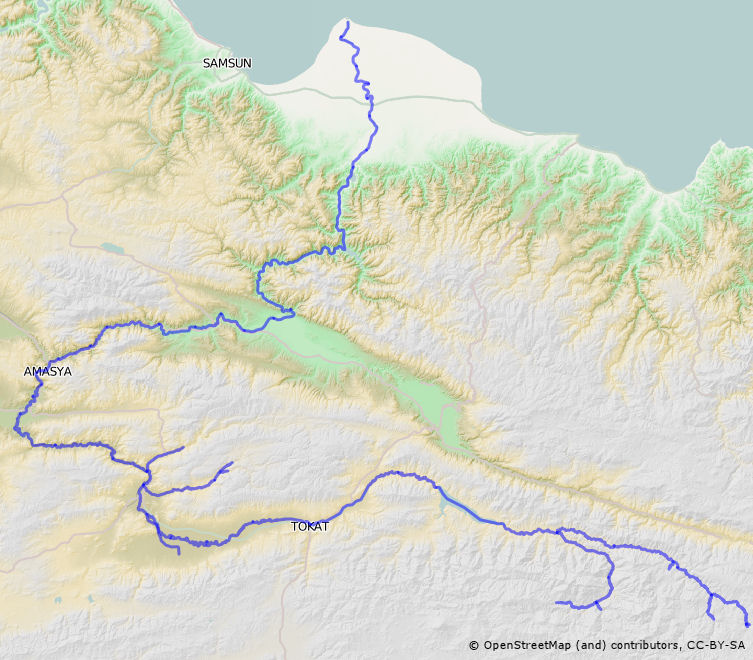
- Map of the Yeşilırmak river and the valley of its tributary, the Kelkit (ancient Lycus)
Date	October 950
Location	Lycus River (Anatolia)
Result	Hamdanid victory

Belligerents
Byzantine Empire	Hamdanid Dynasty: Emirate of Tarsus

Commanders and leaders
Bardas Phokas the Elder; Nikephoros Phokas; Leo Phokas the Younger	Sayf al-Dawla; Abu'l Husayn

Strength
5,000 - 6,000 cavalry	Up to 14,000 cavalry

Casualties and losses
Moderate–Heavy; 80 Patrikioi and officers captured	Moderate

The Battle of the Lycus occurred in 950 during a large-scale raiding attack conducted by the Hamdanid Emir Sayf al-Dawla into Byzantine Anatolia. During the engagement, Sayf succeeded in luring a Byzantine cavalry army under Domestikos Bardas Phokas the Elder into an engagement with his much larger army. The Hamdanid army gained victory in the battle and was able to complete the objective of its offensive after having raided Anatolia extensively, but the subsequent retreat ultimately led to the disastrous Battle of Darb al–Kankarun.

== Background ==
In the year 949, the Byzantine Empire had conducted a highly successful offensive against the Hamdanid Emirate, which saw the defeat of the armies of Sayf al-Dawla and of his nephew Nasir al-Dawla, alongside the sack of Germanikeia and Bouqa. These victories prompted the Byzantines to launch a diplomatic effort to secure peace with the Hamdanids, as they intended to direct their military focus against the Fatimid Caliphate in Sicily at this time. In spring 950, the Emperor Constantine VII dispatched an emissary under Niketas Calkoutzes to negotiate with Sayf al-Dawla in Martyropolis. These negotiations would ultimately collapse after one of Sayf's soldiers struck and killed one of the members of the emissary, as the emir refused to hand the culprit over to the Byzantines and seized the envoys to use as hostages. It is possible that this diplomatic breakdown had been planned by Sayf al-Dawla however, as by this time he had begun preparations for an invasion into Byzantine territory in order to restore Hamdanid prestige following the humiliating defeats of 949, having previously consulted al-Muti, the Abbasid Caliph in Baghdad for support in this endeavour. Sayf initiated the offensive in August or September 950, with his army being reinforced enroute by 4,000 Tarsiote warriors under Qadi Abu'l Husayn, when it reached Germanikeia. The total force Hamdanid–Tarsiote army numbered around 34,000 men.

Sayf ad-Dawla marched through the pass of Darb al–Kankarun to the territory of Lykandos, where he attacked and captured the fortresses of Hisn al-Uyun and as-Safsaf along the Ceyhan river, but bypassed the stronghold of Lykandos itself to advaince into the Theme of Cappadocia. Sayf then bypassed the fortress of Tzamandos and the city of Caesarea and progressed towards to Sariha on the Halys river, which he besieged unsuccessfully. The Hamdanids then turned towards Charsianon, where their vanguard encountered and routed a Byzantine cavalry detachment under Domestikos Bardas Phokas. This was however a minor success, as most of the Byzantine force withdrew to the safety of Charsianon, which the Hamdanids were unable to capture.Sayf al-Dawla then ravaged the vicinity of Charsianon and managed to collect a number of girls and young women as slaves before proceeding past the city of Sebasteia and back to the Halys, where he began advancing southwards, before encamping his army. Bardas Phokas had meanwhile led his force out of Charsianon and marched northeast into the Lycus River valley, where he strengthened his force with additional cavalry contingents, including reinforcements brought by his sons Nikephoros and Leo. The force assembled numbered 5,000–6,000 cavalrymen, with which the Domestikos intended to harass the Hamdanid army as it retreated. However, Sayf learned of this from scouts or spies, and opted to lead the cavalry of his army (up to 14,000 in number) out of the encampment on a rapid march northwards towards the Lycus, hoping to destroy the Byzantine army in battle. This advance continued even through the night and thus reached the valley within a day.

== Battle ==
According to the Arab poet Al-Mutanabbi, who personally accompanied Sayf al-Dawla during the campaign, when the vanguard of the Hamdanid army arrived in the Lycus valley, the army of the Domestikos rapidly advanced towards it, prompting the vanguard to retreat with the Byzantine army in pursuit. However, Bardas Phokas' army pressed too far and ultimately collided with Sayf al-Dawla's main cavalry force, which was deployed in battle order. The topography of the Lycus valley provided Sayf the opportunity to conceal the approach of his full force, so that it is probable that Bardas and his sons were initially only able to see the approach of the small vanguard of the Arab army, and in turn made the mistake of pursuing it to the position of Sayf's numerically superior main body.

The formation used by Bardas' army likely followed the model described in De velitatione bellica for medium-sized cavalry armies, which consisted of two lines with small rear-guard detachments. This formation enabled the Byzantines to rout the Hamdanid vanguard in a sharp engagement, but as Bardas' committed all of his men to pursue the detachment his formation was left without reserves at the point that it engaged Sayf's main army. If Sayf had adopted a cavalry formation typical of Islamic armies of the era, his array at the battle would have included gaps for the retreating vanguard to pass through and regroup behind his main body in order to prevent them colliding with and disordering his forces. With the order of the Byzantine formation having fractured during the pursuit, the larger Hamdanid force was able overwhelming and defeat Bardas' army when the two forces engaged. The Byzantines suffered considerable losses, with 80 Patrikioi and officers captured. However the majority of their cavalry was able to retreat to safety due to the presence of several Byzantine fortresses in the Lycus valley. Bardas Phokas and his sons also managed to escape.

== Aftermath ==
Having temporarily checked the Byzantines, Sayf al-Dawla rejoined his cavalry to the rest of his force encamped at Halys, in order to continue his retreat from Anatolia. Abu'l Husayn and his 4,000 Tarsiote contingent separated from Sayf al-Dawla at this juncture to withdraw via a separate route, likely the one past Sis, into Cilicia. Despite their recent defeat, Bardas and his sons were able to reassemble their force and lead it south to shadow the large column under Sayf al-Dawla. Furthermore, while Sayf Campaigned in the North of the Anatolian plateau, the Byzantine strategoi further south had used the time to assemble a large army with the object to block Sayf al-Dawla's route of retreat by holding and fortifying the pass of Darb al-Kankarun and the nearby valleys. By this point, the fierce fighting at the Lycus valley as well as the previous engagements during the campaign had already inflicted losses and exhaustion on Sayf's invasion force, and the Hamdanids now found themselves trapped between the Byzantine troops holding the passes and the domestikos' regrouped cavalry forces harassing their rear. The result of the ensuing battle was disastrous for the Hamdanids, from which Sayf al-Dawla himself only narrowly escaped.

== Bibliography ==
- Treadgold, Warren (1997). A History of the Byzantine State and Society. Stanford, California: Stanford University Press. ISBN 978-0804779371.
- Kaldellis, Anthony (2023). The New Roman Empire: A History of Byzantium. Oxford University Press. ISBN 978-0197549322.
- Syvänne, Ilkka (2025). Nikephoros II Phokas, 912–969: The White Death of the Saracens. Pen and Sword. ISBN 978-1399005289.
- Vasiliev, A. A. (1968). Byzance et les Arabes, Tome II, 1ére partie: Les relations politiques de Byzance et des Arabes à L'époque de la dynastie macédonienne (867–959) (in French). French ed.: Henri Grégoire, Marius Canard. Brussels: Éditions de l'Institut de Philologie et d'Histoire Orientales.
- Theotokis, Georgios (2018). Byzantine Military Tactics in Syria and Mesopotamia in the Tenth Century: A Comparative Study. Edinburgh University Press. ISBN 978-1474431040.
