= Abu al-Fawaris =

Abu'l-Fawaris or Abu al-Fawaris ("Father of the Knights") is an Arabic honorific name and can refer to:

- Abu'l-Fawaris Ahmad ibn Ali (957–987), last emir of the Ikhshidids
- Abu'l-Fawaris Muhammad ibn Nasir al-Dawla (fl. 948–966), Hamdanid prince and general
- Abu'l-Fawaris Qawam al-Dawla (1000–1028), Buyid ruler of Kerman
