= Nikephoros II Phokas =

Byzantine emperor from 963 to 969

- Emperor and Autocrat of the Romans
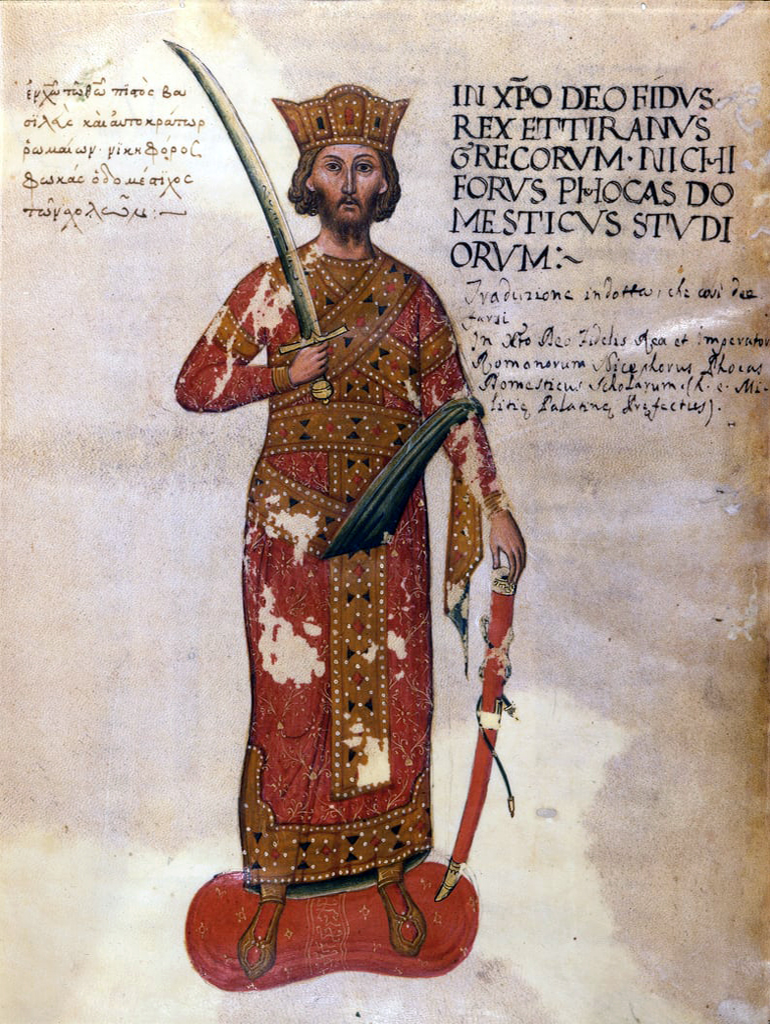
- Nikephoros in a 15th-century manuscript, Biblioteca Marciana, Venice. The portrait is almost certainly imaginary.

Byzantine emperor
- Reign: 16 August 963 – 11 December 969
- Predecessor: Romanos II
- Successor: John I Tzimiskes
- Co-emperors: See list: Basil II (963–969); Constantine VIII (963–969)
Pre-imperial positions
Magistros
Domestic of the Schools; 954/955 – July 963
Monarchs	Constantine VII; Romanos II
Preceded by	Bardas Phokas the Elder
Succeeded by	John Tzimiskes
Patrikios
Strategos of Anatolikon; 945–954/955
Monarch	Constantine VII
Succeeded by	Leo Phokas the Younger
- Born: c. 912; Cappadocia
- Died: 11 December 969 (aged 57); Constantinople
- Burial: Church of the Holy Apostles
- Spouse: Theophano
- Dynasty: Phokas
- Father: Bardas Phokas

Military service
- Allegiance: Byzantine Empire
- Years of service: c. 930–969
- Battles/wars: Arab–Byzantine wars; Battle of the Lycus (950); Battle of Hadath (954); Siege of Hadath (955); Siege of Chandax; Sack of Aleppo (962); Byzantine conquest of Cilicia; Siege of Antioch (968–969)

Saint Nikephoros II Phokas
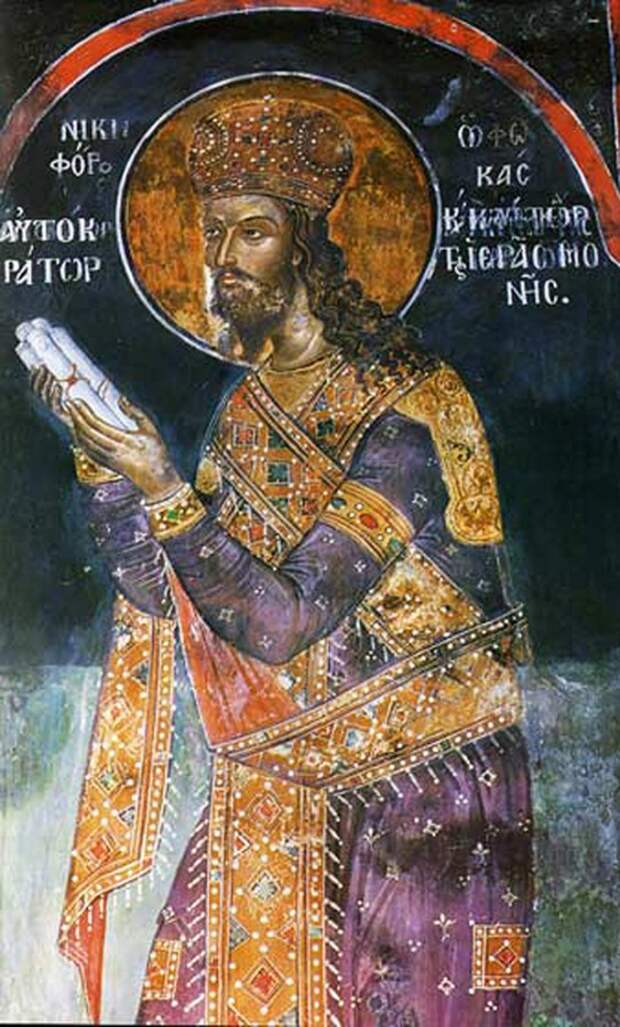
- Icon of St. Nikephoros by Theophanes the Cretan

Emperor of the Romans, Kallinikos
- Venerated in: Eastern Orthodox Church
- Feast: December 11
- Attributes: Imperial attire
- Patronage: Great Lavra of Mount Athos

Nikephoros II Phokas (Greek: Νικηφόρος Φωκᾶς, romanized: Nikēphóros Phōkâs; c. 912 – 11 December 969), Latinized Nicephorus II Phocas, was Byzantine emperor from 963 to 969. His career, not uniformly successful in matters of statecraft or of war, nonetheless greatly contributed to the resurgence of the Byzantine Empire during the 10th century. In the east, Nikephoros completed the conquest of Cilicia and retook the islands of Crete and Cyprus, opening the path for subsequent Byzantine incursions reaching as far as Upper Mesopotamia and the Levant; these campaigns earned him the sobriquet "pale death of the Saracens."

== Early life and career ==
Nikephoros Phokas was born around 912. From his paternal side, he belonged to the Phokas family which had produced several distinguished generals, including Nikephoros's father Bardas Phokas, brother Leo Phokas, and grandfather Nikephoros Phokas the Elder, who had all served as commanders of the field army (domestikos tōn scholōn). From his maternal side he belonged to the Maleinoi, a powerful Anatolian Greek family which had settled in Cappadocia. Early in his life, Nikephoros had married Stephano. She died, and after her death, he took an oath of chastity, before he had become a prestigious ruler.

=== Early Eastern campaigns ===
Nikephoros joined the army at an early age. He was appointed the military governor of the Anatolic Theme in 945 under Emperor Constantine VII. In 954 or 955 Nikephoros was promoted to Domestic of the Schools, replacing his father, Bardas Phokas, who had suffered a series of defeats by the Hamdanids and by the Abbasids. The new position essentially placed Nikephoros in charge of the eastern Byzantine army. From 955, the Hamdanids in Aleppo entered a period of unbroken decline until their destruction in 1002. In June 957 Nikephoros managed to capture and destroy Adata. The Byzantines continued to push their advantage against the Arabs until the collapse of the Hamdanids, except for the period from 960 to 961, when the army turned its focus to the reconquest of Crete.

=== Conquest of Crete ===
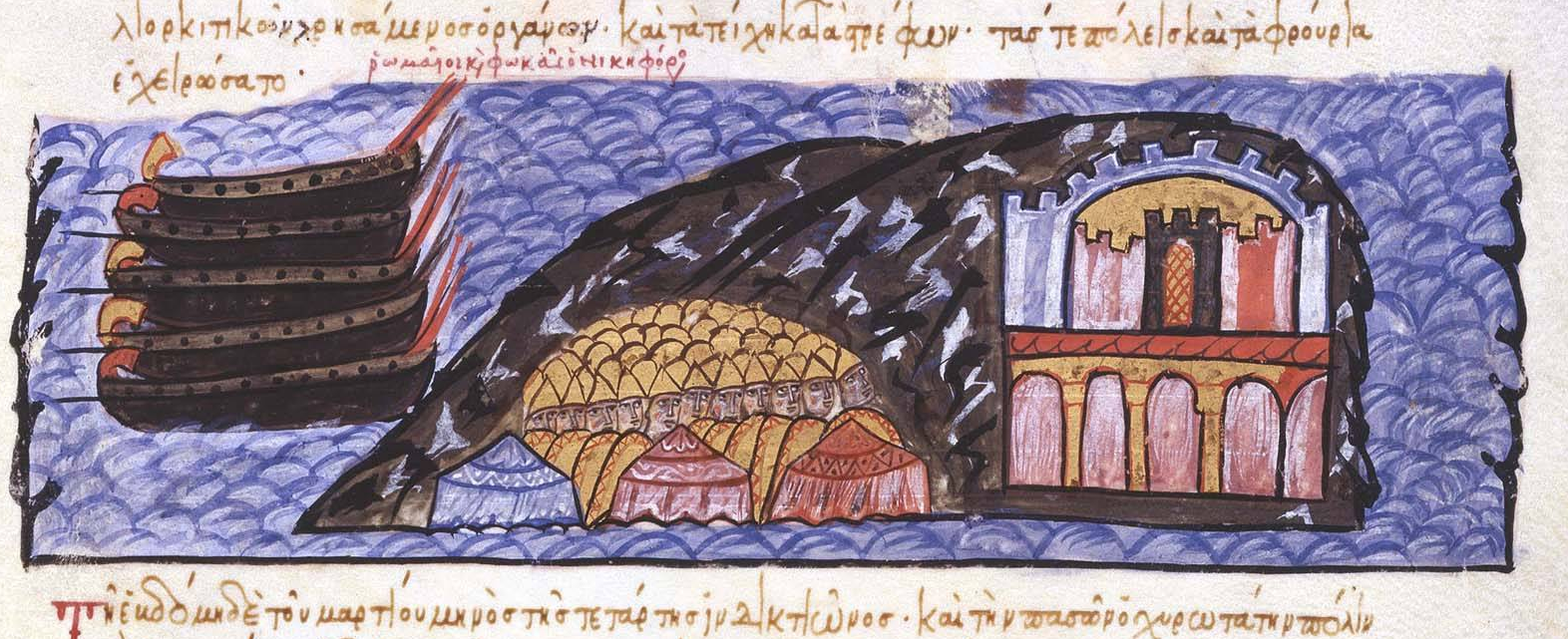
Depiction of the Siege of Chandax by Phokas, winter 960–61

From the ascension of Emperor Romanos II in 959, Nikephoros and his younger brother Leo Phokas were placed in charge of the eastern and western field armies respectively. In 960, 27,000 oarsmen and marines were assembled to man a fleet of 308 ships carrying 50,000 troops. At the recommendation of the influential minister Joseph Bringas, Nikephoros was entrusted to lead this expedition against the Muslim Emirate of Crete. The Byzantines disembarked near Almyros, where they defeated a minor Arab force. Nikephoros soon began a nine-month siege of the fortress town of Chandax, where his forces suffered through the winter due to supply issues. Following a failed assault and many raids into the countryside, Nikephoros entered Chandax on 6 March 961 and soon wrested control of the entire island from the Muslims. Upon returning to Constantinople, he was denied the usual honor of a triumph, but was permitted an ovation in the Hippodrome.

=== Later Eastern campaigns ===
Following the conquest of Crete, Nikephoros returned to the east and marched a large and well-equipped army into Cilicia. In February 962, he captured Anazarbos and threatened the major city of Tarsus, which had recently ceased to recognize the Hamdanid Emir of Aleppo, Sayf al-Dawla. Nikephoros continued to ravage the Cilician countryside and won an open battle against Ibn al-Zayyat, governor of Tarsus, who killed himself after the defeat. Thereafter, Nikephoros returned to the regional capital of Caesarea. Upon the beginning of the new campaigning season al-Dawla entered the Byzantine Empire to conduct raids, a strategy which left Aleppo dangerously undefended. Nikephoros soon took Syrian Hierapolis. In December, an army split between Nikephoros and John I Tzimiskes marched towards Aleppo, quickly routing an opposing force led by Naja al-Kasaki. Al-Dawla's force caught up with the Byzantines, but he too was routed, and Nikephoros and Tzimiskes entered Aleppo on 24 December. The loss of the city would prove to be both a strategic and moral disaster for the Hamdanids. It was probably on these campaigns that Nikephoros earned the sobriquet "Pale Death of the Saracens".

== Ascension to the throne ==
On 15 March 963, Emperor Romanos II died unexpectedly at the age of twenty-five of uncertain cause. Both contemporary and later historians attribute the death to overindulgence in sex and drinking, or suspect that Romanos was poisoned by his wife, the Empress Theophano (c. 941–after 976). Theophano had already gained a reputation for intelligence and ambition, and hostile later historians characterize her as ruthless in achieving her goals. She now became regent for her sons Basil II and Constantine VIII, who had already been crowned co-emperors by Romanos but were respectively five and three years old at the time of his death.

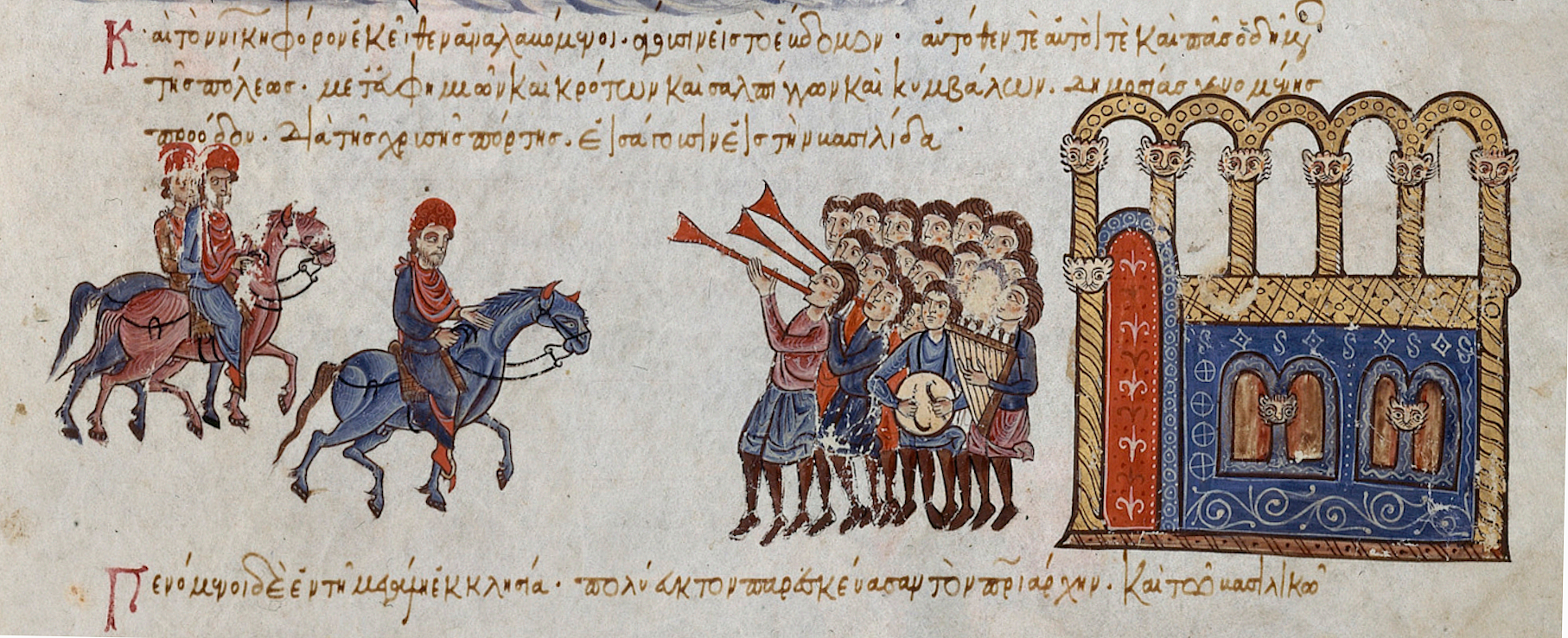
Nikephoros's entry into Constantinople as Emperor through the Golden Gate in summer 963

Theophano's authority was challenged by Joseph Bringas, a eunuch palace official seeking to keep the primacy he had attained in the reign of Romanos. He also tried to reduce the power of Nikephoros Phokas, who had been accepted as the actual commander of the army and maintained a strong connection to the aristocracy. On July 2 Bringas's fears were realized, when the armies, including their highest-ranking officers, proclaimed Nikephoros emperor in Caesarea. Before news of the proclamation could spread, Nikephoros sent a fleet to secure the Bosphorus Strait against his enemies. Around the same time, he appointed Tzimiskes as Domestic of the East, now taking on the formal roles of emperor. He then sent a letter to Constantinople requesting to be accepted as co-emperor. In response, Bringas locked down the city, forcing Nikephoros's father Bardas Phokas to seek sanctuary in the Hagia Sophia, while his brother Leo Phokas escaped the city in disguise. Bringas was able to garner some support within the city from a few high-ranking officers, namely Marianos Argyros, but he himself was not a skilled orator and was unable to obtain the support of other popular officials such as the Patriarch Polyeuctus and the general Basil Lekapenos. The people of Constantinople soon turned against his cause, killing Argyros in a riot and forcing Bringas to flee. On August 16, Nikephoros was proclaimed emperor and married the empress Theophano.

== Reign ==
=== Western wars ===
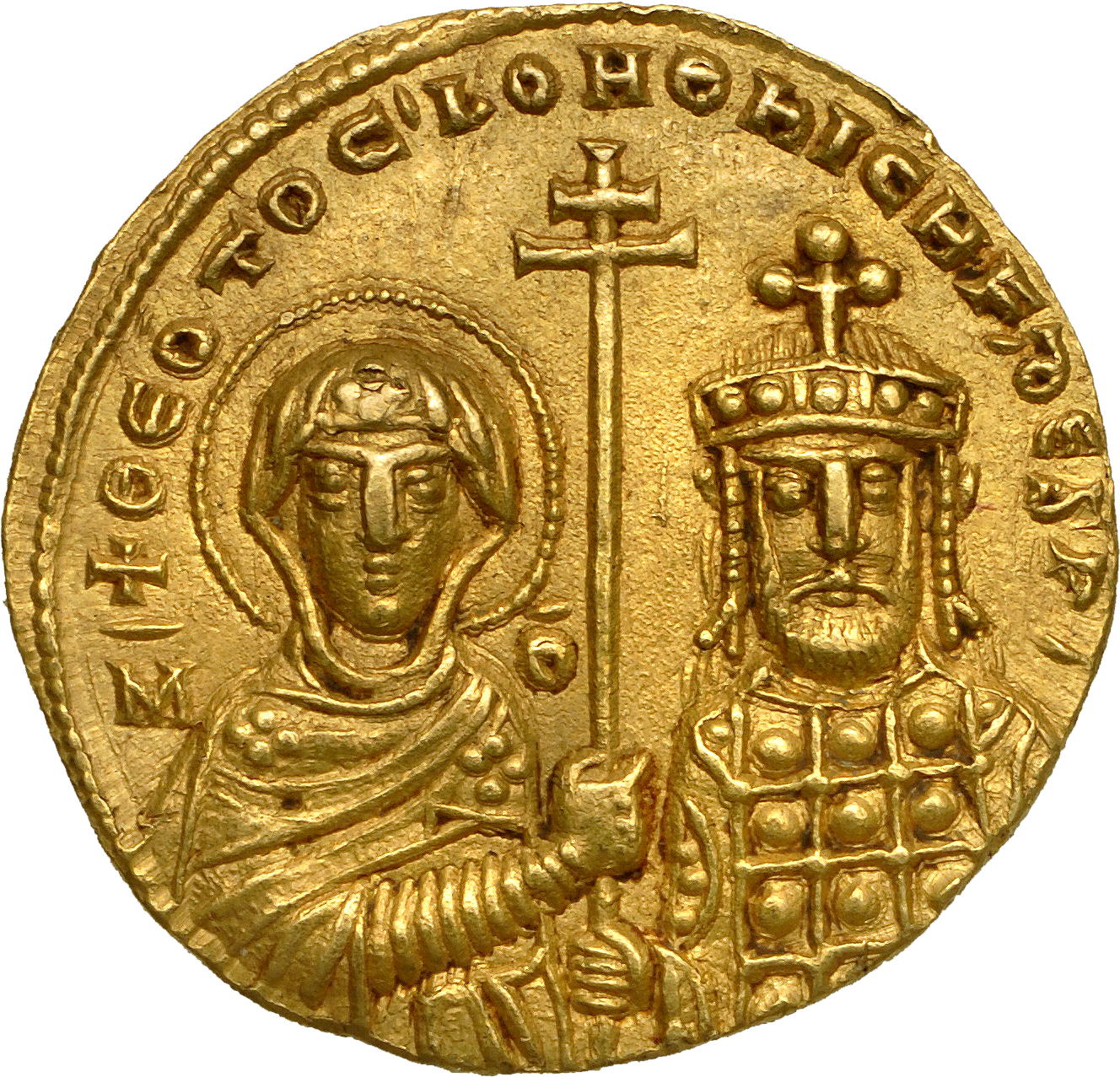
Histamenon of Nikephoros II (right) alongside Mary the Theotokos

Nikephoros II was not very successful in his western wars. Under his reign, relations with the Bulgarians worsened. It is likely that he bribed the Kievan Rus' to raid the Bulgarians in retaliation for them not blocking Magyar raids. This breach in relations triggered a decades-long decline in Byzantine-Bulgarian diplomacy and was a prelude to the wars fought between the Bulgarians and later Byzantine emperors, particularly Basil II.

Nikephoros's first military failures came in Sicily. In 962 the son of the governor of Fatimid Sicily, Ahmad ibn al-Hasan al-Kalbi, captured and reduced the Byzantine city of Taormina. The last major Byzantine stronghold in Sicily, Rometta, appealed to the newly crowned emperor Nikephoros for aid against the approaching Muslim armies. Nikephoros renounced his payments of tribute to the Fatimid caliphs, and sent a huge fleet, purportedly boasting a crew of around 40,000 men, under Patrikios Niketas and Manuel Phokas, to the island. The Byzantine forces, however, were swiftly routed in Rometta and at the Battle of the Straits, and Rometta soon fell to the Muslims, completing the Islamic conquest of Sicily.

In 967, the Byzantines and the Fatimids hastily concluded a peace treaty to cease hostilities in Sicily. Both empires had grander issues to attend to: the Fatimids were preparing to invade Egypt, and tensions were flaring up on mainland Italy between the Byzantines and the German emperor Otto I. The constant tension between the Germans and the Byzantines was largely due to mutual cultural biases, exacerbated by each group styling itself the true successor of the Roman Empire. Conflicts in southern Italy were preceded by religious contests between the two empires and by the malicious writings of Liutprand of Cremona. Otto first invaded Byzantine Apulia in 968 and failed to take Bari. Early the next year, he once again moved against Byzantine Apulia and Calabria, but, unable to capture Cassano or Bovino, failed to make any progress. In May he returned north, leaving Pandulf Ironhead to take charge of the siege. Pandulf was defeated and taken prisoner by the Byzantine general Eugenios, who went on to besiege Capua and enter Salerno. The two empires would continue to skirmish with each other until after the reign of Nikephoros, but neither side was able to make permanent or significant gains.

=== Eastern wars ===
From 964 to 965, Nikephoros led an army of 40,000 men which conquered Cilicia and conducted raids in Upper Mesopotamia and Syria, while the patrician Niketas Chalkoutzes recovered Cyprus. In the spring of 964, Nikephorus headed east. During the summer he captured Anazarbos and Adana before withdrawing. Later that year, Nikephoros attempted to quickly take Mopsuestia, but failed, returning to Caesarea. It was around this time that Niketas Chalkoutzes instigated a coup in Cyprus, which at the time was a shared condominium between the Byzantines and the Arabs. In the summer of 965, the conquest of Cilicia began in earnest. Nikephorus and Tzimiskes seized Mopsuestia July 13, while Leo Phokas invested Tarsus and Nikephoros and Tzimiskes arrived soon after. Nikephoros won a pitched battle against the Tarsiots, routing their forces with his cataphracts. Within a fortnight, on August 16, Tarsus surrendered. Nikephoros allowed the inhabitants to depart unharmed before the city was plundered by his army. With the fall of these two strongholds, Cilicia was in the hands of the Byzantines.

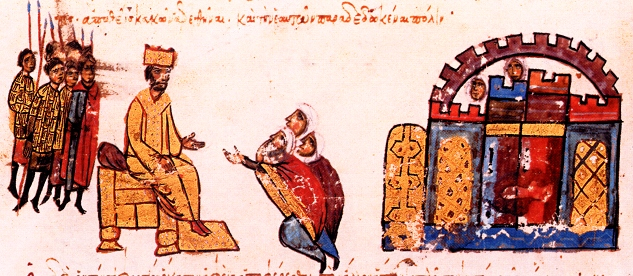
Tarsus surrenders to Nikephoros Phokas (seated).

In June 966, Sayf al-Dawla and the Byzantines held an exchange of prisoners at Samosata. In October 966, Nikephoros led an expedition to raid Amida, Dara and Nisibis, then marched towards Hierapolis, where he took a relic with the image of Jesus to be later placed in the Church of the Virgin of the Pharos in Constantinople. A detachment sent to Barbalissos returned with 300 prisoners, after which Nikephoros raided Wadi Butnan, Chalcis, Tizin and Artah, and finally laid siege to Antioch, abandoning the project after eight days due to a lack of supplies.

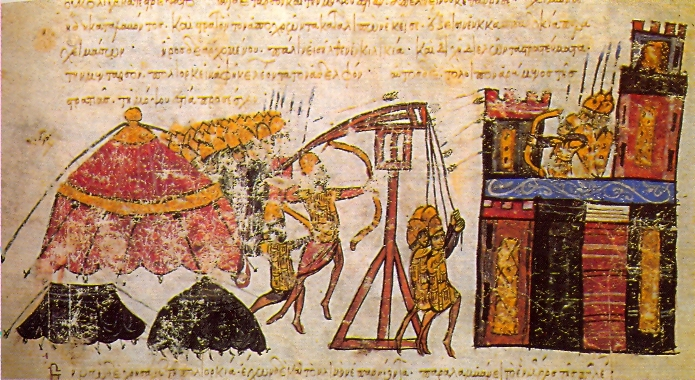
The army of Nikephoros employing a trebuchet to besiege a Hamdanid fortress.

In 967 or 968, Nikephoros annexed the Armenian state of Taron by diplomacy, in addition to Arzen and Martyropolis. He commenced another expedition in October 968 by besieging Antioch for thirteen days. Afterwards the Byzantine army moved south, raiding and sacking most of the fortresses and cities along its path, including Maarrat Misrin, Arra, Capharda, Larissa, Epiphania and Emesa in the Orontes valley, until it reached the city of Tripoli; from Tripoli, Nikephoros moved to take Arca, Antarados, Maraclea, and Gabala, and received the submission of Laodicea. His aim was to cut off Antioch from its allies. Not wishing to damage its buildings, the emperor decided to take it by hunger. A detachment (taxiarchy) of 1500 men was left in the fort of Pagrae, controlling the road from Antioch to Alexandretta, while the occupation of Maarat Misrin, Tizin, and Artach closed potential relief routes from Aleppo and Damascus. The siege ended in 969, when Michael Bourtzes, the patrikios commanding the fort, disobeyed the emperor's orders and took Antioch with a surprise attack, supported by the troops of the stratopedarch Petros, eunuch of the Phokas family. Bourtzes was disgraced for his insubordination, and later joined the plot that killed Phokas.

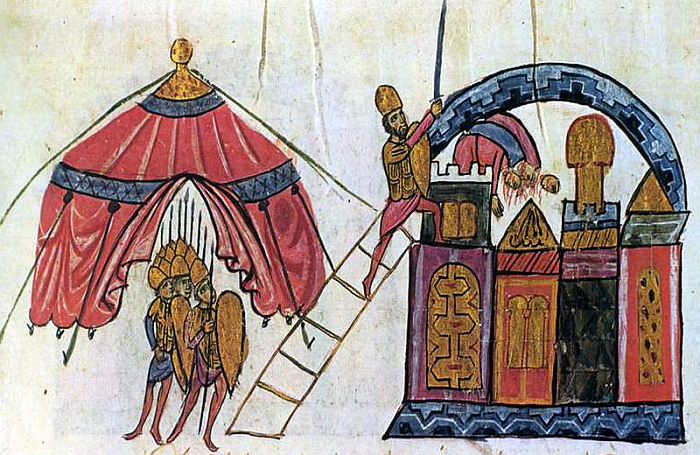
The army under Michael Bourtzes laying siege to Antioch.

=== Civil administration ===
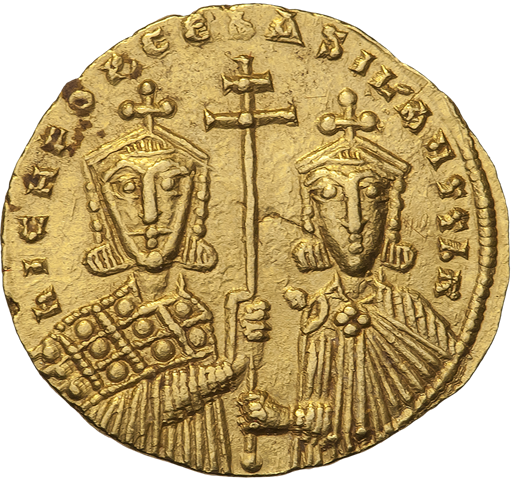
Histamenon of Nikephoros II (left) and his stepson Basil II

Nikephoros's popularity was largely based on his conquests. Due to the resources he allocated to his army, Nikephoros was compelled to exercise a rigid economic policy in other departments. He retrenched court largess and curtailed the immunities of the clergy, and while he had an ascetic disposition, he forbade the foundation of new monasteries. By his heavy imposts and the debasement of the Byzantine currency, along with the enforcement and implementation of taxes across the centralized regions of the empire, he forfeited his popularity with the people and gave rise to riots.

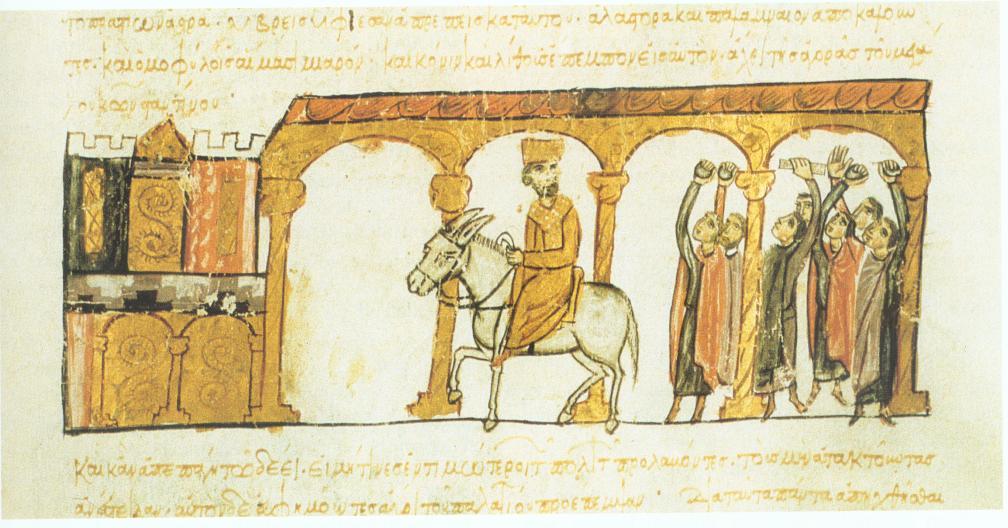
The Byzantine army mutinies against Nikephoros.

Nikephoros also disagreed with the church on theological grounds. He wished the church to elevate those soldiers who died in battle against the Saracens to the positions of martyrs in the church – similar to the status of "Shahid" which the Emperor's Muslim foes bestowed on their own fallen soldiers. In the Christian context, this was a highly controversial and unpopular demand.

In 967, he sparked a controversy in the capital by making a display of his military maneuvers in the Hippodrome similar in style to those displayed by the emperor Justinian centuries earlier preceding the Nika riots and its violent suppression within the stadium itself. The crowd within the Hippodrome panicked and began a stampede to retreat from the stadium, resulting in numerous deaths. In order to repopulate the regained lands in the East, he invited the Syriac Orthodox patriarch John VII Sarigta and his community to live in these lands. The Syriac community subsequently experienced a golden age with many monasteries founded, especially in the region around Melitene, such as the Monastery of Bārid, where John VII Sarigta and his successors came to reside.

Nikephoros was the author of extant treatises on military tactics, most famously the Praecepta Militaria, which contains valuable information on the art of war in his time, and the less-known On Skirmishing (Medieval Greek: Περὶ Παραδρομῆς Πολέμου), which concerned guerrilla-like tactics for defense against a superior enemy invasion force along the eastern frontier; though it purports that the tactics were no longer needed since the danger of the Muslim states to the east had subsided. It is likely that this latter work, at least, was not composed by the Emperor but rather for him; translator and editor George T. Dennis suggests that it was perhaps written by his brother Leo Phokas, then Domestic of the West. Nikephoros was a very devout man, and he helped his friend, the monk Athanasios, found the monastery of Great Lavra on Mount Athos.

=== Assassination ===
The plot to assassinate Nikephoros began when he dismissed Michael Bourtzes from his position following his disobedience in the siege of Antioch. Bourtzes was disgraced, and he would soon find an ally with whom to plot against Nikephoros. Towards the end of 965, Nikephoros had John Tzimiskes exiled to eastern Asia Minor for suspected disloyalty, then recalled him upon the intercession of Theophano. According to Joannes Zonaras and John Skylitzes, the imperial couple had a loveless relationship: Nikephoros continued his ascetic lifestyle, while Theophano and Tzimiskes pursued a secret affair and plotted to overthrow the emperor. On 11 December 969, Tzimiskes and his entourage entered Nikephoros's bedchamber, through a door Theophano had left unlocked, and assassinated him. Nikephoros prayed to the Virgin Mary as he died. Following his death, the Phokas family broke into insurrection under Nikephoros's nephew Bardas Phokas, but their revolt was promptly subdued as Tzimiskes ascended the throne.

== Legacy ==
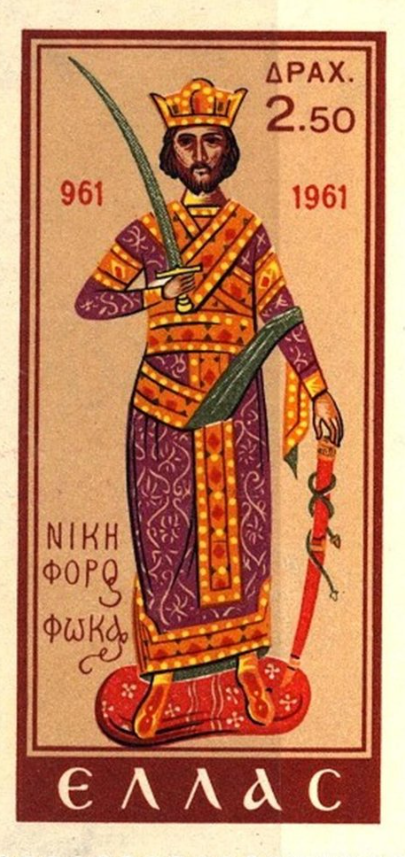
Nikephoros II on a modern Greek stamp celebrating the 1000th anniversary of the reconquest of Crete.

=== Contemporary descriptions ===
The tension between East and West caused by Nikephoros's policies may be glimpsed in the unflattering description of him and his court in Bishop Liutprand of Cremona's Relatio de legatione Constantinopolitana, a work clouded by the ill-treatment its author received while on a diplomatic mission to Constantinople. Nikephoros, a man of war, was not apt at diplomacy. At the time of the embassy his mood had been worsened by a letter from Pope John XIII, who referred to Otto I as Emperor of Rome and to Nikephoros merely as Emperor of the Greeks. Liutprand failed in his goal of procuring an Imperial princess as a wife for Otto's young son, the future emperor Otto II.

Liutprand calls Nikephoros:

...a monstrosity of a man, a pygmy, fat-headed and like a mole as to the smallness of his eyes; disgusting with his short, broad, thick, and half hoary beard; disgraced by a neck an inch long; very bristly through the length and thickness of his hair; in color an Ethiopian; one whom it would not be pleasant to meet in the middle of the night; with extensive belly, lean of loin, very long of hip considering his short stature, small of shank, proportionate as to his heels and feet; clad in a garment costly but too old, and foul-smelling and faded through age; shod with Sicyonian shoes; bold of tongue, a fox by nature, in perjury, and lying a Ulysses.

Whereas Bishop Liutprand describes the emperor's hair as being bristly, Leo the Deacon says it was black with "tight curls" and "unusually long".

John Julius Norwich says, about his murder and burial, "It was a honourable place; but Nikephoros Phocas, the White Death of the Saracens, hero of Syria and Crete, saintly and hideous, magnificent and insufferable, had deserved a better end".

=== Descendants ===
During the last decades of the tenth century, the Phokades repeatedly tried to get their hands again on the throne, and almost succeeded when Nikephoros's nephew, Bardas Phokas the Younger, rebelled against the rule of Basil II. His death, possibly by cardiac arrest, put an end to the rebellion, and ultimately to the political prominence of the Phokades, although Bardas the Younger's own son, Nikephoros Phokas Barytrachelos, launched another abortive revolt in 1022 along with Nikephoros Xiphias.

=== Praecepta Militaria ===
Phokas was the author of a military manual, the Praecepta Militaria.

=== Memory in Crete ===
Due to his role in ending Saracen rule in Crete, Nikephoros II is often featured as a point of reference in legends that circulated in Crete during the later Middle Ages, when the island was under Venetian rule and the local Greek inhabitants sought inspiration in the Byzantine imperial past. Nikephoros II was also brought into the legend of the twelve noble families of Crete by sending one of his sons to be the governor of Crete. The Kallergis family, the most prominent of the Venetian-era Cretan nobility, claimed descent from Nikephoros II Phokas.

=== Modern honours ===
On 19 November 2004, the Hellenic Navy named its tenth Kortenaer-class frigate in his honour as Nikiforos Fokas F-466 (formerly HNLMS Bloys Van Treslong F-824). Also, in the Rethymno regional unit in Crete, a municipality (Nikiforos Fokas) is named after him, as are many streets throughout Greece.

=== In popular culture ===
Nikephoros II appears as a character in:

- Frederic Harrison, Theophano: The crusade of the tenth century (1904). 978-1017148909
- Frederic Harrison, Nicephorus: A tragedy of New Rome (1906). 978-1290581578
- Anastasia Revi, Byzantium 00AD (Stage play 2000).
- Jonathan Harris, Theosis (2023). 979-8668071487

== See also ==
- 10th century in Lebanon § Revolt of Tripoli

== Notes ==
1. John Burke provides the following description: "The portrait does not fit either of the two physical descriptions we have of Nikephoros Phokas: Liutprand of Cremona says he was short with a large head and next to no neck, pot-bellied and swarthy, while Leo the Deacon, who also describes him as swarthy, says that he had bushy eyebrows and that his chest and shoulders were very broad." Ioannis Spatharakis provides the following: "A portrait of this emperor, probably from Crete, in a style more Western than Byzantine, is painted in the 15th century MS. Marc. Lat. 342"
2. Krsmanović 2003, Chapter 2: "The Maleinos lineage was among the members of the old byzantine aristocracy, emerging during the 9th century. It was a family of greek origin with close bonds to the region of Asia Minor. It has been presumed that the surname Maleinos is related to the name place Malagina of Bithynia, a location in the theme of Boukellarion during the 9th century. If one accepts that presumption, one should look for the old estates of the family in the fertile valley of the Sangarios river. It is safe, however, to consider the region of Charsianon as the homeland of the family, according to evidence dating back to the end of the 9th century, or the whole of Cappadocia in a wider sense. It is known that the members of the wealthy Maleinos family had estates in the area of jurisdiction of the theme of Charsianon, the wider region of Caesarea of Cappadocia and Ankyra of Galatia."

== Sources ==
=== Primary ===
- Liutprand of Cremona (968). "Relatio de legatione Constantinopolitana ad Nicephorum Phocam". Archived from the original on 4 March 2016.
- Leo the Deacon (c. 1000). History. Dumbarton Oaks. pp. 98–143. ISBN 978-0-88402-324-1.

=== Books ===
- Bancroft-Marcus, Rosemary (1991). "The Pastoral Mode". In Holton, David (ed.). Literature and Society in Renaissance Crete. Cambridge: Cambridge University Press. pp. 79–102. ISBN 0-521-32579-X.
- Brett, Michael (2001). The Rise of the Fatimids: The World of the Mediterranean and the Middle East in the Fourth Century of the Hijra, Tenth Century CE. The Medieval Mediterranean. Vol. 30. Leiden: Brill. ISBN 9004117415.
- Chatonnet, Francoise Briquel; Debie, Muriel (2023). The Syriac World: In Search of a Forgotten Christianity. Yale University Press. ISBN 978-0-300-27125-6.
- Chisholm, Hugh, ed. (1911). "Nicephorus s.v. Nicephorus II. (Phocas)" . Encyclopædia Britannica. Vol. 19 (11th ed.). Cambridge University Press. pp. 647–648.
- Dennis, George T. (2009). Three Byzantine Military Treatises. Washington D.C.: Dumbarton Oaks. ISBN 978-0884023395.
- Gregory, Timothy E. (2010). A History of Byzantium. Malden: Wiley-Blackwell. ISBN 978-1-4443-5997-8.
- Kaldellis, Anthony (2017). Streams of Gold, Rivers of Blood: The Rise and Fall of Byzantium, 955 A.D. to the First Crusade. Oxford University Press. ISBN 978-0-19-025322-6.
- Kazhdan, Alexander, ed. (1991). "Nikephoros II Phocas". The Oxford Dictionary of Byzantium. Oxford and New York: Oxford University Press. ISBN 0-19-504652-8.
- Keller, Hagen; Althoff, Gerd (2008). Die Zeit der späten Karolinger und der Ottonen: 888–1024. Gebhardt Handbuch der deutschen Geschichte Band 3 (in German). Klett-Cotta. ISBN 978-3-608-60003-2.
- Kennedy, Hugh (2023). The Prophet and the Age of the Caliphates: The Islamic Near East from the 6th to the 11th Century (2nd ed.). Abingdon, Oxon and New York: Routledge. ISBN 978-0-367-36690-2.
- Krsmanović, Bojana (2003). Φωκάδες. Encyclopaedia of the Hellenic World, Asia Minor (in Greek). Athens: Foundation of the Hellenic World.
- Lilie, Ralph-Johannes; Ludwig, Claudia; Pratsch, Thomas; Zielke, Beate (2013). Prosopographie der mittelbyzantinischen Zeit Online. Berlin-Brandenburgische Akademie der Wissenschaften. Nach Vorarbeiten F. Winkelmanns erstellt (in German). Berlin and Boston: De Gruyter.
- Luttwak, Edward (2009). The grand strategy of the Byzantine Empire. Cambridge, Mass.: Belknap Press of Harvard University Press. ISBN 978-0-674-03519-5.
- Maltezou, Chryssa (1998). "Byzantine Legends in Venetian Crete". In Ševcenko, Ihor; Hutter, Irmgard (eds.). ᾿Αετός. Studies in honour of Cyril Mango presented to him on April 14, 1998. Stuttgart and Leipzig: B. G. Teubner. pp. 233–242. doi:10.1515/9783110958614.233. ISBN 978-3-598-77440-9.
- McGeer, Eric (1996). Sowing the dragon's teeth : Byzantine warfare in the tenth century. Washington, D.C.: Dumbarton Oaks Research Library and Collection. ISBN 978-0-88402-224-4.
- McMahon, Lucas (2025). "Strangling Antioch: a Spatial Approach to Conquest". In Theotokis, Georgios; Tsurstumia, Mamuka (eds.). Nikephoros II Phokas and Warfare in the 10th-Century Byzantine World. History of Warfare. Vol. 152. Brill. pp. 78–108. ISBN 9789004724716.
- Norwich, John Julius (1991). Byzantium: The Apogee. New York: Alfred A. Knopf. ISBN 978-0-394-53779-5.
- Spatharakis, Ioannis (1976). The Portrait in Byzantine Illuminated Manuscripts. Brill. ISBN 9789633862971.
- Speake, Graham (2018). A history of the Athonite Commonwealth: the spiritual and cultural diaspora of Mount Athos. New York. ISBN 978-1-108-34922-2. OCLC 1041501028.
- Treadgold, Warren (1997). A History of the Byzantine State and Society. Stanford, California: Stanford University Press. ISBN 0-8047-2630-2.
- Whittow, Mark (1996). Making of Orthodox Byzantium, 600–1025. Palgrave Macmillan Limited. ISBN 978-0-333-49600-8. OCLC 1050969602.

=== Journals ===
- Burke, John (2014). "Inventing and re-inventing Byzantium: Nikephoros Phokas, Byzantine Studies in Greece, and 'New Rome'". Wanted: Byzantium. The Desire for a Lost Emperor: 1–42.
- Mayr-Harting, Henry (2001). "Liudprand of Cremona's Account of His Legation to Constantinople (968) and Ottonian Imperial Strategy". The English Historical Review. 116 (467): 539–556. JSTOR 579809.
- McMahon, Lucas (2016). "De Velitatione Bellica and Byzantine Guerrilla Warfare". Annual of Medieval Studies at CEU. 22: 22–33.
- McMahon, Lucas (2021). "Logistical modelling of a sea-borne expedition in the Mediterranean: the case of the Byzantine invasion of Crete in AD 960". Mediterranean Historical Review. 36 (1): 65. doi:10.1080/09518967.2021.1900171. S2CID 235676141.

=== Web and other sources ===
- Fattori, Niccolò (June 2013). "The Policies of Nikephoros II Phokas in the context of the Byzantine economic recovery" (PDF). Middle East Technical University.

Nikephoros II Phokas Macedonian dynasty Born: c. 912 Died: 11 December 969
Regnal titles
Preceded by Romanos II	Byzantine emperor 963–969; With: Basil II	Succeeded by John I Tzimiskes
Military offices
Preceded by Bardas Phokas the Elder	Domestic of the Schools of the East; 954– 963	Succeeded by John I Tzimiskes
