= Siege of Hadath =

955 siege during the Byzantine–Arab wars

Siege of Hadath (955)
- Part of the Arab–Byzantine wars
- Map of the Arab-Byzantine frontier zone
Date	26 – 29 August 955
Location	Hadath
Result	Hamdanid victory

Belligerents
Byzantine Empire	Hamdanid Emirate of Aleppo

Commanders and leaders
Nikephoros Phokas	Sayf al-Dawla

The Siege of Hadath was a military engagement between the Byzantine army and the Arab garrison of Hadath. The Byzantines under Nikephoros Phokas besieged Hadath, but a relief force forced them to break off the siege and retreat.

== Background ==
After the Byzantine defeat at Hadath in 954, in spring of the year 955, the Byzantine emperor Constantine VII sought a truce and an exchange of prisoners. He dispatched an embassy that arrived in Aleppo on the 13th of May, 955, accompanied by a cavalry force from the border garrisons of Tarsus, Adana, and Massisa. The famous Arab poet Al-Mutanabbi recorded this event and composed a poem in which he portrays the Byzantines as humble supplicants and recalls that Sayf al-Dawla’s custom is to respond to their messages only with his horses, spears, and swords. Nevertheless, Al-Mutanabbi urged the emir to agree to a truce. But the embassy was met with a refusal from Sayf al-Dawla. Which led to return of hostilities.

== Siege ==
In the summer of 955, the Byzantines made a new attempt against the fortress of Hadath, which had just been rebuilt, and laid siege to it on the 26th of August. The Byzantine army included Greeks, Slavs, Bulgarians, and Rus, just as in the previous year. As soon as Sayf al-Dawla received the news of this on August 28, he set out on the 29th to come to the aid of the besieged garrison. The Byzantines managed to block all the surrounding roads and paths to prevent locals from informing the emir of the siege. They also began undermining the walls of the fort. The emir stopped at Raban, but receiving no news of the situation because the Byzantines had blocked all the roads, he set out again. As he approached, the Byzantine retreated quickly while the garrison made a sortie and captured the siege engines abandoned by the enemy. Although Yahya of Antioch mentions that Bardas Phokas the Elder was the one who led the siege, historians argues that it was Nikephoros Phokas who led the army.

== See also ==
- Battle of Arghana
- Battle of Darb al–Kankarun
- Battle of Hadath

== Sources ==
- Alexander Vasiliev (1968), Byzantium and the Arabs, Vol. 2: Political relations between Byzantines and Arabs during the Macedonian Dynasty (In French).
- Georgios Chatzelis (2019), Byzantine Military Manuals as Literary Works and Practical Handbooks, The Case of the Tenth-Century Sylloge Tacticorum.
- Frank Edward Wozniak (1973), The Nature of Byzantine Foreign Policy Toward Kievan Russia in the First Half of the Tenth Century.
- Ignaty Krachkovsky (1924), History of Yahya-ibn-Saʻīd of Antioch (In French).
