= Bardas Phokas =

Bardas Phokas (Greek: Βάρδας Φωκᾶς) may refer to:

- Bardas Phokas the Elder (c. 878–c. 968), Byzantine general and father of emperor Nikephoros II Phokas
- Bardas Phokas the Younger (c. 940–989), Byzantine general and rebel, son of Leo Phokas the Younger
