= Ibn Nubata (preacher) =

10th-century Aleppo-based Islamic preacher

Abū Yaḥyā ʿAbd al-Raḥīm ibn Muḥammad ibn Ismāʿīl al-Ḥudhakī al-Fāriqī, better known as Ibn Nubāta (d. 984/5), was an Islamic preacher (khaṭīb) celebrated for his sermons, active at the court of the Hamdanid emir of Aleppo, Sayf al-Dawla.

== Life ==
Ibn Nubata was born in Mayyafariqin to a family belonging to the Hadhabani tribe, but the date is not known. His medieval biographers assigned him a birth date of 946, but this is considered erroneous by modern historians. He was active at the court of the Hamdanid emir of Aleppo, Sayf al-Dawla, celebrated both as a warrior and patron of art and culture. The Aleppan court at the time attracted some of the most important intellectuals of the Arab world, and has been compared by modern historians with Renaissance Italy. Ibn Nubata died in his home city in 984/5.

== Works ==
His sermons were written in rhyming prose and, according to the historian Marius Canard, followed a three-section pattern: "(1) praise of God and prayer for the Prophet; (2) exhortation to fear God and the Last Judgement and to observe the moral and religious laws, in particular the obligation of the jihad; (3) petition for God's help and blessing, ending in a verse of the Qur'an".

Apart from his regular Friday sermons, Ibn Nubata so composed sermons for special occasions, notably the military campaigns of his patron, Sayf al-Dawla, against the Byzantine Empire. These 'sermons on the Holy War' (khuṭab jihādiyya) were among his most popular works, and are a historical source about the political events of his day.

The 13th-century biographer Ibn Khallikan praised him as "a perfect master of all sciences connected with general literature", as well as a person of "divine grace" and "fine genius".

His sermons were collected along with sermons of his son, Abu Tahir Muhammad, and his grandson, Abu'l-Faraj, in the 1220s. Various editions have survived, with the 1311 Beirut edition being the most famous.

== Sources ==
- Canard, M. (1971). "Ibn Nubāta". In Lewis, B.; Ménage, V. L.; Pellat, Ch. & Schacht, J. (eds.). The Encyclopaedia of Islam, Second Edition. Volume III: H–Iram. Leiden: E. J. Brill. p. 900. doi:10.1163/1573-3912_islam_SIM_3324. OCLC 495469525.
- Humphreys, Stephen (2010). "Syria". In Robinson, Chase F. (ed.). The New Cambridge History of Islam, Volume 1: The Formation of the Islamic World, Sixth to Eleventh Centuries. Cambridge: Cambridge University Press. pp. 506–540. ISBN 978-0-521-83823-8.
- Ibn Khallikan (1843). Ibn Khallikan's Biographical Dictionary, Translated from the Arabic. Vol. II. Translated by Baron Mac Guckin de Slane. Paris: Oriental Translation Fund of Great Britain and Ireland. OCLC 832287342.
