= Battle of Arghana =

956 battle between Hamdanids and Byzantines

Battle of Arghana (956)
- Part of the Arab–Byzantine wars
- Map of the Arab-Byzantine frontier zone
Date	24 May 956
Location	Near Ergani
Result	Hamdanid victory

Belligerents
Byzantine Empire	Hamdanid Emirate of Aleppo

Commanders and leaders
John Tzimiskes	Sayf al-Dawla

Casualties and losses
4,000 killed	Unknown

The Battle of Arghana was a military engagement between the Hamdanid Arabs and the Byzantine army in a defile near Ergani. The Arabs led by Sayf al-Dawla raided Byzantine territory. On their way back, they met a Byzantine force under John Tzimiskes, which blocked a pass that leads to Diyarbakır. The battle ended in Arab victory and the rout of the Byzantines.

== Battle ==
In 956, Sayf al-Dawla went on a campaign, either to repel an offensive by the new domestic or to respond to incursions carried out in the region of Diyarbakır by one of Nikiphoros's lieutenants, John Tzimiskes. He left Aleppo on April 28th, 956; passed through Harran; and from there took the direct route leading to Arghana via Hisn ar-Ran and Hisn al-Hamma, which is modern-day Çermik. He left Ergani on May 10th and reached the pass separating his territories from the region commanded by John Tzimiskes, who at that time seemed to have been strategos of the theme of Mesopotamia and also held Anzitene.

The Byzantines withdrew before the advance of the Arabs, who came to encamp on the shores of Lake Gölcük. Then, after passing near Harpoot, he marched toward the Arsanas, which he crossed using boats and rafts between 12th and 15th May, heading toward Askuniyya, the residence of John Tzimiskes, which was near Çemişgezek on the right bank of the Arsanas. There, the Arabs ravaged two localities, from which John Tzimiskes is said to have fled. They then returned to the southern bank of the Arsanas, burned several villages, and laid siege to a fort called Dädim, south of Harput, from May 20th to 22nd, without being able to take the place.

There, Sayf al-Dawla learned that the Byzantines under John Tzimiskes had occupied the pass through which he would have to return. After passing by Lake Gölcük, the Arabs began their retreat on the 24th toward the Darb Baqasaya near Arghana, which could be the same route by which he had come. There, a fierce battle ensued in which Sayf al-Dawla gained the upper hand. The Byzantines lost 4,000 men killed. After pursuing the Byzantines for some time, Sayf al-Dawla headed toward Diyarbakır, which he entered at the end of the day on May 25.

== See also ==
- Battle of Darb al–Kankarun
- Battle of Hadath
- Siege of Hadath

== Sources ==
- Alexander Vasiliev (1968), Byzantium and the Arabs, Vol. 2: Political relations between Byzantines and Arabs during the Macedonian Dynasty (In French).
- Warren T. Treadgold (1997), A History of the Byzantine State and Society.
- Georgios Theotokis (2018), Byzantine Military Tactics in Syria and Mesopotamia in the Tenth Century: A Comparative Study 1st Edition.
