= Battle of Hadath (954) =

954 battle between Hamdanids and Byzantines

- Part of the Arab–Byzantine wars
- Map of the Arab-Byzantine frontier zone
Date	30 October 954
Location	Hadath
Result	Hamdanid victory

Belligerents
Byzantine Empire	Hamdanid Emirate of Aleppo

Commanders and leaders
Bardas Phokas; Nikephoros Phokas (WIA) Constantine (POW)	Sayf al-Dawla

Strength
50,000 men (Arab sources)	Unknown: 500 Ghulam cavalry

Casualties and losses
3,000 killed many captured	Unknown

The Battle of Hadath was a military engagement between the Hamdanid Arabs and the Byzantine army near the fortress of Hadath. The Arabs routed the Byzantine army who arrived to capture the fort, inflicting heavy losses.

== Background ==
After the Byzantine defeat at the battle of Marash in 953, a Byzantine embassy arrived in June 954 at Sayf al-Dawla's court as the emperor's ambassador to negotiate a prisoner exchange. However, according to George Kedrenos, Sayf ad-Dawla learned at that time that the death of Constantine Phokas, for which he was held responsible, had provoked reprisals in Constantinople, and the captives related to Sayf al-Dawla had been put to death. Sayf ad-Dawla supposedly refused to negotiate, and the ambassador returned empty-handed. Historian Alexander Vasiliev doubts this account, as the information surrounding Constantine's death is highly contradictory.

Whatever the truth, the emir continued the task he had begun two years earlier: to protect the frontier territory from Byzantine incursions by fortifying one of the most important strongholds on the frontier line called Hadath. On October 18th of the same year, the emir arrived there and began reconstructing the fortress. Learning of this process, the domestic Bardas Phokas the Elder learned of it and, two days later, marched with an army of 50,000 (According to Arab sources), including Rus, Bulgarians, and Armenians, and arrived there.

== Battle ==
On the 30th, a battle ensued near Hadath and lasted from morning until evening of the day. Details of the battle are unknown. According to the poet Al-Mutanabbi, he mentions the presence of cataphracts. At the end of the day, Sayf al-Dawla charged with 500 of his Ghulam cavalry against the Byzantine center, completely shattering it. According to historian Georgios Theotokis, they possibly attacked the center where they might have been able to make out Phokas’ banner. In all likelihood, Bardas would have carried his banner in the center just behind the unit of the Cataphracts that would have dominated in the first line. The Byzantines were routed, 3,000 infantry and cavalry were killed, and many patricians and distinguished figures were taken prisoner.

Bardas Phokas's son, Nikephoros Phokas, participated in the battle and fled after the defeat. It is said he hid in a canal in Hadat, and it was only at nightfall that he was able to secretly rejoin his father. According to some sources, he was also wounded. Sayf ad-Dawla, after his victory, remained in Hadat to oversee the continuation of the construction, which was completed on November 12, 954. The walls were rebuilt, and towers were constructed on either side.

== Aftermath ==
After the defeat of Bardas, the Byzantine emperor removed him from his post and appointed his son, Nikephoros, as the new domestic of the schools. Nikephoros proved himself to be vigorous in fighting with Sayf al-Dawla.

== See also ==
- Battle of Arghana
- Battle of Darb al–Kankarun
- Siege of Hadath

== Sources ==
- Alexander Vasiliev (1968), Byzantium and the Arabs, Vol. 2: Political relations between Byzantines and Arabs during the Macedonian Dynasty (In French).
- Jean-Claude Cheynet (2025), "Preface: Les hommes de Nicéphore Phocas" from Nikephoros II Phokas and Warfare in the 10th-Century Byzantine World.
- Georgios Theotokis (2018), Byzantine Military Tactics in Syria and Mesopotamia in the Tenth Century: A Comparative Study 1st Edition.
