= Abu'l-Fawaris Muhammad ibn Nasir al-Dawla =

Family tree of the Hamdanid dynasty

Abū'l-Fawāris Muḥammad ibn Nāṣir al-Dawla was a Hamdanid prince, active as a governor and general for his uncle, Sayf al-Dawla, Emir of Aleppo.

Abu'l-Fawaris Muhammad was one of the sons of Nasir al-Dawla, the Hamdanid emir of Mosul. In 337 AH (947/948 CE) his uncle, Sayf al-Dawla, appointed him as governor of his capital, Aleppo. In the next year, 949/950, he led an expedition against the Byzantine army that raided the environs of Antioch, but was defeated with heavy loss by the Byzantine general Leo Phokas the Younger.

In 959 he led another campaign against the Byzantines, but was captured with all of his officers and escort by Leo Phokas. He remained in captivity until the prisoner exchange of 23 June 966 at Samosata, when he was released along with other Hamdanid prisoners, including the celebrated poet Abu Firas al-Hamdani.

== Sources ==
- Lilie, Ralph-Johannes; Ludwig, Claudia; Pratsch, Thomas; Zielke, Beate (2013). Prosopographie der mittelbyzantinischen Zeit Online. Berlin-Brandenburgische Akademie der Wissenschaften. Nach Vorarbeiten F. Winkelmanns erstellt (in German). Berlin and Boston: De Gruyter.
