= Niketas Chalkoutzes =

10th-century Byzantine general

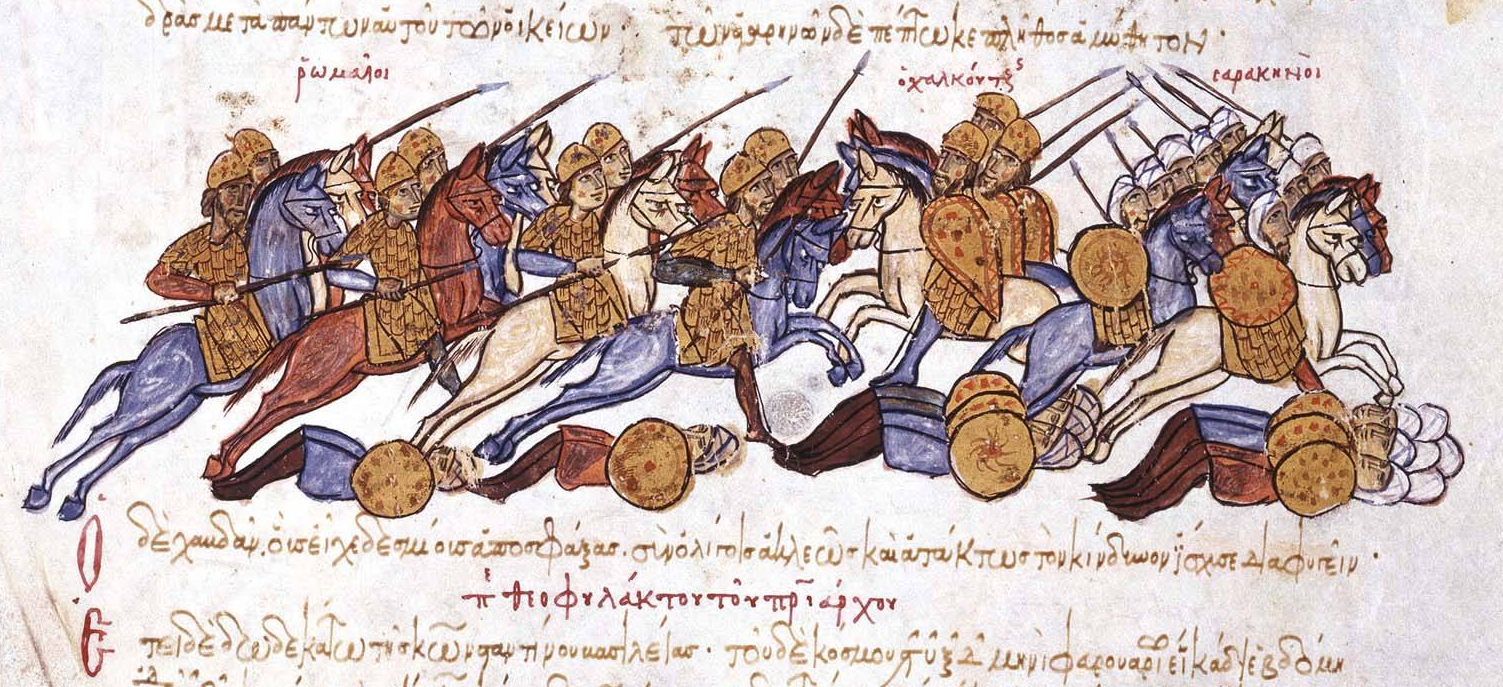
- Chalkoutzes and his entourage escape during a battle between the Byzantines and the Arabs. Miniature from the Madrid Skylitzes
- Allegiance: Byzantine Empire
- Rank: General
- Conflicts: Arab–Byzantine wars

The patrikios Niketas Chalkoutzes (Greek: Νικήτας Χαλκούτζης, fl. 950–965) was a Byzantine general, the first attested member of the Chalkoutzes family. He recovered Cyprus from the Arabs in 965.

He is the first attested member of the Chalkoutzes or Chalkoutses family, whose members are mentioned sporadically until the 13th century. He is first mentioned by Skylitzes and Kedrenos in 956, when he led an embassy to the court of the Hamdanid emir of Aleppo, Sayf al-Dawla, who at the time was engaged in bitter fighting with the Byzantines. According to the Byzantine chroniclers, Sayf took Chalkoutzes along with him in a raid into Byzantine territory, but Chalkoutzes bribed his guards and escaped with his servants during an ambush upon Sayf's forces by Leo Phokas the Younger in a ravine.

Chalkoutzes is then credited by Kedrenos with the recovery of Cyprus—the island had been a Byzantine–Arab condominium since the late 7th century—and its full annexation into the Byzantine Empire. The event is only briefly covered, and no details are given in the sources, while its date is commonly placed in the second half of 965, but may be slightly earlier, perhaps even in mid-964. Chalkoutzes was likely the first Byzantine governor (strategos) of the island after that.

== Sources ==
- Savvides, Alexios G. C. (1993). Προσωπογραφικό σημείωμα για τον απελευθερωτή της Κύπρου Νικήτα Χαλκούτζη και για τη χρονολογία ανακατάληψης της μεγαλονήσου (965 μ.Χ.). Επετηρίς Κέντρου Μελετών Ιεράς Μονής Κύκκου (in Greek). 2. Nicosia: 371–378.
- Wortley, John, ed. (2010). John Skylitzes: A Synopsis of Byzantine History, 811–1057. Cambridge: Cambridge University Press. ISBN 978-0-521-76705-7.
