= Bardas Phokas the Elder =

Byzantine general (c. 878 – c. 968)

- Kaisar
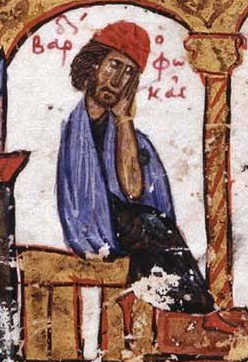
- Bardas Phokas mourning the death of his son c. 954, as depicted in the Madrid Skylitzes

Caesar of the Byzantine Empire
- Tenure: 963 – c.968
- Emperor: Nikephoros II Phokas

Magistros
- Domestic of the Schools of the East; 945–954/955
- Monarch: Constantine VII
- Succeeded by: Nikephoros Phokas

Patrikios
- Strategos of Anatolikon after 910 – before 919
- Strategos of Cappadocia c. 910
- Monarchs: Alexander; Leo VI
- Born: c. 878
- Died: c. 968
- Issue: Nikephoros II Phokas; Leo Phokas the Younger; Constantine Phokas
- Father: Nikephoros Phokas the Elder

Military service
- Allegiance: Byzantine Empire
- Years of service: 910s–955
- Battles/wars: Byzantine–Bulgarian war of 913–927; Battle of Achelous (917); Rus'-Byzantine War (941–944); Arab–Byzantine wars; Siege of Theodosiopolis (949); Battle of the Lycus (950); Battle of Marash (953); Battle of Hadath (954)

Bardas Phokas (Greek: Βάρδας Φωκᾶς; c. 878 – c. 968) was a notable Byzantine general in the first half of the 10th century. He was the father of emperor Nikephoros II Phokas and the kouropalates Leo Phokas the Younger, and was also the maternal grandfather of the emperor John I Tzimiskes. His wife, daughter of Eudokimos Maleinos and a daughter of patrikios Adralestos, belonged to the Maleinoi, a powerful Anatolian Greek family which had settled in Cappadocia.

Bardas was the scion of the Phokas family, one of the great houses of military aristocracy, his father was Nikephoros Phokas the Elder, an eminent Byzantine general with a distinguished record of service in Italy. In 917, he participated under the orders of his elder brother Leo in the disastrous Battle of Acheloos.

In 941, he was governor of the Theme of Armeniakon, in the area previously known as Paphlagonia. In this year the Rus' navy under the leadership of Igor I of Kiev attacked the Empire. Driven off from Constantinople, the Rus' landed in Bithynia and ravaged it. Bardas kept the attackers from doing too much damage with his local militia levies until the larger Byzantine army under John Kourkouas came and drove the Rus' out.

In 945 he was appointed supreme commander of the Byzantine armies of the East by Emperor Constantine VII Porphyrogenitus. In this command he did not make much progress against the Arab forces, being repeatedly defeated by Sayf al-Daula, emir of Aleppo. In 953, he was defeated and severely wounded by Sayf, which lead to the capture and death of his youngest son Constantine, and after further defeats, he was replaced by his eldest son Nikephoros in 954/955.

When Nikephoros came to the throne he made his father Caesar, only a step below the imperial title. He died about 968 at the age of 90.

== Sources ==
- Krsmanović, Bojana (2003). Φωκάδες. Encyclopaedia of the Hellenic World, Asia Minor (in Greek). Athens: Foundation of the Hellenic World.
- Kazhdan, Alexander, ed. (1991). "Nikephoros II Phocas". The Oxford Dictionary of Byzantium. Oxford and New York: Oxford University Press. ISBN 0-19-504652-8.

Preceded by Pantherios	Domestic of the Schools; 945–954	Succeeded by Nikephoros Phokas
