= List of Abbasid governors of Tarsus =

Tarsus is a city in Cilicia, a region in southeastern Asia Minor (modern Turkey). The city came under Roman rule since 67 BC, until the mid-7th century, when following the Muslim conquest of the Levant control was disputed with the nascent caliphate. During the conflicts between the Byzantines and the Umayyad Caliphate, the city lay in the disputed no-man's-land between the two empires and changed hands frequently, becoming deserted and ruined in the process. In 778/9 the Abbasids undertook the first attempt to restore the city as a base of operations against Byzantium, but the work was apparently not completed. It was not until 787/8 that the city was rebuilt and resettled by Faraj ibn Sulaym al-Khadim, on the orders of Caliph Harun al-Rashid (r. 786–809). 3,000 Khurasanis and 2,000 Syrians (a thousand each from Antioch and al-Massisa) were given houses and land in the new fortress city.

Tarsus was apparently recovered by the Byzantines soon after, at some point around the turn of the century. The city probably remained in Byzantine hands during the Abbasid civil war of the Fourth Fitna, but had returned to Muslim control by 830, when Caliph al-Ma'mun (r. 813–833) recommenced offensive campaigns against Byzantium. The governors of Tarsus often also exercised the governorship of the entire Syrian marches (al-thughur al-Shamiyya), and their main duty was organizing the annual raids against the Byzantines. The city remained under direct Abbasid control until 878/9, when it and the marches with Byzantium passed to the autonomous ruler of Egypt, Ahmad ibn Tulun. The governor Yazaman al-Khadim returned the city to Abbasid allegiance from 882 on, but was forced to recognize Tulunid overlordship again in 890. Tulunid possession of the thughur lasted until the death of Ibn Tulun's heir, Khumarawayh, in 896, after which Caliph al-Mu'tadid (r. 892–902) re-asserted direct control over the border regions. In 946/7, Tarsus recognized the overlordship of the Hamdanid emir Sayf al-Dawla of Aleppo, who had become the new master of northern Syria and of the Byzantine borderlands. Facing a resurgent Byzantium, he was able to stem the Byzantine advance for a while, but in 965, the Byzantine emperor Nikephoros II Phokas (r. 963–969) captured the city and the rest of Cilicia, ending Muslim rule there.

== List of governors ==
Name	Tenure	Notes	Refs
Yazid ibn Makhlad al-Fazari	788	Disliked and driven out by the Khurasani garrison, due to his excessive pride in belonging to the pro-Umayyad family of Umar ibn Hubayra	
Abu'l-Fawaris	789/90 – ?	Only the date of his appointment is known.	
Thabit ibn Nasr ibn Malik al-Khuza'i	ca. 807/8	Titled "amir of the Syrian marches".	
Ahmad ibn Sa'id ibn Salm ibn Qutayba al-Bahili	845	Led a prisoner exchange with the Byzantines in September, deposed after a failed winter raid into Byzantine territory.	
Nasr ibn Hamza al-Khuza'i	18 Jan. 846 – ?	Only the date of his appointment is known.	
Ali ibn Yahya al-Armani	by 852/3 – Oct./Nov. 862	A prominent figure in the wars with Byzantium, led several summer raids and oversaw two prisoner exchanges, in 856 and April 860.	
Muhammad ibn Harun al-Taghlibi	871/2 (?)	Appointed to the post but died before reaching Tarsus.	
Muhammad ibn Ali al-Armani	872 – 873/4	Killed by the Byzantines.	
Urkhuz ibn Ulugh Tarkhan	873/4 – ca. 876	Deposed for embezzling the salaries of the garrison of Loulon, leading to its surrender to the Byzantines.	
Abdallah ibn Rashid ibn Kawus	877/8	Defeated and captured in battle by the Byzantines.	
Takhshi	878	Appointed by Ahmad ibn Tulun after his departure from Tarsus in 878.	
Sima	ca. 879/80	Appointed by Ahmad ibn Tulun.	
Khalaf al-Farghani	by 881 – 882	Appointed by Ahmad ibn Tulun. Deposed by pro-Abbasid faction under Yazaman.	
Yazaman al-Khadim	882 – 23 Oct. 891	Leader of the pro-Abbasid faction, he led several expeditions against the Byzantines. In October 890 acknowledged Tulunid suzerainty. Died from wounds on campaign against Byzantium.	
Ahmad ibn Tughan al-Ujayfi	Oct. 891 – by summer 892	Succeeded Yazaman, initially confirmed by Khumarawayh, but soon replaced by Khumarawayh's cousin.	
Muhammad ibn Musa ibn Tulun	summer 892	Member of the Tulunid family, appointed by Khumarawayh, deposed and seized by the populace in August 892.	
Ahmad ibn Tughan al-Ujayfi	Nov. 892 – Oct. 896	Restored to governorship by Khumarawayh. Oversaw the prisoner exchange of October 896, and then departed Tarsus by sea.	
Damian of Tarsus	Oct. 896 – Mar./Apr. 897	Byzantine renegade, he was left in charge of Tarsus by al-Ujayfi. Deposed and arrested by a pro-Abbasid uprising.	
Ibn al-Ikhshad	Apr. 898 – early 900	Appointed by Caliph al-Mu'tadid. Killed in an expedition against the Byzantines.	
Abu Thabit	900	Ibn al-Ikhshad's deputy, he succeeded him after his death, but was captured himself by the Byzantines in March 900.	
Ali ibn al-Arabi	Apr. 900	Elected by the elders of Tarsus to succeed Abu Thabit.	
Nizar ibn Muhammad	ca. 900/1	Appointed by the governor of the marches, al-Hasan ibn Ali Kura.	
Muzaffar ibn al-Hajj	ca. 902/3	Deposed.	
Abu'l-Asha'ir Ahmad ibn Nasr	22 Mar. 903 – 905	Successor of Muzaffar ibn al-Hajj.	
Rustam ibn Bardaw al-Farghani	20 Aug. 905 – 912/3	Led several raids against Byzantium and supervised the prisoner exchanges of September 905 and 908. He also helped the rebel Andronikos Doukas flee to Arab territory.	
Bishr al-Afshini	912/3 – after 918	Led several raids against Byzantium and supervised the prisoner exchange of autumn 917.	
Thamal al-Dulafi	by 923 – ca. 932	A successful naval commander, he led several raids against Byzantium, even sacking Amorium and making contact with Simeon I of Bulgaria for a common front. He supervised a prisoner exchange in autumn 925.	
Bushra al-Thamali	ca. 938	Former lieutenant of Thamal al-Dulafi, supervised the prisoner exchange of autumn 938.	
Nasr al-Thamali	ca. 941 – 946	Former lieutenant of Thamal al-Dulafi, attested in the post in winter 941/2, and supervised the prisoner exchange of October 946. From July 946 under the overlordship of Sayf al-Dawla.	
Ibn az-Zayyat	by 956/7 – 961/2	Appointed by Sayf al-Dawla. In late 961 recognized once more directly the Abbasid caliph, but was defeated by the Byzantines and committed suicide. Tarsus returned to Sayf al-Dawla's allegiance.	
Rashiq al-Nasimi	early 962 – 16 Aug. 965	Succeeded Ibn al-Zayyat. Governor of Tarsus until the city's surrender to Nikephoros Phokas on 16 August 965.	

== Sources ==
- Bosworth, C. E. (1992). "The City of Tarsus and the Arab-Byzantine Frontiers in Early and Middle ʿAbbāsid Times". Oriens. 33: 268–286. doi:10.1163/1877837292X00105. ISSN 0078-6527. JSTOR 1580607.
- Kraemer, Joel L., ed. (1989). The History of al-Ṭabarī, Volume XXXIV: Incipient Decline: The Caliphates of al-Wāthiq, al-Mutawakkil and al-Muntaṣir, A.D. 841–863/A.H. 227–248. SUNY Series in Near Eastern Studies. Albany, New York: State University of New York Press. ISBN 978-0-88706-874-4.
- Lilie, Ralph-Johannes; Ludwig, Claudia; Pratsch, Thomas; Zielke, Beate (2013). Prosopographie der mittelbyzantinischen Zeit Online. Berlin-Brandenburgische Akademie der Wissenschaften. Nach Vorarbeiten F. Winkelmanns erstellt (in German). Berlin and Boston: De Gruyter.
- Stern, S. M. (1960). "The Coins of Thamal and of Other Governors of Tarsus". Journal of the American Oriental Society. 80 (3): 217–225. doi:10.2307/596170. JSTOR 596170.
