= Michael Toxaras =

Byzantine diplomat

Michael Toxaras (Greek: Μιχαήλ Τοξαρᾶς) was a Byzantine diplomat.

Toxaras is mentioned for the first time as a member of an embassy sent to the Abbasid court in Baghdad in June 917, and recorded in the Kitab al-'Uyun. The embassy was led by John Rhadenos, accompanied by Toxaras, who was already over 70 years old at the time, and twenty attendants. The embassy arrived in Baghdad on 25 June and was received by the Caliph al-Muqtadir at the Taj Palace on 17 July, and a truce and prisoner exchange were agreed. Along with the eunuch general Mu'nis al-Muzaffar, the two ambassadors went to the Lamos River, the customary site of prisoner exchanges, where the exchange took place in September/October.

== Sources ==
- Lilie, Ralph-Johannes; Ludwig, Claudia; Pratsch, Thomas; Zielke, Beate (2013). Prosopographie der mittelbyzantinischen Zeit Online. Berlin-Brandenburgische Akademie der Wissenschaften. Nach Vorarbeiten F. Winkelmanns erstellt (in German). Berlin and Boston: De Gruyter.
