= John Rhadenos =

Byzantine official and military leader

The patrikios John Rhadenos (Greek: Ἰωάννης Ῥαδηνός, also Ῥαδινός, Ῥωδινός in the sources; fl. 917–921/22) was a Byzantine official and military leader.

The surname Rhadenos derives from Rhade, a small village in the Anatolic Theme. He is probably to be identified with one of the two Byzantine ambassadors sent to the Abbasid court in Baghdad in June 917. Recorded in the Kitab al-'Uyun, the embassy was led by a man of about 40 years, probably Rhadenos, as well as the elderly Michael Toxaras and twenty attendants. The embassy arrived in Baghdad on 25 June and was received by the Caliph al-Muqtadir at the Taj Palace on 17 July, and a truce and prisoner exchange were agreed. Along with the eunuch general Mu'nis al-Muzaffar, the two ambassadors went to the Lamos River, the customary site of prisoner exchanges, where the exchange took place in September/October.

In c. 921/2, Rhadenos is mentioned as commander of the imperial fleet (droungarios tou ploimou), defeating a Saracen fleet, led by the renegade Leo of Tripolis, near Lemnos. The Byzantine victory was overwhelming, with most of the Saracen ships and crews lost, while Leo of Tripoli himself barely escaped with his life, and is no longer mentioned in the sources.

== Sources ==
- Lilie, Ralph-Johannes; Ludwig, Claudia; Pratsch, Thomas; Zielke, Beate (2013). Prosopographie der mittelbyzantinischen Zeit Online. Berlin-Brandenburgische Akademie der Wissenschaften. Nach Vorarbeiten F. Winkelmanns erstellt (in German). Berlin and Boston: De Gruyter.
