= Lamos =

Lamos may refer to:

- Lamos (river), a river in Cilicia, now called Limonlu Çayı in Mersin Province, Turkey
- Lamos (Cilicia), a town of ancient Cilicia and Isauria, Turkey
- Lamos (city), another ancient settlement and archaeological site in Cilicia, Turkey
- Lamos, a small river on the summit of Mount Helicon according to Pausanias
- Lamos, a son fathered on Omphale by Heracles according to Diodorus Siculus and Ovid
- Lamos, a name associated with Telepylus, the city of the Laestrygonians, in the Odyssey
- LAMOS (League Aiming to Menace and Overthrow Spies), a villainous organization in the television series Totally Spies!

== See also ==
- Lamus (disambiguation)
