= Bushra al-Thamali =

Bashir or Bushra al-Thamali (Arabic: بشرى الثملي, romanized: Bushrā al-Thamalī) was an Abbasid military commander and governor (wali or amir) of Tarsus and the borderlands with the Byzantine Empire in Cilicia (al-thughur al-Shamiya).

== Life ==
Bushra was a retainer (ghulam) of the long-time governor of Tarsus, and the borderlands with the Byzantine Empire in Cilicia, Thamal al-Dulafi.

In 925 he served as Thamal's deputy during the latter's absence in a campaign against the Qarmatians in Iraq. Along with the court eunuch Muflih he supervised the prisoner exchange with the Byzantines at the Lamos River in September–October 925.

By 938, he occupied the post the governor himself, and again supervised a prisoner exchange with the Byzantines, along with Ibn Warqa al-Shaybani. After 6,300 Muslims were exchanged for an equivalent number of Byzantines, the Byzantines still held 800 Muslim prisoners left, who were ransomed over the next six months at the Podandos river.

== Sources ==
- Lilie, Ralph-Johannes; Ludwig, Claudia; Pratsch, Thomas; Zielke, Beate (2013). Prosopographie der mittelbyzantinischen Zeit Online. Berlin-Brandenburgische Akademie der Wissenschaften. Nach Vorarbeiten F. Winkelmanns erstellt (in German). Berlin and Boston: De Gruyter.
- Stern, S. M. (1960). "The Coins of Thamal and of Other Governors of Tarsus". Journal of the American Oriental Society. 80 (3): 217–225. doi:10.2307/596170. JSTOR 596170.

Preceded by Thamal al-Dulafi	Governor of Tarsus c. 938	Unknown Title next held by Nasr al-Thamali
