= Lamus =

Lamus may refer to:

- Lamus River (Turkish: Limonlu Çayı)
- Lamus (city), ancient city on the river
- Lamus (Isauria), town of ancient Isauria
- Lamus (see), Catholic titular see
- Eduardo Cote Lamus (1928–1964), Colombian politician and poet
- Acrossocheilus lamus, a species of ray-finned fish

== See also ==
- Lamos (disambiguation)
- Lamu
