= Bishr al-Afshini =

Military commander and governor, Byzantine Empire (800s–900s CE)

Bishr al-Afshini (Arabic: بشر الأفشيني) was a military commander for the Abbasid Caliphate and the governor (wali) of Tarsus from 912/3 until at least 918.

== Life ==
According to al-Tabari, he was a eunuch and originally a servant of Muhammad ibn Abi'l-Saj, who was also nicknamed "Afshin". He first appears in summer 906, during a ceremony in which he was bestowed a robe of honour by Caliph al-Muktafi. A little later, in October 906, during the Qarmatian assault on Kufa, he is mentioned as one of the officers of the central caliphal army sent to the city's aid, but were routed before the city by the Qarmatian rebels.

In the year 912/3 he was appointed as governor of Tarsus and the Cilician borderlands (thughur) with the Byzantine Empire, succeeding Rustam ibn Baradu. In summer 914 he received the assistance of an army of 2,000 horsemen sent from Baghdad under Abu Umayr Adi ibn Ahmad ibn Abd al-Baqi for one of the customary summer raids (ṣā’ifa) into Byzantine territory, but the two commanders were unable to carry out the raid, instead postponing it until winter. In his report to the Caliph after the raid, Bishr claimed that he had captured no less than 150 Byzantine commanders and some 2,000 captives in all.

In autumn 917 he oversaw, along with the Abbasid commander-in-chief Mu'nis al-Muzaffar, a prisoner exchange with the Byzantines at the Lamos River. In 918, he launched another raid into Byzantine territory, capturing a few forts and taking booty.

He may also be identified with Bishr al-Khadim ("the Eunuch") who was named governor of Damascus and Aleppo in 933 and was killed in the same year by Muhammad ibn Tughj al-Ikhshid.

== Sources ==
- Lilie, Ralph-Johannes; Ludwig, Claudia; Pratsch, Thomas; Zielke, Beate (2013). Prosopographie der mittelbyzantinischen Zeit Online. Berlin-Brandenburgische Akademie der Wissenschaften. Nach Vorarbeiten F. Winkelmanns erstellt (in German). Berlin and Boston: De Gruyter.
- Rosenthal, Franz, ed. (1985). The History of al-Ṭabarī, Volume XXXVIII: The Return of the Caliphate to Baghdad: The Caliphates of al-Muʿtaḍid, al-Muktafī and al-Muqtadir, A.D. 892–915/A.H. 279–302. SUNY Series in Near Eastern Studies. Albany, New York: State University of New York Press. ISBN 978-0-87395-876-9.

Preceded by Rustam ibn Baradu	Governor of Tarsus; 912/3 – after 918	Unknown Title next held by Thamal al-Dulafi
