= Sack of Aleppo (962) =

Capture and destruction of the city in 962 CE

- Part of the Arab–Byzantine wars
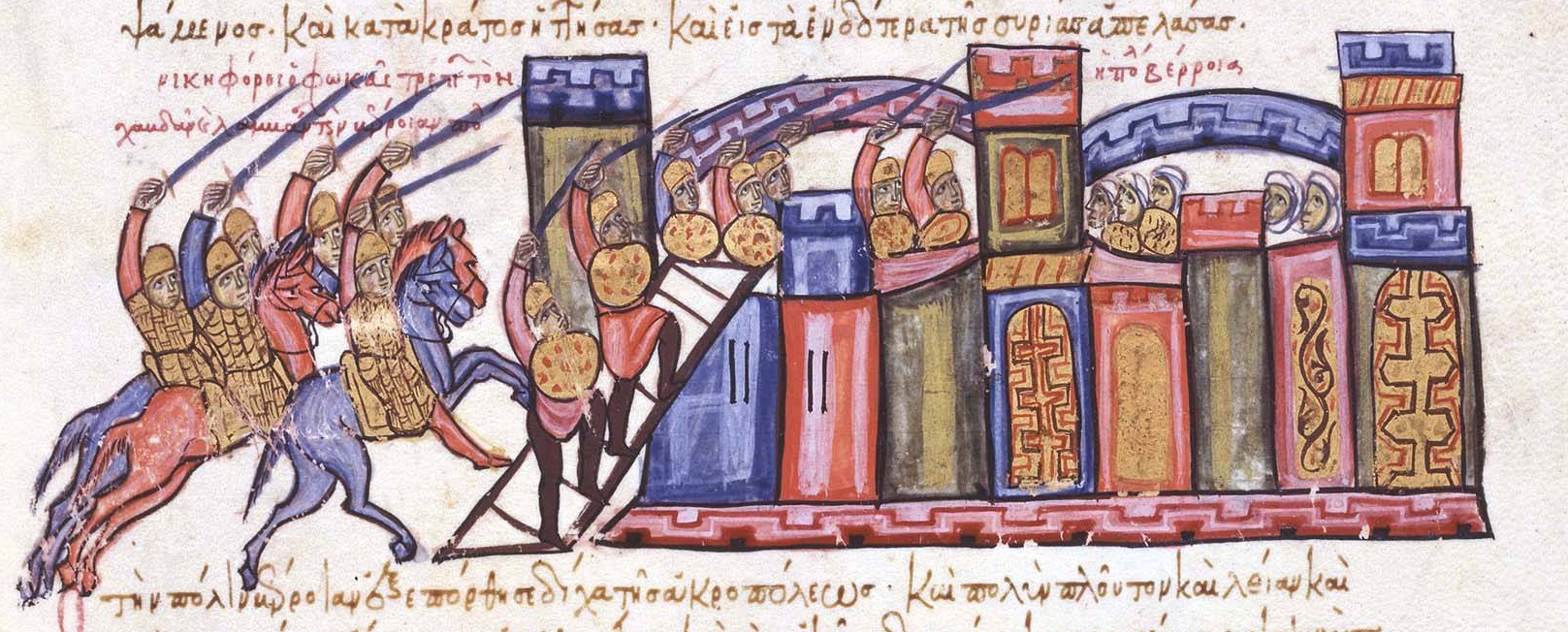
- Capture of Aleppo by the Byzantines, miniature from the Madrid Skylitzes
Date	24–31 December 962
Location	Aleppo, Hamdanid Emirate of Aleppo 36°12′N 37°9′E
Result	Byzantine victory: Sack of Aleppo

Belligerents
Hamdanid Dynasty	Byzantine Empire

Commanders and leaders
Sayf al-Dawla; Naja al-Kasaki	Nikephoros Phokas; John Tzimiskes; Theodore Parsakoutenos †

The sack of Aleppo in December 962 was a major victory carried out by the Byzantine Empire under Nikephoros Phokas. Aleppo was the capital of the Hamdanid emir Sayf al-Dawla, the Byzantines' chief antagonist at the time.

== Background ==
In October 944, the Hamdanid emir Sayf al-Dawla captured Aleppo and soon extended his control over northern Syria, from Homs in the south to the frontier lands with the Byzantine Empire in the northwest and parts of western Upper Mesopotamia. Under Sayf al-Dawla's patronage, Aleppo grew into the chief city of northern Syria, and was the site of major buildings, notably the great palace of Halbas outside Aleppo, endowed with splendid gardens and an aqueduct. The Hamdanid court of Aleppo also became a major centre of cultural activity; as the historian Stephen Humphreys comments, at this time "Aleppo could certainly have held its own with any court in Renaissance Italy".

Due to the geographical position of his realm, the Hamdanid ruler also emerged as the champion of the Muslim world against the recent advances of the Christian Byzantines in the eastern Anatolian borderlands. From 945/6 until the end of his life, he was said to have fought against the Byzantines in over forty battles. The first decade of warfare with the Byzantines was largely in Sayf al-Dawla's favour, with the Hamdanid ruler able to parry the Byzantine attacks and launch counter-raids of his own, resulting in the dismissal of the Byzantine Domestic of the Schools (commander-in-chief), Bardas Phokas, and his replacement with his son, Nikephoros Phokas. Assisted by capable lieutenants such as his brother Leo and nephew John Tzimiskes, Nikephoros began to turn the tide of the conflict. In 960, trying to take advantage of Nikephoros' absence with the bulk of his army in the reconquest of Crete, Sayf al-Dawla launched a major invasion of Byzantine Cappadocia, but was attacked and almost annihilated in an ambush by Leo Phokas. Sayf al-Dawla managed to escape, but most modern historians consider that his military power was broken.

== Nikephoros' 962 campaign and the sack of Aleppo ==
Map of the Arab–Byzantine frontier zone in south-eastern Asia Minor, with the major fortresses.

In 961, Nikephoros returned and led his troops to sack the town of Anazarbus in Cilicia, killing a part of its population and expelling the rest, and then demolishing its walls. Modern historians have seen this as a deliberate scorched-earth strategy that "created a wasteland between Syria and Cilicia that broke the lines of supply between the two regions", and that opened up the road to Aleppo. Indeed, when he resumed his campaign in April 962, Nikephoros ignored Cilicia, and instead attacked Marash, Sisium, Duluk and Manbij, thereby securing the western passes over the Anti-Taurus Mountains. Sayf al-Dawla appears to have been oblivious to this threat: instead, he sent his generals, Qarghuyah and Naja al-Kasaki, to conduct counter-raids into Byzantine territory, while he tried to restore his authority in Cilicia and rebuild Anazarbus. Negotiations for a truce and a prisoner exchange may have been ongoing at the same time, lulling the Hamdanids into complacency.

This illusion was broken in November, when a Byzantine force captured Manbij, the last city north of Aleppo, capturing its governor, Sayf al-Dawla's cousin Abu Firas al-Hamdani. Early in December, Nikephoros—likely in command of a different army than that which had captured Manbij—moved onto Aleppo itself. The Arab sources dwell extensively on the following events, but provide contradictory details, so that the exact course of the campaign is uncertain. They are unanimous, however, that the attack caught Sayf al-Dawla completely off guard, possibly due to the late season, as the Byzantines did not normally campaign in winter. As a result, the Byzantines held a considerable numerical advantage—Arab sources speak of 70,000 Byzantines against just 4,000 Hamdanid soldiers in the city—leaving Sayf al-Dawla scrambling to bolster his forces with last-minute levies.

As the Byzantines advanced on the city, the Hamdanids tried to oppose them, but their reaction appears to have been uncoordinated and confused: Sayf al-Dawla moved to Azaz to confront the Byzantine army, but then retreated without doing so, while his lieutenant Naja moved first towards Antioch and then back towards Azaz, where he was defeated by Nikephoros' lieutenant, Tzimiskes. Whatever the exact course of events, the Byzantines emerged victorious from these initial skirmishes, and proceeded to attack Aleppo.

Sayf al-Dawla briefly confronted the Byzantine army with the small force at his disposal before his capital, but, unable to offer any meaningful resistance, he abandoned the city. The Hamdanid ruler fled to the fortress of Balis, but, pursued by Tzimiskes, he moved on to nearby Sab'in. Naja's movements are not entirely clear, but he likewise failed to come to the support of Aleppo. The Byzantines first plundered the unprotected palace of Halbas, securing enormous plunder, including its golden roof; the rest of the building was then torn down. Left without hope of relief, the Aleppines began negotiations, but as the city collapsed into chaos, Nikephoros took advantage and ordered his men to storm it on 23/24 December. The Byzantines did not capture the citadel, which was defended by a Daylamite garrison, but plundered the city for eight or nine days, torching its buildings and tearing down its fortifications. Yahya of Antioch reports that the citadel was attacked by a nephew of Nikephoros Phokas (possibly Theodore Parsakoutenos), but he was killed by a Daylamite soldier. When his severed head was brought to Phokas, the latter reportedly beheaded 1,200 Arab prisoners.

Eventually, the Byzantines departed, taking some 10,000 inhabitants, mostly young men, with them as captives; in addition, they took possession of 390,000 silver dinars, 2,000 camels and 1,400 mules. Returning to his ruined and half-deserted capital, Sayf al-Dawla repopulated it with refugees from Qinnasrin.

== Aftermath ==
Ibn Hawqal visited the city after the siege, then he wrote:

The Greeks took the city and its stone wall was of no avail to it. They ruined the Mosque, and took away captive all its women and children, and burnt the houses. Halab had a castle, but it was not a strong place and was in no way well built. All the population had fled up to it (to take refuge from the Greeks) and here most of them perished with all their goods and chattels.

—

Some modern scholars have considered the sack of Aleppo as a mere setback for the Hamdanid ruler, but not ultimately critical for his realm, focusing rather on the conquest of Cilicia that followed in 963–965. Garrood, on the other hand, suggests that the loss of prestige suffered by Sayf al-Dawla was an irreversible blow on his power and authority. From then on, until his death, Sayf al-Dawla's rule would be plagued by revolts and disputes between his subordinates.

== Sources ==
- Bianquis, Thierry (1997). "Sayf al-Dawla". In Bosworth, C. E.; van Donzel, E.; Heinrichs, W. P. & Lecomte, G. (eds.). The Encyclopaedia of Islam, Second Edition. Volume IX: San–Sze. Leiden: E. J. Brill. pp. 103–110. ISBN 978-90-04-10422-8.
- Burns, Ross (2017). Aleppo: A History (Cities of the Ancient World). Routledge. ISBN 978-0-415-73721-0.
- Garrood, William (2008). "The Byzantine Conquest of Cilicia and the Hamdanids of Aleppo, 959–965". Anatolian Studies. 58: 127–140. doi:10.1017/s006615460000870x. ISSN 0066-1546. JSTOR 20455416. S2CID 162596738.
- Humphreys, Stephen (2010). "Syria". In Robinson, Charles F. (ed.). The New Cambridge History of Islam, Volume I: The Formation of the Islamic World, Sixth to Eleventh Centuries. Cambridge and New York: Cambridge University Press. pp. 506–540. ISBN 978-0-521-83823-8.
- Kaldellis, Anthony (2017). Streams of Gold, Rivers of Blood: The Rise and Fall of Byzantium, 955 A.D. to the First Crusade. Oxford University Press. ISBN 978-0-1902-5322-6.
- Kennedy, Hugh (2004) [1986]. The Prophet and the Age of the Caliphates: The Islamic Near East from the 6th to the 11th Century (Second ed.). Harlow: Longman. ISBN 978-0-582-40525-7.
- Lilie, Ralph-Johannes; Ludwig, Claudia; Pratsch, Thomas; Zielke, Beate (2013). Prosopographie der mittelbyzantinischen Zeit Online. Berlin-Brandenburgische Akademie der Wissenschaften. Nach Vorarbeiten F. Winkelmanns erstellt (in German). Berlin and Boston: De Gruyter.
- Treadgold, Warren (1997). A History of the Byzantine State and Society. Stanford, California: Stanford University Press. ISBN 0-8047-2630-2.
- Whittow, Mark (1996). The Making of Byzantium, 600–1025. Berkeley and Los Angeles, California: University of California Press. ISBN 978-0-520-20496-6.
