= Ahmad ibn Tughan al-Ujayfi =

Ahmad ibn Tughan al-Ujayfi (Arabic: أحمد بن توغان العجيفي) was the Egyptian governor of Tarsus, Antioch, and the Abbasid Caliphate's borderlands in Cilicia (al-thughur al-Shamiya) for the semi-autonomous Tulunid dynasty from 891 to 896.

== Life ==
Ahmad ibn Tughan al-Ujayfi appears for the first time in 891, during the governorship of Yazaman al-Khadim in Tarsus. In the previous year, Yazaman had acknowledged the suzerainty of the Tulunid ruler Khumarawayh against that of the Abbasid central government under the regent al-Muwaffaq. According to al-Tabari, Ahmad arrived at Tarsus on 4 October 891 and took part in the summer expedition (ṣā’ifa) against the Byzantine border fortress of Salandu (Selinus/Traianopolis), where Yazaman was mortally wounded, dying on the next day (23 October). According to Ibn al-Athir, "Ibn Ujayf" (Ahmad) succeeded Yazaman as governor of Tarsus and was confirmed by Khumarawayh, although a certain Ibn Abi Isa, who was also a commander in the expedition against Salandu, may have held the post briefly as an interim governor.

Soon after, however, he was replaced as governor of Tarsus by Muhammad ibn Musa al-A'raj. The latter did not remain in the post for long, as he was deposed and seized in August 892 in an uprising of the populace of Tarsus, angry at a Tulunid attempt to imprison the local magnate Raghib and confiscate his property. Khumarawayh was forced to back down, and sent Raghib back to the city, along with Ahmad, who was once more named its governor. They arrived in the city on 7 November 892. S. M. Stern suggests that perhaps the "al-Ujayfi" or "Ibn Ujayf" who appears as governor of Tarsus during this period was a different person from Ahmad ibn Tughan, who may have been the governor of the wider borderlands rather than Tarsus alone. Modern literature however generally considers them to have been the same person.

In September 893, Ahmad al-Ujayfi along with Ahmad ibn Abba and Badr al-Hammami led an expedition against the Byzantines, reaching as far as al-Balaqsun (unidentified, possibly Carian or Lycian Telmessos). In September 896, he supervised the prisoner exchange with the Byzantines on the Lamos River, which began on 16 September and lasted for twelve days, leading to the ransoming of 2,504 Muslim men, women and children according to al-Tabari, while al-Mas'udi variously numbers the exchanged prisoners as 2,495 or 3,000. At this time, al-Mas'udi names Ahmad as "commander of the Syrian borderlands and of Antioch".

In October, after the exchange was concluded, Ahmad left Tarsus by sea, leaving the Byzantine renegade Damian of Tarsus (a former servant of Yazaman) in his place as governor of Tarsus. Later, in March/April 897, he sent Yusuf ibn al-Baghimardi to Tarsus, either to replace or to reinforce Damian.

== Sources ==
- Fields, Philip M., ed. (1987). The History of al-Ṭabarī, Volume XXXVII: The ʿAbbāsid Recovery: The War Against the Zanj Ends, A.D. 879–893/A.H. 266–279. SUNY Series in Near Eastern Studies. Albany, New York: State University of New York Press. ISBN 978-0-88706-054-0.
- Lilie, Ralph-Johannes; Ludwig, Claudia; Pratsch, Thomas; Zielke, Beate (2013). Prosopographie der mittelbyzantinischen Zeit Online. Berlin-Brandenburgische Akademie der Wissenschaften. Nach Vorarbeiten F. Winkelmanns erstellt (in German). Berlin and Boston: De Gruyter.
- Rosenthal, Franz, ed. (1985). The History of al-Ṭabarī, Volume XXXVIII: The Return of the Caliphate to Baghdad: The Caliphates of al-Muʿtaḍid, al-Muktafī and al-Muqtadir, A.D. 892–915/A.H. 279–302. SUNY Series in Near Eastern Studies. Albany, New York: State University of New York Press. ISBN 978-0-87395-876-9.
- Stern, S. M. (1960). "The Coins of Thamal and of Other Governors of Tarsus". Journal of the American Oriental Society. 80 (3): 217–225. doi:10.2307/596170. JSTOR 596170.

Preceded by Yazaman al-Khadim	Governor of Tarsus; October 891 – before summer 892	Succeeded by Muhammad ibn Musa al-A'raj
Preceded by Muhammad ibn Musa al-A'raj	Governor of Tarsus; November 892 – October 896	Succeeded by Damian of Tarsus
