= Muflih =

Muflih can refer to:

- Muflih (eunuch) (fl. 923–925), chief black eunuch of the Abbasid caliph al-Muqtadir
- Muflih al-Turki (died 872), Abbasid general
- Muflih al-Saji (fl. 929–935), governor of Adharbayjan
