= Thamal al-Dulafi =

Abbasid governor of Tarsus (923–932)

Thamal al-Dulafi (Arabic: ثمل الدلفي, romanized: Thamal al-Dulafī; fl. 917/8–932) was an Abbasid military commander and longtime governor (wali or amir) of Tarsus and the borderlands with the Byzantine Empire in Cilicia (al-thughur al-Shamiya). A former Dulafid slave, he commanded several successful raiding expeditions, mostly by sea, against the Byzantines, but also against the Fatimids in Egypt and against the Qarmatians in Iraq.

== Life ==
Thamal was a eunuch, and, as his nisba of "al-Dulafi" indicates, began his career as a slave (ghulam) of the autonomous Dulafid dynasty of Jibal, which was suppressed by the Abbasid caliph al-Mu'tadid in 896. He is first mentioned in 917/8, when he was appointed by the Abbasid caliph as commander of a naval expedition against the Byzantine Empire. He led his fleet to a successful raid, returning with prisoners and booty, while the governor of Tarsus, Bishr al-Afshini, led the year's overland raid.

In 920, he led his fleet of 25 ships to Egypt, where he participated in the repulsion of a Fatimid invasion. His arrival prevented the Fatimid ships from entering the Rosetta branch of the Nile, and on 12 March, near Abukir, he inflicted a crushing defeat on the Fatimid fleet, whose vessels were driven to the shore by the wind. Most of the Fatimid crews were either killed or captured. In spring 921, Thamal and his fleet sailed to Alexandria, captured by the Fatimids in 919. The fleet entered the city's harbour and after a fight drove out its Fatimid garrison, while the populace was evacuated to Rosetta as a precaution. He then joined with the rest of the army under the Abbasid commander-in-chief Mu'nis al-Muzaffar to blockade the Fayyum Oasis, where the remaining Fatimid forces had withdrawn, and forced them to burn their equipment and retreat westwards over the desert.

Map of the Arab–Byzantine frontier zone in southeastern Asia Minor

In 923, while Mu'nis al-Muzaffar led the land raid against the Byzantines, Thamal once more led the seaborne expedition, which allegedly made 1,000 prisoners and took much plunder, including over 28,000 animals. By this time, he had apparently already been appointed as governor of Tarsus. In 924, according to al-Mas'udi, he led his fleet, augmented by Syrian and Egyptian ships, to the vicinity of Constantinople itself. There he made contact with the Bulgarians and agreed joint action in Tsar Simeon's war against the Byzantines; some of the Bulgarians even returned with Thamal to Tarsus, although nothing further is known to have come of this. However, in 924–926 he left the borderlands and went to Iraq, where he participated in the fighting against the Qarmatians. During his absence, Tarsus was governed by his lieutenant Bushra, who along with the eunuch Muflih also supervised the prisoner exchange with the Byzantines in September–October 925.

Having returned to Tarsus in late 926/early 927, he led the summer raid against the Byzantines in 927. During the campaign Thamal defeated a Byzantine army, and during his return defeated the Kurdish leader Ibn al-Dahhak, who had renounced Islam and entered Byzantine service. Thamal returned to Tarsus in December 927/January 928. In March/April 931, according to Ibn al-Athir, he embarked on a raiding expedition in March/April. The campaign was hampered by the weather—his horses reportedly sank in snow up to the breast—but Thamal defeated a Byzantine force, killing 600 and capturing 3,000 soldiers and taking much booty. Immediately after his return to Tarsus in July/August, he left for the main summer expedition, which reached as far as Amorium, which was abandoned by its garrison and plundered by the Muslims. Thamal then led his men up to Ancyra, before returning to Tarsus in September/October. The women and children caught during this raid reportedly fetched 136,000 gold dinars on the slave market. In the next year his raid was successful enough that letters declaring "victories on land and on sea" were read in the Baghdad mosques.

Thamal is no longer mentioned after this, unless he can be identified with "al-Thamali" who led a raid in 941/2. The latter however is most likely one of Thamal's retainers (ghilman), who remained a powerful force in Tarsus and the thughur for some time to come: Thamal's lieutenant Bushra succeeded him as governor, followed a few years later by another of his ghilman, Nasr al-Thamali; while the Thamaliyya ("men of Thamal") are mentioned as a faction in 938, when they killed their rival Tarif. Thamal's ghilman are attested in Tarsus during the subsequent Hamdanid period as well, as late as the mid-960s.

== Sources ==
- Bosworth, C. E. (1992). "The City of Tarsus and the Arab-Byzantine Frontiers in Early and Middle ʿAbbāsid Times". Oriens. 33: 268–286. doi:10.1163/1877837292X00105. ISSN 0078-6527. JSTOR 1580607.
- Halm, Heinz (1996). The Empire of the Mahdi: The Rise of the Fatimids. Handbook of Oriental Studies. Vol. 26. Translated by Michael Bonner. Leiden: BRILL. ISBN 9004100563. Archived from the original on 2024-11-10.
- Kennedy, Hugh (2004) [1986]. The Prophet and the Age of the Caliphates: The Islamic Near East from the 6th to the 11th Century (Second ed.). Harlow: Longman. ISBN 978-0-582-40525-7.
- Lilie, Ralph-Johannes; Ludwig, Claudia; Pratsch, Thomas; Zielke, Beate (2013). Prosopographie der mittelbyzantinischen Zeit Online. Berlin-Brandenburgische Akademie der Wissenschaften. Nach Vorarbeiten F. Winkelmanns erstellt (in German). Berlin and Boston: De Gruyter.
- Stern, S. M. (1960). "The Coins of Thamal and of Other Governors of Tarsus". Journal of the American Oriental Society. 80 (3): 217–225. doi:10.2307/596170. JSTOR 596170.

Preceded by Bishr al-Afshini	Governor of Tarsus before 923 – ca. 932	Unknown Title next held by Bushra al-Thamali
