= Rashiq al-Nasimi =

Last Arab governor of Tarsus (962–965)

Rashiq al-Nasimi رشيق النسيمي

Governor of Tarsus
- In office 962–965
- Preceded by: Ibn az-Zayyat
- Succeeded by: Byzantines control of Tarsus
- Military career
- Service years: c. 962 – 965
- Conflicts: Arab-Byzantine war of 964–965

Rashiq al-Nasimi (Arabic: رشيق النسيمي) was the governor of Tarsus for the Hamdanid emir Sayf al-Dawla and Abbasid caliph from 962 until the city's surrender to the Byzantine emperor Nikephoros II Phokas in 965. He then took over Antioch, and launched a failed attack on the Hamdanid capital, Aleppo in early 966. He took the lower city and besieged the citadel for over three months, but was killed and his men fled back to Antioch.

== Life ==
Rashiq is first mentioned in late 961, as commanding a Tarsian army sent to confront the invasion of the Byzantines under the command of Nikephoros Phokas, who were besieging Ayn Zarba. Rashiq tried to break the siege, but was defeated with heavy loss: according to Yahya of Antioch, 5,000 Tarsians fell and 4,000 were taken prisoner, while Rashiq managed to flee. As a result, Ayn Zarba surrendered (December 961/January 962). Then the governor of Tarsus, Ibn az-Zayyat, who had tried to break free from Hamdanid control, confronted the Byzantines but was also defeated. The Tarsians turned once more to Sayf al-Dawla for protection from the Byzantines, and Ibn az-Zayyat committed suicide, whereupon Sayf al-Dawla appointed Rashiq as his successor.

In 963, Rashiq led a summer raid (ṣā’ifa) into Byzantine territory, and captured the Byzantine commander of Heraclea (possibly to be identified with Eustathios Maleinos). Such feats were not able to change the tide of the conflict, however. Following the sack of Sayf al-Dawla's own residence, Aleppo, in December 962, the Byzantines under Nikephoros Phokas, who became emperor in 963, firmly held the upper hand, while the Hamdanid ruler, whose prestige was sorely shaken by the sack of his capital, was debilitated by internal revolts. Having already diminished the military strength of Tarsus by his previous victories, the removal of the Hamdanid threat allowed Nikephoros to concentrate on the conquest of Cilicia: Adana fell in 963, while al-Masissa (Mopsuestia, modern Misis) was attacked in 964 and the Byzantines raided widely across the region. Cyprus was taken by a Byzantine fleet in early 965, while in the summer, Nikephoros moved his army once more against al-Masissa, which capitulated on 13 July. Tarsus was next, and after a brief siege, the city surrendered on 16 August.

Rashiq fled to Antioch, where he managed to exploit the power vacuum to become governor and launch an attack on Aleppo, although the sources differ on the exact course of events. According to the hagiography of Patriarch Christopher of Antioch, he promised tribute and hostages to Nikephoros, while gaining the support of the populace. Along with the Hamdanid tax official al-Hasan ibn al-Ahwazi, he then ousted Sayf al-Dawla's appointed governor, Abu Thamal Fath al-Yamki. Ibn Shaddad on the other hand reports that it was Ibn al-Ahwazi who incited Rashiq to revolt, and that the latter played a double game, promising tribute both to Sayf al-Dawla and Nikephoros Phokas. Sayf al-Dawla accepted his offer of an annual sum of 600,000 dirhams, but, citing the imminence of the Byzantine threat, Rashiq deposed the governor Abu Thamal, seized control of the city (October 965) and offered the money promised to Sayf al-Dawla to the Byzantine emperor instead. All sources agree that Rashiq's coup was followed by a treaty between the Antiochenes and Nikephoros, which obliged the former to pay an annual tribute. Rashiq then (on 31 January 966, according to Ibn Shaddad) launched an attack on Aleppo. His troops and the Hamdanid loyalists under Qarghuyah gave many battles, but Rashiq succeeded in capturing the lower city and laid siege to the citadel for three months and ten days, until he was killed in a skirmish and his men fled back towards Antioch.

== Sources ==
- Garrood, William (2008). "The Byzantine Conquest of Cilicia and the Hamdanids of Aleppo, 959–965". Anatolian Studies. 58. British Institute at Ankara: 127–140. doi:10.1017/s006615460000870x. ISSN 0066-1546. JSTOR 20455416. S2CID 162596738.
- Lilie, Ralph-Johannes; Ludwig, Claudia; Pratsch, Thomas; Zielke, Beate (2013). Prosopographie der mittelbyzantinischen Zeit Online. Berlin-Brandenburgische Akademie der Wissenschaften. Nach Vorarbeiten F. Winkelmanns erstellt (in German). Berlin and Boston: De Gruyter.

Preceded by Ibn az-Zayyat	Governor of Tarsus; 962–965	Byzantine conquest of Cilicia
