= Abu'l-Asha'ir Ahmad ibn Nasr =

Military commander

- Map of the Arab–Byzantine frontier zone in the 8th–10th centuries
- Died: November 2, 906; Al-Aqaba, Iraq (30.140166°N 43.620192°E)
- Military career
- Allegiance: Abbasid Caliphate
- Rank: Commander

Abu'l-Asha'ir Ahmad ibn Nasr (Arabic: أبو الأشاعر أحمد بن نصر) (died 2 November 906) was a military commander for the Abbasid Caliphate and the governor of Tarsus from March 903 to August 905.

== Life ==
Abu'l-Asha'ir was appointed to the post of governor (wali or amir) of Tarsus and of the Cilician border zone (ath-thughur ash-Shamiya) with the Byzantine Empire on 22 March 903, succeeding Muzaffar ibn Hajj. He set out from Baghdad on 12 May in direction of the border, accompanied by troops as well as by gifts from Caliph al-Muktafi to the Byzantine emperor Leo VI the Wise.

In late summer or autumn of 904, he mediated for the conclusion of a truce and a prisoner exchange with the Byzantines, to take place in the next year. In the meantime, however, the Byzantine general Andronikos Doukas invaded Arab territory and sacked Marash (Germanikeia), leading to Abu'l-Asha'ir's dismissal and replacement by Rustam ibn Baradu.

In 906 Abu'l-Asha'ir was killed when his pilgrimage caravan was attacked by Qarmatians at al-Aqaba along the Mecca Road.

== Sources ==
- Lilie, Ralph-Johannes; Ludwig, Claudia; Pratsch, Thomas; Zielke, Beate (2013). Prosopographie der mittelbyzantinischen Zeit Online. Berlin-Brandenburgische Akademie der Wissenschaften. Nach Vorarbeiten F. Winkelmanns erstellt (in German). Berlin and Boston: De Gruyter.
- Rosenthal, Franz, ed. (1985). The History of al-Ṭabarī, Volume XXXVIII: The Return of the Caliphate to Baghdad: The Caliphates of al-Muʿtaḍid, al-Muktafī and al-Muqtadir, A.D. 892–915/A.H. 279–302. SUNY Series in Near Eastern Studies. Albany, New York: State University of New York Press. ISBN 978-0-87395-876-9.
- Stern, S. M. (1960). "The Coins of Thamal and of Other Governors of Tarsus". Journal of the American Oriental Society. 80 (3): 217–225. doi:10.2307/596170. JSTOR 596170.

Preceded by Muzaffar ibn Hajj	Governor of Tarsus; 903–905	Succeeded by Rustam ibn Baradu
