= Rustam ibn Baradu =

Military commander for the Abbasid Caliphate

Rustam ibn Baradu (Arabic: رستم بن بردو) or Rustum ibn Bardu, surnamed al-Farghani ("from Farghana"), was a military commander for the Abbasid Caliphate and the governor (wali) of Tarsus from August 905 to 912/3.

== Life ==
Map of the Arab–Byzantine frontier zone in the 8th–10th centuries

Rustam was appointed to the post of governor of Tarsus and of the Cilician border zone (al-thughur al-Shamiya) with the Byzantine Empire on 20 August 905. In this capacity he supervised a prisoner exchange with the Byzantines on the Lamos River soon after. The exchange had already been arranged by his predecessor, Abu'l-Asa'ir Ahmad ibn Nasr, and began on 27 September, but was interrupted after four days after only about 1,200 Arab prisoners had been exchanged, with the Arabs blaming the Byzantines for violating the truce terms.

In late October 906, he accompanied the general Ahmad ibn Kayghalagh in an invasion of Byzantine territory. The Abbasid army captured the town of Salandu (Selinus) and advanced even up to the Halys River, where they met and defeated a Byzantine force, capturing 5,000 prisoners according to al-Tabari. At about this time (ca. 905/907), he concluded a written treaty with the Byzantine envoy Leo Choirosphaktes, according to which the two sides would continue fighting for two more years but conclude a truce and carry out a prisoner exchange on the third.

When the Byzantine general Andronikos Doukas, falling victim to the machinations of the eunuch Samonas and facing charges of insubordination against emperor Leo VI the Wise, sought refuge in the fortress of Kabala, the emperor sent the general Gregoras Iberitzes to convince Andronikos and his relatives and followers to surrender, but the latter sought the aid of the Arabs of Tarsus. Rustam left Tarsus in February/March 907 with his troops. He reached Kabala, bringing back both Andronikos and his son Constantine Doukas to Arab territory, and torched Iconium on his way.

In summer 908, Rustam supervised another prisoner exchange at the Lamos River, with ca. 2,800–3,000 Muslim men and women ransomed. He is last mentioned in 911/12, when, alongside the Byzantine renegade Damian of Tarsus, he led an unsuccessful siege of the stronghold of the Armenian military leader Melias, who had entered Byzantine service in the Abbasid–Byzantine borderlands. Eventually, the two Muslim commanders broke off the siege and instead raided the suburbs of the fortress of Kyzistra. He was succeeded in 912/3 by Bishr al-Afshini.

== Sources ==
- Lilie, Ralph-Johannes; Ludwig, Claudia; Pratsch, Thomas; Zielke, Beate (2013). Prosopographie der mittelbyzantinischen Zeit Online. Berlin-Brandenburgische Akademie der Wissenschaften. Nach Vorarbeiten F. Winkelmanns erstellt (in German). Berlin and Boston: De Gruyter.
- Rosenthal, Franz, ed. (1985). The History of al-Ṭabarī, Volume XXXVIII: The Return of the Caliphate to Baghdad: The Caliphates of al-Muʿtaḍid, al-Muktafī and al-Muqtadir, A.D. 892–915/A.H. 279–302. SUNY Series in Near Eastern Studies. Albany, New York: State University of New York Press. ISBN 978-0-87395-876-9.
- Tougher, Shaun (1997). The Reign of Leo VI (886-912): Politics and People. Leiden; New York; Köln: Brill. ISBN 9004108114.

Preceded by Abu'l-Asa'ir Ahmad ibn Nasr	Governor of Tarsus; 905–912/3	Succeeded by Bishr al-Afshini
