= Battle of the Cilician Gates (807) =

- Part of the Arab–Byzantine wars
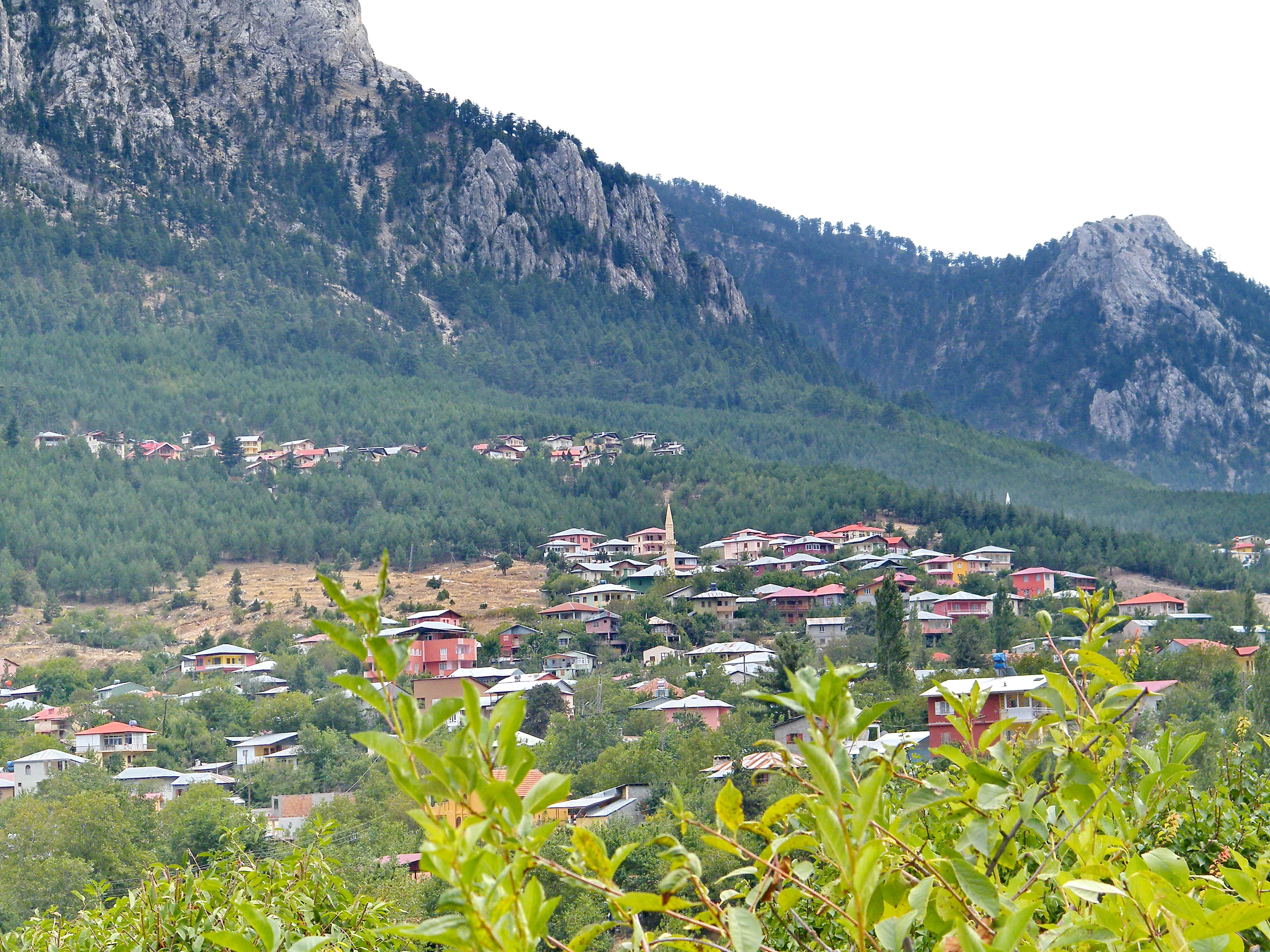
- Modern view of the Gülek Pass near Adana
Date	Spring 807 AD
Location	Cilician Gates (modern Gülek Pass, Turkey)
Result	Byzantine victory

Belligerents
Byzantine Empire	Abbasid Caliphate

Commanders and leaders
Unknown	Yazid ibn Makhlad al-Hubayri al-Fazari †

Strength
Unknown (Note: The Byzantine army which defeated the Abbasids in 807 was drawn from the Anatolikon theme, which had a maximum strength of 18,000 men in the early 9th century (Treadgold 1988 p.353). However, as paper strengths were rarely realised in practice and many of these men would always be occupied in garrison duties or had detachments drawn from them for Nikephoros' Balkan Campaign in 807, the number of Anatolics in the field at Cilician Gates was certainly far below 18,000)	10,000

Casualties and losses
Unknown	Heavy

The Battle of the Cilician Gates in 807 was a military confrontation between a Byzantine army and an invading Abbasid force attempting to cross the Taurus Mountains. The battle resulted in a victory for the Byzantines, which prompted further incursions by the Abbasids.

== Background ==
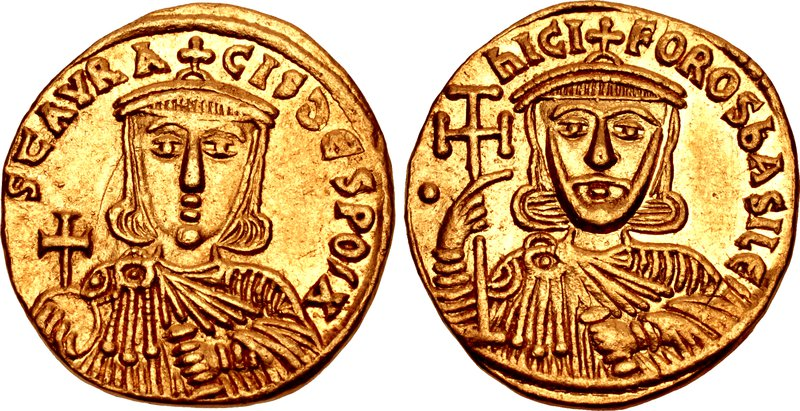
Golden solidus depicting the busts of Emperor Nikephoros I and his son Staurakios

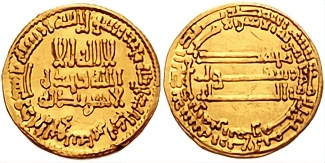
Golden dinar of Caliph Harun al-Rashid

Since his ascension to the Byzantine throne in 802, Emperor Nikephoros I had been in conflict with the Abbasid Caliphate, helmed by the Caliph Harun al-Rashid. Though Nikephoros had attained some successes, the Abbasids maintained a strategic advantage in their conflicts with Byzantium during the first years of his reign. In 806, Harun commanded a massive expedition into Asia Minor in person, as a retaliation for Byzantine raids and the capture of Tarsus in the previous year, which led to the sack of Herakleia, the imposition of a tribute payment from Nikephoros, and the promise not to rebuild destroyed forts in exchange for the withdrawal of Harun and his army. However, soon after the Abbasids left Asia Minor, Nikephoros violated the terms of the peace by rebuilding and refortifying fortresses along the frontier. The emperor also withheld the payments agreed upon in the terms of the peace settlement.

== Battle ==
When news of Nikephoros' breach of the treaty reached Harun, the caliph became enraged and organised an Abbasid force to conduct a raid into Anatolia from the direction of Cilicia. The assembled troops amounted to a moderately sized army of over 10,000 men, and the veteran Abbasid general Yazid ibn Makhlad al-Hubayri al-Fazari, who had conducted very successful raiding operations in Anatolia during Harun's campaign the previous year, was designated its overall commander. Despite the size of this force being smaller than many of those previously assembled against Byzantium, the Abbasids may have been emboldened by the absence of Nikephoros' tagmatic and many of the thematic troops from the eastern front, as the emperor was conducting a campaign in the Haemus against the Slavs and Bulgarians. Yazid led his army out from Tarsus in spring 807, intending to enter Asia Minor through the Cilician Gates.

When the Abbasids reached the Gates however, they found a Byzantine force prepared to block their entry. The army arrayed against them consisted of men drawn from the Anatolikon Theme, who had prepared a rigid defence in the narrow confines of the mountain pass. Yazid attacked the Byzantines in an attempt to break through, but they held their ground. In the ensuing fighting, the Abbasids were soundly defeated with large portions of their army falling in battle, with Yazid himself being amongst those killed.

== Aftermath ==
As a response to this defeat, Caliph Harun planned a larger attack into Asia Minor later in 807. The Abbasids drew 30,000 troops from Khurasan, commanded by Harthama bin A'yan. While Harun visited Hadath, for what was to be his final visit to the Al-Thughur frontier, Harthama invaded Anatolia. Another Abbasid force under the command of Sa‘īd bin Salm bin Qutayba was also stationed near Germanikeia. However, he too was confronted by Byzantine forces, this time consisting of the imperial field army under the command of Emperor Nikephoros himself. The Abbasid and Byzantine armies clashed in a battle, but neither side was able to gain the upper hand. Ultimately both armies withdrew following the inconclusive fighting, with the Abbasids having to turn back without acquiring plunder as was the custom in sawa'if attacks. (Note: The anonymous author off Kitab al-'Uyun described this encounter as an Abbasid victory, but the fact Harthama was forced to terminate his Sawa'if invasion after this battle and the dire state of Abbasid supply lines during his withdrawal has led Warren Treadgold to doubt this assessment) Shortly after Harthama's retreat, the Abbasids faced a further reversal when a Byzantine force launched a counter invasion into Arab territories there, forcing Sa‘īd bin Salm bin Qutayba to retreat inside Germanikeia, before pillaging the surrounding regions. The Byzantines retired to Asia minor, taking large numbers of Arab soldiers and civilians back with them as captives.

Alarmed by these incursions, Harun dispatched Muhammad bin Yazid bin Mazyad to reinforce Tarsus. The caliph himself remained at Hadath until August, before departing the Al-Thughur for the final time and retiring to Al-Raqqah. As Harun was concerned that the Christian inhabitants of the Abbasid Al-Thughur could collude with the Byzantines, he ordered the persecution of these populations and adopted a policy of destruction of churches in the region. However, Harun was unable to organize another major expedition to bring the Byzantines to heel due to administrative issues which had emerged in distant Khurasan, and he departed for these territories in November 807.

== Bibliography ==
- Treadgold, Warren (1988). The Byzantine Revival, 780–842.
- Bonner, Michael David (1996). Aristocratic violence and holy war: studies in the jihad and the Arab-Byzantine frontier. American Oriental Society. ISBN 978-0-940490-11-6.
- Canard, Marius (1962). "La prise d'Héraclée et les relations entre Hārūn ar-Rashīd et l'empereur Nicéphore Ier" [The Capture of Heraclea and the Relations Between Harun ar-Rashid and the Emperor Nikephoros I]. Byzantion (in French). 32 (32): 345–379. ISSN 0378-2506. JSTOR 44170050.
