= Damian of Tarsus =

Damian of Tarsus (Greek: Δαμιανός ό Ταρσεύς, Arabic: دميانه الطرسوسي, romanized: Damyanah al-Tarsusi; died 924), surnamed Ghulam Yazman ("slave/page of Yazman"), was a Byzantine Greek convert to Islam, governor of Tarsus in 896–897 and one of the main leaders of naval raids against the Eastern Roman Empire in the early 10th century.

== Biography ==
Damian was a convert servant of the eunuch governor of Tarsus Yazman al-Khadim (died 891), who had recognized the overlordship of the Tulunids of Egypt under Ibn Tulun's son Khumarawaih. In October 896, Damian was named governor of Tarsus by the then-governor Ahmad ibn Tughan. Yusuf al-Baghmardi was his deputy and commander of the military forces of the region. Damian and al-Baghmardi, however, were ousted from Tarsus in March/April 897 by a revolt of the pro-Abbasid faction of the city under Raghib, a former mawla of al-Muwaffaq.

In 900, al-Tabari reports that Damian urged the Caliph al-Mu'tadid to burn the fleet of Tarsus, of over 50 large ships, as a revenge for his ouster three years before, a fact which greatly debilitated Muslim naval power. Nevertheless, it was as an admiral that Damian most distinguished himself. In 896 or more likely in 901, he sacked and plundered the port of Demetrias in the Hellas Theme. Damian then participated in Muhammad ibn Sulayman al-Katib's campaign in winter 904–905 that wrested Egypt from the Tulunids and restored it to Abbasid control; he led a fleet up the river Nile, raided its coasts, and prevented supplies for the Tulunid forces from being ferried over it. In 911, he attacked Cyprus, which since the 7th century had been a neutralized Arab-Byzantine condominium, and ravaged it for four months because its inhabitants had assisted a Byzantine fleet under admiral Himerios in attacking the Caliphate's coasts the year before. Finally, in October 912, along with the fellow-renegade Leo of Tripoli, he scored a decisive victory over Himerios off the island of Chios. In the summer of the same year, he is mentioned as accompanying the governor of the Cilician thughur, Rustam ibn Baradu, in an attack against the Byzantine frontier province of Lykandos and its Armenian governor Melias. Melias was besieged in his fortress, but the Arabs failed to take it.

Damian died in 924 while leading an attack against the Byzantine fortress of Strobilos in the Cibyrrhaeot Theme. His death, along with the probable death of Leo of Tripoli the year before, brought the era of Muslim naval superiority and of constant raids against the Byzantine coasts to an end.

== Sources ==
- Pryor, John H.; Jeffreys, Elizabeth M. (2006). The Age of the ΔΡΟΜΩΝ: The Byzantine Navy ca. 500–1204. Leiden and Boston, Massachusetts: Brill Academic Publishers. ISBN 978-90-04-15197-0.
- Rosenthal, Franz, ed. (1985). The History of al-Ṭabarī, Volume XXXVIII: The Return of the Caliphate to Baghdad: The Caliphates of al-Muʿtaḍid, al-Muktafī and al-Muqtadir, A.D. 892–915/A.H. 279–302. SUNY Series in Near Eastern Studies. Albany, New York: State University of New York Press. ISBN 978-0-87395-876-9.
- Setton, Kenneth (1954). "On the Raids of the Moslems in the Aegean in the Ninth and Tenth Centuries and their Alleged Occupation of Athens". American Journal of Archaeology. LVIII (4). Cambridge, Mass.: 311–319. doi:10.2307/500384. JSTOR 500384. S2CID 191372139.
- Treadgold, Warren (1997). A History of the Byzantine State and Society. Stanford, California: Stanford University Press. ISBN 0-8047-2630-2.

Preceded by Ahmad ibn Tughan	Governor of Tarsus; October 896 – March/April 897	Vacant Interregnum after end of Tulunid control Title next held by Ibn al-Ikhshad
