= Lamotis =

Ancient region of Anatolia

Lamotis (Ancient Greek: Λαμωτίς) was an ancient region on the eastern coast of Cilicia Trachea, later Cilicia Aspera, between the Calycadnus river and the Lamos river. Its capital was Antiochia Lamotis. (Ptolemy Book V, ch. 8, § 6; Strabo, Geography, 14.5.6-7)
