= Abu Sulaym Faraj al-Khadim al-Turki =

8th-century court eunuch and official

Rebuild of the city of Tarsus.
- In office 787 – 788
- Monarch: Harun al-Rashid

Supervised the Prisoner exchange
- In office 805
- Monarch: Harun al-Rashid

Personal details
- Died: Baghdad, Abbasid Caliphate
- Occupation: Abbasid Courtier and Court eunuch
- Known for: Supervised the prisoner exchange with the Byzantines

Abu Sulaym Faraj al-Khadim al-Turki, sometimes erroneously called Faraj ibn Sulaym, was an Abbasid court eunuch and official.

In 787, Caliph Harun al-Rashid (r. 786–809) established a new province encompassing the borderlands (Thughūr) with the Byzantine Empire in Cilicia and Upper Mesopotamia. As part of this, he sent Faraj to rebuild and repopulate the city of Tarsus. Faraj first sent 3,000 Khurasanis to the city, followed by a thousand each from the Syrian districts of al-Massisa and Antioch. The troops arrived in June 788 and encamped outside the city until the reconstruction of its walls, and the erection of a mosque, were completed. Furthermore, he supervised the very first prisoner exchange with the Byzantines recorded by al-Mas'udi for Harun's reign, in 805, on the Lamos River. Faraj evidently played an important role in the Byzantine frontier, as he is attested as the collector of the tithe in the area during the last years of Harun al-Rashid, and is recorded as having restored the "palace of Sayhan" in the area, and as the owner of a house in Antioch.

He is mentioned in 819, as accompanying the captured anti-caliph, Ibrahim ibn al-Mahdi, into the presence of Caliph al-Ma'mun (r. 813–833).

== Sources ==
- Ayalon, David (1999). Eunuchs, Caliphs and Sultans: A Study in Power Relationships. Jerusalem: Magnes Press, The Hebrew University. ISBN 978-9-6549-3017-8.
- Bosworth, C. E., ed. (1987). The History of al-Ṭabarī, Volume XXXII: The Reunification of the ʿAbbāsid Caliphate: The Caliphate of al-Maʾmūn, A.D. 813–33/A.H. 198–213. SUNY Series in Near Eastern Studies. Albany, New York: State University of New York Press. ISBN 978-0-88706-058-8.
- Bosworth, C. E., ed. (1989). The History of al-Ṭabarī, Volume XXX: The ʿAbbāsid Caliphate in Equilibrium: The Caliphates of Mūsā al-Hādī and Hārūn al-Rashīd, A.D. 785–809/A.H. 169–192. SUNY Series in Near Eastern Studies. Albany, New York: State University of New York Press. ISBN 978-0-88706-564-4.
- Bosworth, C. E. (1992). "The City of Tarsus and the Arab-Byzantine Frontiers in Early and Middle ʿAbbāsid Times". Oriens. 33: 268–286. doi:10.1163/1877837292X00105. ISSN 0078-6527. JSTOR 1580607.
