= Ibn al-Ikhshad =

Tarsus governor

Ibn al-Ikhshad or Ibn al-Ikhshid (Arabic: إبن الإخشيد) was the governor of Tarsus for the Abbasid Caliphate from April 898 until his death in battle against the Byzantines in early 900.

The name Ibn al-Ikhshad or Ibn al-Ikhshid derives from the Persian title ikhshid. From 890 until 897, the city of Tarsus and the borderlands (thughur) with the Byzantine Empire were controlled by the autonomous Tulunid dynasty of Egypt, but in 897 a pro-Abbasid party under Raghib took power in the city and arrested the Tulunid governor Damian and other pro-Tulunid officials. Envoys were then sent to the Abbasid capital Baghdad to ask for the appointment of a new governor. This was done, as Caliph al-Mu'tadid appointed Ibn al-Ikhshad as governor (amir), the latter leaving Baghdad to take up his post on 17 April 898 along with the Tarsiote envoys.

In the same winter (December 898/January 899) he undertook a raid against the Byzantines, reaching the fortress of Salandu (Traianopolis), which he captured, returning to Tarsus in early 899. Following the arrest of Raghib at Raqqa in August 899, Ibn al-Ikhshad arrested his servants and confiscated his possessions in Tarsus. Ibn al-Ikhshad was killed in another expedition into Byzantine territory shortly after, probably in early 900, leaving Abu Thabit as his deputy and successor behind him.

== Sources ==
- Lilie, Ralph-Johannes; Ludwig, Claudia; Pratsch, Thomas; Zielke, Beate (2013). Prosopographie der mittelbyzantinischen Zeit Online. Berlin-Brandenburgische Akademie der Wissenschaften. Nach Vorarbeiten F. Winkelmanns erstellt (in German). Berlin and Boston: De Gruyter.
- Rosenthal, Franz, ed. (1985). The History of al-Ṭabarī, Volume XXXVIII: The Return of the Caliphate to Baghdad: The Caliphates of al-Muʿtaḍid, al-Muktafī and al-Muqtadir, A.D. 892–915/A.H. 279–302. SUNY Series in Near Eastern Studies. Albany, New York: State University of New York Press. ISBN 978-0-87395-876-9.
- Stern, S. M. (1960). "The Coins of Thamal and of Other Governors of Tarsus". Journal of the American Oriental Society. 80 (3): 217–225. doi:10.2307/596170. JSTOR 596170.

Vacant Interregnum after end of Tulunid control Title last held by Damian of Tarsus	Governor of Tarsus; April 898 – early 900	Succeeded by Abu Thabit
