= Nasr al-Thamali =

Naṣr al-Thamalī (Arabic: نصر الثملي) was an Abbasid military commander and governor (wali or amir) of Tarsus and the borderlands with the Byzantine Empire in Cilicia (al-thughur al-Shamiya).

== Life ==
As his nisba shows, he was a former ghulam of Thamal al-Dulafi, who was the governor of Tarsus and the borderlands with the Byzantine Empire in Cilicia in c. 923–932.

By 941, Nasr was himself governor of Tarsus. In winter of that year (December 941/January 942) he took advantage of a Byzantine expedition against Aleppo to raid Byzantine territory himself, returning with much plunder and prisoners, including senior Byzantine commanders. In October 946 he supervised the prisoner exchange with the Byzantines—headed by John the Mystikos and the magistros Kosmas — on the River Lamos on behalf of the Hamdanid emir Sayf al-Dawla, who had in the meantime become the new overlord of the Cilician marches. 2,482 Muslims were exchanged for an equal number of Byzantine captives; as the Byzantines held 230 prisoners more, they had to be ransomed with money.

== Sources ==
- Lilie, Ralph-Johannes; Ludwig, Claudia; Pratsch, Thomas; Zielke, Beate (2013). Prosopographie der mittelbyzantinischen Zeit Online. Berlin-Brandenburgische Akademie der Wissenschaften. Nach Vorarbeiten F. Winkelmanns erstellt (in German). Berlin and Boston: De Gruyter.
- Stern, S. M. (1960). "The Coins of Thamal and of Other Governors of Tarsus". Journal of the American Oriental Society. 80 (3): 217–225. doi:10.2307/596170. JSTOR 596170.

Preceded by Bushra al-Thamali	Governor of Tarsus c. 941–946	Unknown Title next held by Ibn az-Zayyat
