= Muhammad ibn Musa ibn Tulun =

Governor of Tarsus (c. 892)

Muhammad ibn Musa ibn Tulun محمد بن موسى بن طولون
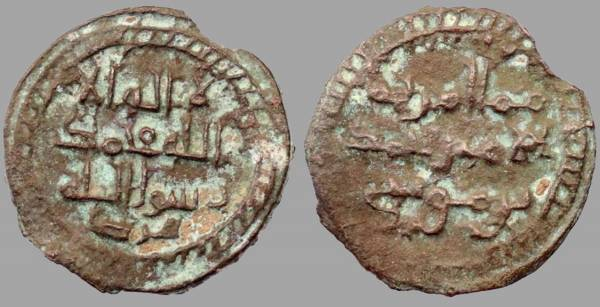

Governor of Tarsus
- In office Summer 892 – 18 August 892
- Preceded by: Ahmad ibn Tughan al-Ujayfi (first tenure)
- Succeeded by: Ahmad ibn Tughan al-Ujayfi (2nd tenure)

Muhammad ibn Musa ibn Tulun (Arabic: محمد بن موسى بن طولون) was a member of the Vassal Tulunid dynasty during Abbasid decline era and briefly governor of Tarsus.

He was appointed by his cousin, the Tulunid ruler Khumarawayh ibn Ahmad ibn Tulun, to replace Ahmad ibn Tughan al-Ujayfi as governor of Tarsus in early summer 892. On 18 August 892, however, he was deposed by an uprising of the populace of Tarsus, angry at a Tulunid attempt to imprison the local magnate Raghib and confiscate his property. Khumarawayh was forced to back down: Muhammad left the city, and Ahmad al-Ujayfi was restored as its governor.

== Sources ==
- Fields, Philip M., ed. (1987). The History of al-Ṭabarī, Volume XXXVII: The ʿAbbāsid Recovery: The War Against the Zanj Ends, A.D. 879–893/A.H. 266–279. SUNY Series in Near Eastern Studies. Albany, New York: State University of New York Press. ISBN 978-0-88706-054-0.
- Stern, S. M. (1960). "The Coins of Thamal and of Other Governors of Tarsus". Journal of the American Oriental Society. 80 (3): 217–225. doi:10.2307/596170. JSTOR 596170.
