= Abu Thabit =

Abbasid governor of Tarsus (c. 900)

Abu Thabit أبو ثابت

Governor of Tarsus
- In office ca. March 900 – ca. March 900
- Monarch: al-Mu'tadid
- Preceded by: Ibn al-Ikhshad
- Succeeded by: Ali ibn al-Arabi

Abu Thabit (Arabic: أبو ثابت) served briefly as governor of Tarsus for the Abbasid Caliphate in 900.

Governor Ibn al-Ikhshad left him behind in the city as his deputy and successor when the former went on a raid against the Byzantine Empire in late 899/early 900. Ibn al-Ikhshad was killed during the raid, and Abu Thabit succeeded him. He soon had to face a Byzantine counter-raid, which in March 900 reached the gates of Tarsus. Abu Thabit pursued the Byzantines to the river Rayhan (unidentified), but there was defeated and captured. According to al-Tabari, along with other Muslim prisoners he was taken prisoner to Iconium and thence to Constantinople.

Back in Tarsus, his son tried to take over his post, claiming that his father had appointed him as his successor, but this was opposed by the elders of Tarsus and the surrounding towns of the thughur, who chose Ali ibn al-Arabi. Abu Thabit's son armed followers to impose himself by force, but in the end was persuaded to accept Ibn al-Arabi.

== Sources ==
- Lilie, Ralph-Johannes; Ludwig, Claudia; Pratsch, Thomas; Zielke, Beate (2013). Prosopographie der mittelbyzantinischen Zeit Online. Berlin-Brandenburgische Akademie der Wissenschaften. Nach Vorarbeiten F. Winkelmanns erstellt (in German). Berlin and Boston: De Gruyter.
- Rosenthal, Franz, ed. (1985). The History of al-Ṭabarī, Volume XXXVIII: The Return of the Caliphate to Baghdad: The Caliphates of al-Muʿtaḍid, al-Muktafī and al-Muqtadir, A.D. 892–915/A.H. 279–302. SUNY Series in Near Eastern Studies. Albany, New York: State University of New York Press. ISBN 978-0-87395-876-9.

Preceded by Ibn al-Ikhshad	Governor of Tarsus ca. March 900	Succeeded by Ali ibn al-Arabi
