= Ibn al-Zayyat (governor of Tarsus) =

10th-century governor of Tarsus

Ibn al-Zayyat إبن الزيات

Governor of Tarsus
- In office 956–962
- Preceded by: Nasr al-Thamali
- Succeeded by: Rashiq al-Nasimi

Personal details
- Parent: Zayyat (father)
- Awards: Robe of honour in 956/57

Ibn al-Zayyat (Arabic: إبن الزيات) was the governor of Tarsus from ca. 956 until 962 for the Abbasid caliph al-Muti and Hamdanid ruler Sayf al-Dawla.

== Life ==
Ibn al-Zayyat was appointed to the post sometime before 956/7, when he is mentioned for the first time as going to meet Sayf al-Dawla at Adana, where he received a robe of honour. In late 961, with the support of the populace of Tarsus, he renounced his allegiance to the Hamdanid ruler, acknowledging the Abbasid caliph al-Muti instead. In early 962, he was faced with the invasion of Cilicia by the Byzantine commander-in-chief Nikephoros Phokas, who seized the fortress of Ayn Zarba and pillaged the Cilician countryside. Ibn al-Zayyat, with an army of 4,000 Tarsians, tried to oppose the Byzantine general, but he was defeated with heavy losses, including Ibn al-Zayyat's own brother. Following this defeat, the people of Tarsus once again turned to Sayf al-Dawla for protection, whereupon Ibn al-Zayyat killed himself by falling from the window of his house into the Berdan River (February 962), although at least one source (the 13th-century historian Yaqut) reports that he was present at the final surrender of Tarsus to Nikephoros Phokas (now emperor) in 965. Sayf al-Dawla appointed Rashiq al-Nasimi as his successor.

== Sources ==
- Lilie, Ralph-Johannes; Ludwig, Claudia; Pratsch, Thomas; Zielke, Beate (2013). Prosopographie der mittelbyzantinischen Zeit Online. Berlin-Brandenburgische Akademie der Wissenschaften. Nach Vorarbeiten F. Winkelmanns erstellt (in German). Berlin and Boston: De Gruyter.

| Vacant Unknown Title last held by Nasr al-Thamali | Governor of Tarsus by 956/7 – 962 | Succeeded by Rashiq al-Nasimi |
