= Thabit ibn Nasr =

Thabit ibn Nasr ibn Malik al-Khuza'i (Arabic: ثابت بن نصر الخزاعي) (died 813/14) was an Abbasid general and governor of the Cilician frontier zone (al-thughur al-Sha'miya) with the Byzantine Empire in 808–813.

Thabit was a native of Khurasan, and the grandson of Malik ibn al-Haytham al-Khuza'i, an early Abbasid follower and military leader. He was appointed as governor of the Syrian thughur (essentially comprising Cilicia, with Tarsus as its capital) in the last year of the reign of Harun al-Rashid (808/9). He organized a prisoner exchange with the Byzantines at Podandos in 808, but also led a series of raiding expeditions (sawa'if) against them. In one of these however, in August 812, he suffered a heavy defeat at the hands of Leo the Armenian, losing 2,000 men.

From ca. 810, with the outbreak of a civil war between al-Amin and his brother al-Ma'mun, Thabit, like many other provincial governors and magnates, was able to assume virtually independent control of his province. He died or was killed shortly after the final victory of Ma'mun in 813, according to some accounts poisoned by his cousin Nasr ibn Hamza ibn Malik.

== Sources ==
- Bonner, Michael David (1996). Aristocratic violence and holy war: studies in the jihad and the Arab-Byzantine frontier. American Oriental Society. ISBN 978-0-940490-11-6.
- Cobb, Paul M. (2001). White Banners: Contention in 'Abbāsid Syria, 750–880. SUNY Press. ISBN 0-7914-4880-0.
- Crone, Patricia (1980). Slaves on Horses: The Evolution of the Islamic Polity. Cambridge: Cambridge University Press. ISBN 0-521-52940-9.
- Lilie, Ralph-Johannes; Ludwig, Claudia; Pratsch, Thomas; Zielke, Beate (2013). Prosopographie der mittelbyzantinischen Zeit Online. Berlin-Brandenburgische Akademie der Wissenschaften. Nach Vorarbeiten F. Winkelmanns erstellt (in German). Berlin and Boston: De Gruyter.

Unknown Title last held by Abu'l-Fawaris	Governor of Tarsus; 808–813	Unknown Title next held by Ahmad ibn Sa'id ibn Salm ibn Qutayba al-Bahili
