= Muflih (eunuch) =

Muflih, surnamed al-Aswad ("the Black") and al-Khadim ("the servant"), was the chief court eunuch under the Abbasid caliph al-Muqtadir (r. 908–932).

By 922/3 he had risen to a position of great influence at court, and supported the ousting of the vizier Hamid ibn al-Abbas, whom he disliked, in favour of Ali ibn al-Furat. He intervened, however, to save Hamid's deputy Ali ibn Isa al-Jarrah from the tortures inflicted on him by Ibn al-Furat's son al-Muhassin.

In September–October 925 he supervised, along with Bushra al-Thamali, deputy of the governor of the Thughur Thamal al-Dulafi, that year's prisoner exchange with the Byzantine Empire. The exchange, known as fidāʾ Mufliḥ in the Arab sources, involved the release of almost 4,000 Muslim men and women from captivity.

According to al-Suli, Muflih was appointed as governor of Jerusalem in 935, during the caliphate of al-Radi.

== Sources ==
- Ayalon, David (1999). Eunuchs, Caliphs and Sultans: A Study in Power Relationships. Jerusalem: Magnes Press, The Hebrew University. ISBN 978-9-6549-3017-8.
- Bowen, Harold (1928). The Life and Times of ʿAlí Ibn ʿÍsà, ‘The Good Vizier’. Cambridge: Cambridge University Press.
- Gil, Moshe (1997) [1983]. A History of Palestine, 634–1099. Translated by Ethel Broido. Cambridge: Cambridge University Press. ISBN 0-521-59984-9.
- Lilie, Ralph-Johannes; Ludwig, Claudia; Pratsch, Thomas; Zielke, Beate (2013). Prosopographie der mittelbyzantinischen Zeit Online. Berlin-Brandenburgische Akademie der Wissenschaften. Nach Vorarbeiten F. Winkelmanns erstellt (in German). Berlin and Boston: De Gruyter.
