= Byzantine reconquest of Cilicia =

10th-century Byzantine–Arab contest

- Part of the Arab–Byzantine wars
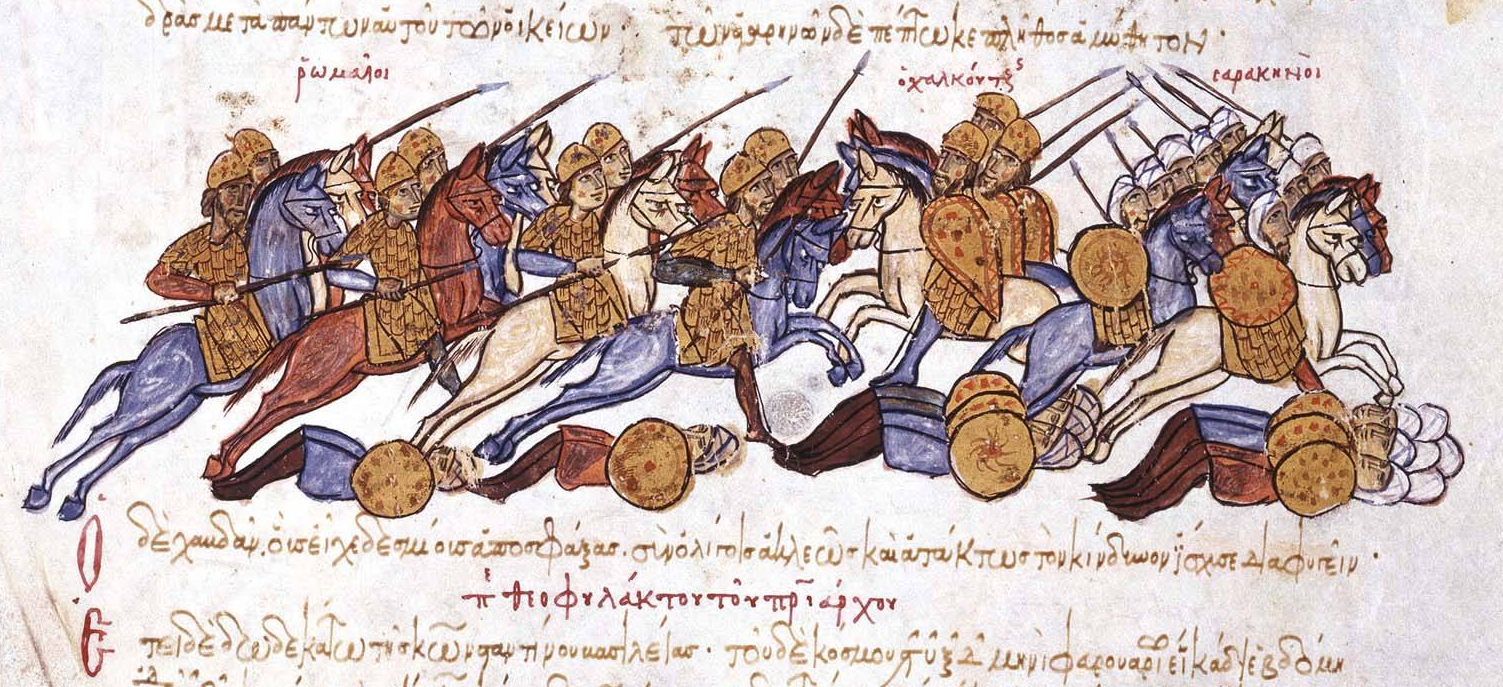
- Niketas Chalkoutzes and his entourage escape during a battle between the Byzantines and the Arabs. Miniature from the Madrid Skylitzes
Date	964–965
Location	Cilicia
Result	Byzantine victory
Territorial changes	Cilicia reconquered by the Byzantine Empire

Belligerents
Hamdanid Dynasty; Abbasid Caliphate	Byzantine Empire	Hamdanid Rebels

Commanders and leaders
Sayf al-Dawla; Ali ibn Hamdan	Nikephoros Phokas; Niketas Chalkoutzes; John Tzimiskes; Leo Phokas	Ibn az-Zayyat; Hibat Allah; Marwan al-'Uqayli; Rashiq ibn Abdallah al-Nasimi; Dizbar; Naja al-Kasaki

Strength
	70,000 in 961; 40,000 in 964	

The Byzantine reconquest of Cilicia was a series of conflicts and engagements between the forces of the Byzantine Empire under Nikephoros II Phokas and the Hamdanid ruler of Aleppo, Sayf al-Dawla, over control of the region of Cilicia in southeastern Anatolia. Since the Muslim conquests of the 7th century, Cilicia had been a frontier province of the Muslim world and a base for regular raids against the Byzantine provinces in Anatolia. By the middle of the 10th century, the fragmentation of the Abbasid Caliphate and the strengthening of Byzantium under the Macedonian dynasty allowed the Byzantines to gradually take the offensive. Under the soldier-emperor Nikephoros II Phokas (r. 963–969), with the help of the general and future emperor John I Tzimiskes, the Byzantines overcame the resistance of Sayf al-Dawla, who had taken control of the former Abbasid borderlands in northern Syria, and launched a series of aggressive campaigns that in 964–965 recaptured Cilicia. The successful conquest opened the way for the recovery of Cyprus and Antioch over the next few years, and the eclipse of the Hamdanids as an independent power in the region.

== Background ==
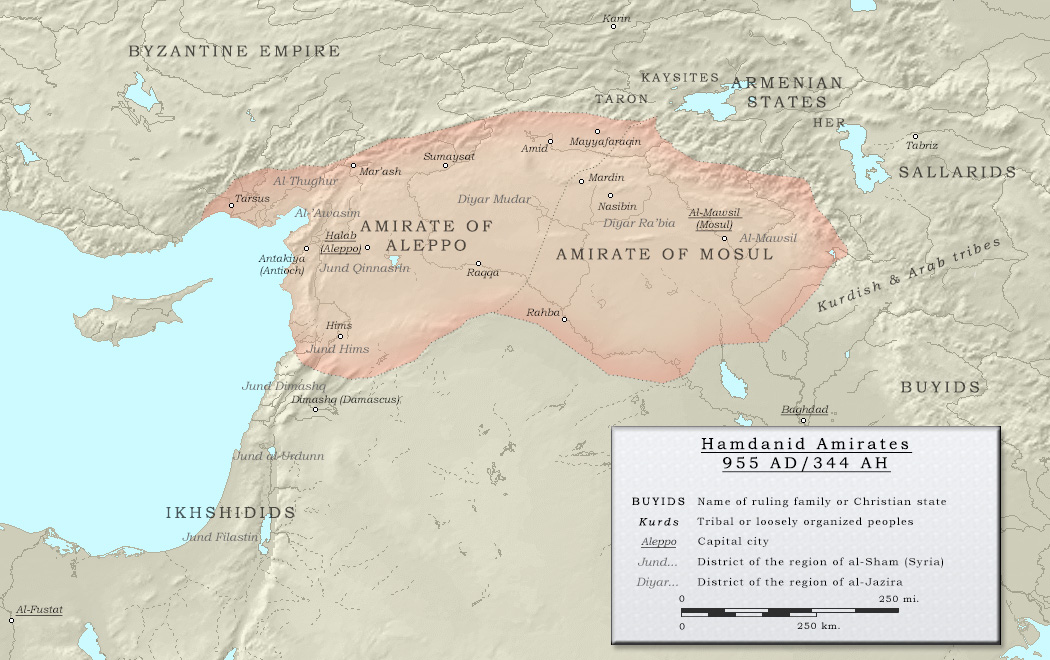
Map of the Hamdanids at their greatest extent under al-Dawla, ca. 955

As of the middle of the tenth century, Byzantium was in the midst of a resurgence. In 961 the empire had reclaimed Crete from the Muslims and, following the conquest, was prepared to make expeditions against the Arabs in Anatolia. The Emir of Aleppo, and ruler of the Hamdanid dynasty at the time, was Sayf al-Dawla (r. 945–967). A confident and aggressive commander, he executed numerous raids into the Greek heartland, as far as Iconium. After al-Dawla confirmed his rule in Aleppo in 944, he continued the Arab practice of raiding into Byzantine territory, formally resuming war in 945/46. Despite the frequency and effectiveness of his raids in disrupting Byzantine commerce and generally creating chaos on Byzantium's eastern front, al-Dawla's tactics were defensive in nature, and his armies never posed a serious threat to Byzantine domination of Anatolia; contemporary Arab sources claim (indeed perhaps exaggerate) that Byzantium's armies probably outnumbered al-Dawla's by around 70,000.

Al-Dawla's Emirate was inherently weak. It lacked any kind of naval presence, as al-Dawla sought actively to avoid any kind of pressure to Byzantium's dominance of the Eastern Mediterranean Sea. Meanwhile, the Thughur system of Hamdanid administration was inefficient and ineffective. Adapted from the Byzantine Themata system, from which the name derives, combined with the devastating effects of Byzantium's scorched earth tactics on the populace, the Thugur system left the Hamdanid provinces in destruction and poverty. Al-Dawla's winter raid (945–946) was of little effect, and fighting between the two powers died down for a few years.

In 948 and 949 the Byzantines managed two successful invasions of the Hamdanids and sacked Adata in the first expedition and Germanikeia in the second, even raiding as far as Antioch. In 950 al-Dawla attempted to raid into Byzantine territory, and was crushed by Leo Phokas, losing 8,000 men in the "dreadful expedition". Later the same year al-Dawla again attempted to raid Byzantine territory, rejecting their offers of peace, but was soon forced to retire by the coming of winter. The next year Bardas Phokas launched a failed expedition into Cilicia in an attempt to prevent the Arabs from repairing some strategic fortresses. Two years later Bardas once again tried and failed to invade al-Dawla's Cilicia. The Hamdanids would hold out against two more Byzantine attacks in 954 and 955.

More serious conflict began in the spring of 956, when al-Dawla began a renewed invasion of Byzantine territory. John Tzimiskes, commanding the Byzantine army, managed to counter by his own invasion of Cilicia, managing to secure a pass in al-Dawla's rear. However, when the two clashed, al-Dawla won decisively, killing 4,000 of Tzimiskes' men. At the same time, Leo Phokas invaded Syria, engaging and defeating al-Dawla's cousin, Abu'l-'Asha'ir. In 957 Nikephorus managed to capture and subsequently raze Adata, and al-Dawla was unable to respond due to the discovery of a plot against him. From there the tide continued to turn against al-Dawla. In 958, Tzimiskes invaded Arab territory once again, seizing Dara and defeating an army of 10,000 men under al-Dawla's lieutenant Nadja. The next year Leo Phokas managed a raid which extended as far as Cyrrhus.

== Call for Jihad ==
Tensions reached their apex in 960 when al-Dawla declared a jihad. This call for holy war, and the attendant marshaling and consolidation of his forces, were al-Dawla's attempt to exploit a perceived weakness in Byzantium's defenses following Nikephoros' departure for Crete. Meanwhile, Leo passed into Muslim territory, avoiding the brunt of al-Dawla's forces and plundering as he went. When an Arab army under general Ali ibn Hamdan returned home after raids on Byzantine territory, Leo ambushed and destroyed it, slaughtering the soldiers and recovering loot of both Byzantine and Arab origin. The cumulative effect of al-Dawla's defeats was internal as well as external, as his own government began to lose faith in him. and was troubled by the onset of hemiplegia as well as worsening intestinal and urinary disorders, which henceforth confined him to a litter . Nikephoros now returned victorious from Crete with the majority of the Byzantine army. He campaigned in Cilicia from 961 to 962, taking Anazarbus. After retiring to Byzantine territory for Easter 962, Nikephoros returned in the autumn in order to expel al-Dawla, who had entered Cilicia itself. Thereafter Nikephoros invaded Arab territory with a 70,000-man strong army, taking Germanikeia, Sisium, Doliche, and Hierapolis. Ignoring al-Dawla's advance, he brought his army to Aleppo in mid-December, capturing and plundering the city.

The war died down in 963, as the two powers dealt with internal problems. The death of Byzantine emperor Romanus II caused a brief succession crisis, which ended when Nikephoros took the throne as Nikephoros II Phokas (r. 963–969). On the Hamdanid side, Al-Dawla faced rebellions by three successive noblemen: Ibn az-Zayyat in 961, Hibat Allah in 963, and Nadja in 963–64. A brief Arab raid was countered by Tzimiskes, who had received Nikephoros' old command. He soon invaded Cilicia, defeated an Arab army, and made an unsuccessful attempt to besiege the important fortress of Mopsuestia.

== Final conquest of Cilicia ==
The Byzantine themes of Asia before the conquest of Cilicia

By the time Nikephoros became emperor, after his successful seizure of Crete, he had decided on a grander plan to expand Byzantine territory, rather than merely sack the Arab cities and withdraw. He began his invasion in Autumn 964 and set out with an army of 40,000. He began by spreading out his lighter infantry throughout the Cilician countryside and ordered them to loot and plunder the villages in order to ensure a general atmosphere of confusion and disarray among al-Dawla's administration. Nikephoros then marched the main segment of his forces, the Imperial Army plus the forces of the themes of Asia Minor, through Arab territory and began to capture major fortresses and cities. He took Adana, Anazarbus, and around twenty other fortified cities. He then marched on to Mopsuestia. Tarsus and Mopsuestia were the two largest remain fortresses in the region. Nikephoros quickly realized, after bombarding the city, that only a prolonged siege would manage to force Mopsuestia to capitulate. Soon, with the coming of winter, Nikephoros retreated to his regional capital of Caesarea, where he passed the season preparing for next year's campaigning season on the sieges of Mopsuestia and Tarsus.

At the spring of 965, Nikephoros once again collected his forces and departed for Cilicia. This time, however, Nikephoros headed straight for Tarsus. There he met the garrison outside of the walls of the city and engaged it. He decisively defeated the army and drove them back into the fortress. He then blockaded the city, raided the surrounding countryside and left for Mopsuestia, leaving the city besieged, blockade, and surrounded by destruction and desolation. He began to in turn siege Mopsuestia, bombarding the city with archers and siege engines. He then employed a similar strategy as used in the Siege of Chandax only four years earlier. He instructed his engineers to dig under the city fortifications while the Arabs were distracted and collapse the weakest perceived section of the wall. This worked, and soon the Byzantines began to pour into the city from the destroyed section. The city was then looted and razed, while Nikephoros deported all of its inhabitants. He then returned to Tarsus where the populace, after hearing of the destruction of Mopsuestia, sought terms with the Greeks. They handed over the city to Nikephoros in exchange for the safe passage of migrants seeking to emigrate to Syria, which he granted. With the capture of these two cities, Cilicia once again came under the suzerainty of Byzantium, and Nikephoros returned to Constantinople.

It was around this time that on Cyprus the Byzantine general Niketas Chalkoutzes staged a coup. The nature of the circumstances of this coup are dubious due to a lack of sources, but it is clear that the Abbasid authorities had no preconceived notions of it as it was incredibly successful. The island was returned to the Byzantines and reintegrated into the Theme System.

== Aftermath ==
Following the quelling of some civil unrest in the spring of 966, Nikephoros once again set out for the east. Nikephoros' strategy was not one of traditional Byzantine origin, but combined the tactics used by the Arabs with his own strategy. He largely avoided open confrontation, pillaging, raiding and capturing cities where he could. He marched east with his army from Constantinople, joining up with his new forces as he passed through Byzantine Cilicia, and advanced onto Syria. Nikephoros soon led his army to Antioch, where he set up a light siege and began to raid the countryside.

In the fall of 967, Nikephoros captured many forts in southern Syria, and eventually came to Tripoli. He wished to meet up with his navy there, but the winds and tides were uncooperative and he could not besiege the city, and instead marched north to the fortress of Arqa, which he soon captured and looted. It was around this time in 967 that al-Dawla died. His successor, Sa'd al-Dawla, was a weak and ineffectual ruler, and by the time he ascended the throne, Hamdanid territory had become a mere battlefield on which the Byzantines and Fatimids could settle their disputes. Nikephoros did not cease the pillage of Syria until the spring of 969 when he returned to Constantinople. However, he left a large garrison in a citadel of his construction outside of Antioch in order to maintain the siege. Around a year later, Byzantine forces retook Antioch and cemented Byzantine control of the region.

Following the loss of Cilicia and Antioch, the Hamdanid state began to deteriorate rapidly. A string of rebellions would fracture and crush the dynasty's power, and the state would barely last to the end of the century before being vassalized and subsequently dissolved by the Fatimid Dynasty of Egypt, which would in turn rise to dominate the Levant and the near east for centuries. Byzantium, on the other hand, would continue to expand under the successive emperors Nikephoros, John II Tzimiskes, and Basil II. In fact, the Byzantines would see nearly unchecked expansion from the conquests of Cilicia and Antioch, only finally being subdued by the Seljuk Empire at the Battle of Manzikert in 1071.

== Sources ==
- Bianquis, Thierry (1997). "Sayf al-Dawla". In Bosworth, C. E.; van Donzel, E.; Heinrichs, W. P. & Lecomte, G. (eds.). The Encyclopaedia of Islam, Second Edition. Volume IX: San–Sze. Leiden: E. J. Brill. pp. 103–110. doi:10.1163/1573-3912_islam_COM_1010. ISBN 978-90-04-10422-8.
- Bianquis, Thierry (1998). "Autonomous Egypt from Ibn Ṭūlūn to Kāfūr, 868–969". In Petry, Carl F. (ed.). Cambridge History of Egypt, Volume One: Islamic Egypt, 640–1517. Cambridge: Cambridge University Press. pp. 86–119. ISBN 0-521-47137-0.
- Kennedy, Hugh (2004) [1986]. The Prophet and the Age of the Caliphates: The Islamic Near East from the 6th to the 11th Century (Second ed.). Harlow: Longman. ISBN 978-0-582-40525-7.
- Romane, Julian (2015). Byzantium Triumphant. Pen and Sword Books. pp. 34–35. ISBN 978-1473845701.
- Treadgold, Warren (1997). A History of the Byzantine State and Society. Stanford, California: Stanford University Press. ISBN 0-8047-2630-2.
- Whittow, Mark (1996). The Making of Byzantium, 600–1025. Berkeley and Los Angeles, California: University of California Press. ISBN 978-0-520-20496-6.
