= Naja al-Kasaki =

Lieutenant

Naja al-Kasaki, or Nadja was a lieutenant serving under the Emir of Aleppo, Sayf al-Dawla, during the tenth Century. In the spring of 958, al-Dawla sent Naja to the Jazira in order to confront an invading Byzantine force led by the general and future emperor John I Tzimiskes. Commanding an army some 10,000 men strong, Naja was soundly defeated by Tzimiskes, who continued to march through the Jazira unopposed, even going on to capture Samosata and defeat al-Dawla himself in battle. In 960, in an attempt to abuse the absence of a Byzantine presence in the east, following their assault on Crete, al-Dawla sent Naja to assault the Armenian fort of Turnīq, where he won a victory against the commander of Hanzit, the patrikios Michael. The next year, Naja once again raided into Armenia, where he defeated the Emir of Melitene, 'Abd Allah, who had accepted Byzantine vassalage. In September of 963, Naja raided around Melitene again. In the same year, Naja was sent to subdue an internal rebellion led by the former governor of Harran, Hibat Allah. After defeating the rebel, Naja himself turned against al-Dawla, swiftly moving towards Mayyafariqin. Naja failed to take the city, however, and he soon retreated to Armenia where he managed to capture a few fortresses around Lake Van. In fall 964, Naja again failed to take Mayyafariqin, and soon resubmitted to the authority of al-Dawla. He was murdered in Mayyafariqin during the winter of 965.

== Sources ==
- Bianquis, Thierry (1997). "Sayf al-Dawla". In Bosworth, C. E.; van Donzel, E.; Heinrichs, W. P. & Lecomte, G. (eds.). The Encyclopaedia of Islam, Second Edition. Volume IX: San–Sze. Leiden: E. J. Brill. pp. 103–110. doi:10.1163/1573-3912_islam_COM_1010. ISBN 978-90-04-10422-8.
- Kaldellis, Anthony (2017). Streams of Gold, Rivers of Blood: The Rise and Fall of Byzantium, 955 A.D. to the First Crusade. Oxford University Press. ISBN 978-0190253226.
- Lilie, Ralph-Johannes; Ludwig, Claudia; Pratsch, Thomas; Zielke, Beate (2013). Prosopographie der mittelbyzantinischen Zeit Online. Berlin-Brandenburgische Akademie der Wissenschaften. Nach Vorarbeiten F. Winkelmanns erstellt (in German). Berlin and Boston: De Gruyter.
