= Antiochia Lamotis =

Hellenistic city in ancient Cilicia, Anatolia

- Αντιόχεια η Λαμωτίς (Greek)
- Antiochia super Cragum
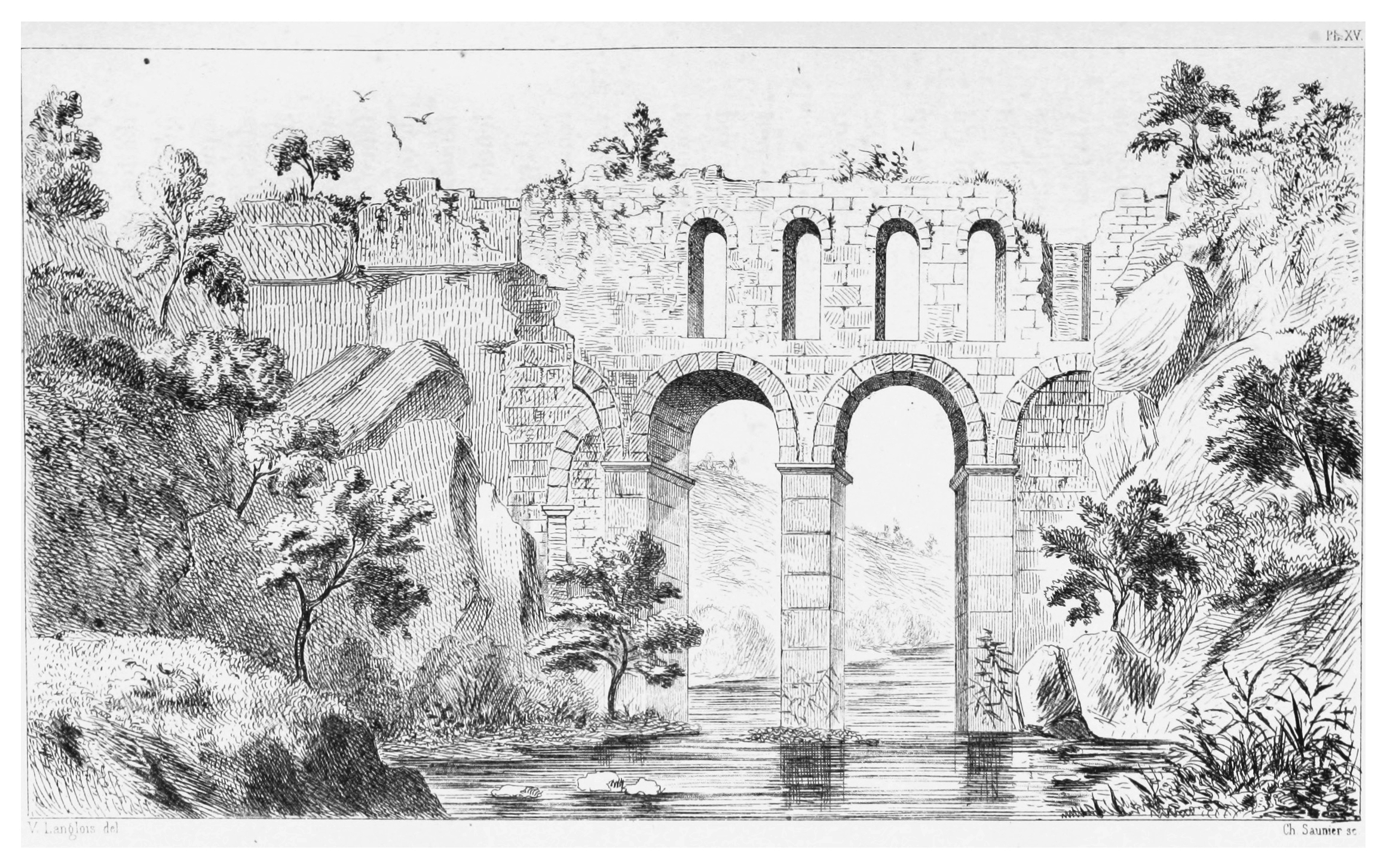
- Ruins of İamus in 1861 by Langlois

- Location within Turkey
- 36°33′26″N 34°14′28″E
- Type: Settlement
- Cultures: Hellenistic, Roman, Byzantine
- Location: Cilicia, Turkey
- Region: Lamotis

Site notes
- Condition: Ruins

Antiochia Lamotis (Greek: Αντιόχεια η Λαμωτίς), Antiochia in Isauria (Αντιόχεια της Ισαυρίας), or Antiochia super Cragum is a Hellenistic city in ancient Cilicia, Anatolia at the mouth of Lamos (or Lamus) river. The site is on the coast a few kilometers southwest of Erdemli, Mersin Province, Turkey.

During Roman times, it was the capital of the Lamotis Region, Cilicia. The town also bore the name Lamus or Lamos (Λάμος). The river is mentioned by Stephanus of Byzantium, and both the river and the town by Strabo and Ptolemy. The river, which is otherwise of no importance, formed the boundary between Cilicia Aspera and Cilicia Propria.

The town later became the seat of a bishop; no longer a residential bishopric, it remains a titular see in the Roman Catholic Church under the name of Lamus.
