= Kitab al-'Uyun =

Arabic chronicle of Caliphate history

- Author: Anonymous author
- Original title: Kitab al-'uyun wa'l-hada'iq fi akhbar al-haqa'iq كتاب العيون والحدائق في أخبار الحقائق
- Language: Arabic
- Subject: Chronicle covering Muslim history
- Genre: Historical biography of events
- Publication date: Late 11th century
- Pages: volumes (Only the third and fourth volumes of the work survive)

The Kitab al-'uyun wa'l-hada'iq fi akhbar al-haqa'iq (Arabic: كتاب العيون والحدائق في أخبار الحقائق) is an Arabic chronicle covering Muslim history up to the year 961 AD. The author of the work is anonymous, but the text was likely written in the late eleventh century.

The contents of the Kitab al-'Uyun are organized by the reigns of successive caliphs and are loosely subdivided in an annalistic fashion. Much of the work consists of selections from the histories of al-Tabari, al-Mas'udi, Miskawayh and al-Farghani, but it also includes otherwise lost material from a number of other sources, especially Egyptian and North African authors.

Only the third and fourth volumes of the work survive. The third volume, covering the period from the beginning of the reign of the Umayyad caliph al-Walid (r. 705–715) to the death of the Abbasid caliph al-Mu'tasim (died 842), was published by Michael Jan de Goeje and Pieter de Jong in 1869. The fourth volume, published by Omar Saïdi in 1972, only survives from page 47 on and therefore begins in 870 during the reign of al-Muhtadi (r. 869–870), and continues until 961.
