= Arab–Byzantine prisoner exchanges =

Mideastern Middle Age war-time events during the years 769–969

During the course of the Arab–Byzantine wars, exchanges of prisoners of war became a regular feature of the relations between the Byzantine Empire and the Abbasid Caliphate. The exchanges began in the late 8th century and continued until the late 10th century. Most of them took place at the Lamos River in Cilicia, on the border between the two powers.

== Background ==
Centuries of war between the Byzantine Empire and the Arab Caliphate had led to a degree of mutual understanding and respect, evidenced by a regular pattern of diplomatic and cultural exchange between the two powers. This is exemplified in the protocols for the imperial receptions at the Byzantine court, where the "Eastern Muslims" are accorded the first place immediately after any ecclesiastical officials, including Bulgarians and Frankish co-religionists.

There was also humane treatment of prisoners of war by both sides; on the Byzantine side, although Arab prisoners were usually paraded in triumphal processions, they were otherwise generally well treated. Senior figures that were state prisoners were often honoured guests during the duration of their captivity, being regularly invited to attend races at the Hippodrome or imperial banquets at the Great Palace; they were often given gifts as part of imperial ceremonies. Nevertheless, the rank and file were usually sold off for slavery in the Byzantine Empire or kept in prison until ransomed or exchanged. Most were employed as a labour force, although some who might be induced to convert to Christianity were given lands to settle. Otherwise they enjoyed the freedom to worship at mosques of their own. Al-Muqaddasi noted that although the Arab captives were made to work as slaves, they could earn money, and that the Byzantines "do not force any of them to eat pork, and they do not slit their noses or their tongues".

The Abbasid Caliphate followed the Islamic views on prisoners of war, according to which non-Muslim war captives were defined as kafir of dar al-Harb (non-Muslims from non-Muslim lands) and as such legitimate to enslave by Muslims. In accordance with this principle, when a non-Muslim Byzantine city was taken by the Caliphate, the city was sacked, after which its inhabitants was typically captured and then sold on the market for slavery in the Abbasid Caliphate, a known case being that of the siege and capture of Heraclea Cybistra during the Abbasid invasion of Asia Minor (806). Prior to the Abbasid Caliphate, during the Rashidun and Umayyad Caliphates, most prisoners appear to have been enslaved and sold, but during the Abbasid Caliphate from the late 8th century onward, it became more common with prisoner exchanges and ransom of prisoners, particilary concerning prisoners of rank.

Both sides also engaged in regular exchanges of prisoners (ἀλλάγια, allagia, in Greek; fidāʾ, pl. afdiya, in Arabic), which took place on the river Lamos (mod. Limonlu Çayı) in Cilicia, on the border between Byzantium and the Caliphate. A truce was arranged beforehand, and both sides met on the river. The exchange was made man for man, as illustrated by al-Tabari in his report of the 845 exchange: "Two bridges were built over the river, one for the prisoners of each side. Each side released one prisoner, who walked across the bridge towards his co-religionists, simultaneously with his counterpart. After the exchange was complete, the surplus prisoners were either ransomed for money or exchanged for slaves."

== Prisoner exchanges ==
Year	Details
769	Mentioned only by Theophanes the Confessor.
797	Mentioned only by al-Mas'udi.
805	Mentioned by al-Mas'udi and al-Tabari. It was the first to take place on the Lamos, and was supervised by the eunuch courtier Abu Sulayman Faraj. It lasted 12 days, and 3,700 prisoners were exchanged.
808	Mentioned by al-Mas'udi and al-Tabari as the "fidāʾ Thābit ibn Naṣr", after the man who supervised it on the Arab side. It lasted 7 days, and 2,500 prisoners were exchanged.
810	Mentioned only by al-Mas'udi.
816	Mentioned only by al-Mas'udi.
Sep. 845	Mentioned by several Muslim sources ("fidāʾ Khāqān"), according to which the Byzantines had many more prisoners than the Muslims, forcing Caliph al-Wathiq to cover the balance by purchasing slaves from the markets of Baghdad and Raqqa, and even by liberating slave women from his own household. The Muslim prisoners were questioned by an emissary of the chief qadi, Ahmad ibn Abi Duwad, on their opinion on Quranic createdness, allowing only those who supported it to be exchanged. The exchange lasted 10 days. Al-Tabari records that the Muslims recovered 4,600 prisoners, of whom 600 women and 500 dhimmis, while Ibn al-Athir gives the respective numbers as 4,460, 800 and 100.
23 February 856	The "fidāʾ Shunayf" of the Muslim sources, it lasted 7 days. Al-Tabari reports that in total, the Byzantines held 20,000 Muslim prisoners, and that Empress-regent Theodora sent an envoy George, the son of Kyriakos, to arrange for the exchange. Caliph al-Mutawakkil in turn sent Nasr ibn al-Azhar ibn Faraj to assess the number of Muslim prisoners. A truce was arranged from 19 November 855 until 5 March 856. The Abbasid delegation was led by Shunayf al-Khadim, and he was joined by the chief qadi, Ja'far ibn Abd al-Wahid, and a number of leading Baghdadis. According to al-Tabari, the Muslims recovered 785 men and 125 women. Al-Mas'udi on the other hand gives the figure as 2,200 men or 2,000 men and 100 women.
Apr./May 860	The "fidāʾ Naṣr ibn al-Azhar waʿ Alī ibn Yaḥyā". According to al-Tabari, Emperor Michael III sent an elderly emissary named Triphylios with 77 Muslim prisoners to al-Mutawakkil, being presented before the Caliph on 31 May 859. Nasr ibn al-Azhar ibn Faraj was sent to accompany the Byzantine envoy back to Constantinople, but the exchange was delayed until the next spring, after the Byzantine garrison of the border fortress Loulon rebelled and went over to the Abbasids. According to al-Tabari and al-Mas'udi, 2,367 Muslim prisoners, both men and women, were exchanged in 7 days.
861/2	Mentioned only by al-Mas'udi.
867	Mentioned only by al-Mas'udi.
872	Mentioned only by al-Mas'udi.
Sep./Oct. 896	The "fidāʾ Ibn Ṭughān". According to al-Tabari and Sibt ibn al-Jawzi, the Muslims recovered 2,504 prisoners, men, women and children, over 10 days, while Mas'udi variously gives a total of 2,495 prisoners or 3,000 men.
Sep. 905	Supervised by Rustam ibn Baradu, the exchange was interrupted after 1,154 or 1,155 Muslim prisoners had been exchanged, according to al-Mas'udi, because the Byzantines reneged on the agreed terms. Hence known as the "ransom of treachery" (fidāʾ al-ghadr) in the Arab sources.
July 908	After a two-year diplomatic mission by the Byzantine envoy Leo Choirosphaktes, the exchange resumed in 908, hence it was named "ransom of completion" (fidāʾ al-tamām). Again under the supervision of Rustam ibn Baradu, the Muslims recovered 2,842 further prisoners according to al-Mas'udi (al-Tabari gives "about 3,000").
Sep./Oct. 917	The exchange ("fidāʾ Muʾnis") was preceded by a Byzantine embassy under John Rhadenos to Baghdad. 5,500 prisoners were exchanged according to Ibn al-Jawzi, 3,336 over 8 days according to al-Mas'udi.
Sep./Oct. 925	The "fidāʾ Mufliḥ". According to al-Mas'udi, 3,983 Muslims were exchanged over 19 days, while al-Maqrizi gives 3,933.
Oct. 938	The "fidāʾ Ibn Warqāʾ". The negotiations on the Muslim side were handled by the autonomous ruler of Egypt, al-Ikhshid. More than 6,300 people were exchanged over 16 days, but the Byzantines still held 800 more prisoners than the Muslims, and the truce was extended for six months to allow the remaining captives to be ransomed for money in smaller batches.
Oct. 946	The last exchange to take place at the Lamos. 2,482 prisoners, men and women, were exchanged, with the remaining 230 Muslim prisoners held by the Byzantines ransomed with 80,000 gold dinars, paid partly by the Hamdanid Emir of Aleppo, Sayf al-Dawla, and partly by the Ikhshidids. The exchange was supervised by Nasr al-Thamali on behalf of Sayf al-Dawla, whence the exchange is also known as "fidāʾ Ibn Ḥamdān".
953	Small exchange which took place in Alexandria, involving 60 Muslim prisoners.
954	The Byzantines sent an embassy to Sayf al-Dawla to negotiate a prisoner exchange.
966	The exchange took place on 23 June between Sayf al-Dawla and Emperor Nikephoros II Phokas at Samosata, following the Byzantine conquest of Cilicia under Phokas in the previous years. The Byzantines held more than 3,000 prisoners, which Sayf al-Dawla promised to ransom at 270 dinars each. However, he ran out of money after 240,000 dinars had been paid, and was forced to ransom the rest by handing over a valuable cuirass and a hostage from the grandees of his court. Among the exchanged prisoners was Sayf al-Dawla's cousin and celebrated poet, Abu Firas.
969	The exchange took place between the Byzantines and the Fatimid Caliphate, after both powers had partitioned Syria between them.

What is notable in the numbers reported for the exchanges, according to Arnold J. Toynbee, is that even in 845, before the Byzantines gained the upper hand in the Battle of Lalakaon (863), they held more prisoners than the Arabs, despite the wholesale capture and deportation of Byzantine subjects in events like the sack of Amorium in 838. According to Toynbee, this attests to the efficiency of the Byzantine military's strategy of "dogging and pouncing" the Muslim armies that raided Asia Minor.

== See also ==
- Prisoners of war in Islam

== Sources ==
- Ali ibn al-Husain al-Mas'udi (1896). Le livre de l'avertissement et de la revision. Translated by Baron Carra de Vaux. Paris: Imprimerie Nationale.
- Cappel, Andrew J.; Cutler, Anthony; Kazhdan, Alexander (1991). "Prisoners of war". In Kazhdan, Alexander (ed.). The Oxford Dictionary of Byzantium. Oxford and New York: Oxford University Press. p. 1722–1723. ISBN 0-19-504652-8.
- Huart, Cl. (1986). "Lamas-Ṣū". In Bosworth, C. E.; van Donzel, E.; Lewis, B. & Pellat, Ch. (eds.). The Encyclopaedia of Islam, Second Edition. Volume V: Khe–Mahi. Leiden: E. J. Brill. p. 647. ISBN 978-90-04-07819-2.
- Kraemer, Joel L., ed. (1989). The History of al-Ṭabarī, Volume XXXIV: Incipient Decline: The Caliphates of al-Wāthiq, al-Mutawakkil and al-Muntaṣir, A.D. 841–863/A.H. 227–248. SUNY Series in Near Eastern Studies. Albany, New York: State University of New York Press. ISBN 978-0-88706-874-4.
- Oikonomides, Nicolas (1991). "Prisoners, Exchanges of". In Kazhdan, Alexander (ed.). The Oxford Dictionary of Byzantium. Oxford and New York: Oxford University Press. p. 1722. ISBN 0-19-504652-8.
- Rosenthal, Franz, ed. (1985). The History of al-Ṭabarī, Volume XXXVIII: The Return of the Caliphate to Baghdad: The Caliphates of al-Muʿtaḍid, al-Muktafī and al-Muqtadir, A.D. 892–915/A.H. 279–302. SUNY Series in Near Eastern Studies. Albany, New York: State University of New York Press. ISBN 978-0-87395-876-9.
- Toynbee, Arnold (1973). Constantine Porphyrogenitus and His World. London and New York: Oxford University Press. ISBN 0-19-215253-X.
