= Limonlu River =

River in Turkey

Limonlu Çayı Lamos, Lamus
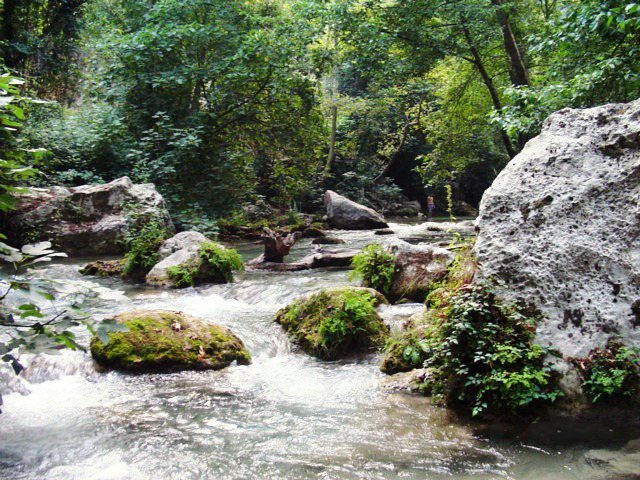
- Limonlu in the Kayacı valley

Location
- Country: Turkey
- Province: Mersin

Physical characteristics
- Source
  - location: Yüğlük Dağı
  - coordinates: 36.994641°N 33.819911°E
  - elevation: c. 2,000 m (6,600 ft)
- Mouth
  - location: Near Limonlu on the Mediterranean
  - coordinates: 36°33′27″N 34°14′51″E
- Length: 6 km (3.7 mi)

Basin features
- River system: Limonlu Çayı
- Tributaries
  - right: Lamas Çayı (or Susama Deresi)

The Limonlu River (Ancient Greek: Λάμος Lamos; Latin: Lamus), also known as Gökler Deresi, is a river of ancient Cilicia, now in Mersin Province, Turkey.

The river rises at Yüğlük Dağı in the Taurus Mountains and flows through deep gorges to the southwest until it reaches the Mediterranean Sea at Limonlu (the ancient Antiochia Lamotis) in the district of Erdemli. About halfway along its course it is receives the Susama Deresi from the west as a tributary.

In the town of Limonlu, about 500 metres west of the river mouth on a flat hill on the right bank is the medieval castle Lamos Kalesi. Below the castle a Late Ottoman bridge crosses the river, probably on the site of an earlier Roman bridge. North of the town are the remains of an aqueduct, which carried water from the river west to the ancient towns of Elaiussa Sebaste and Corycus.

== History ==
The ancient name of the river was Lamos (Λάμος, Latinised as Lamus, Arabic: اللامس, al-Lāmis). The river formed the boundary between Rough Cilicia (Kilikia Tracheia) to the west and Flat Cilicia (Kilikia Pedias) to the east. At its mouth was the city Antiochia Lamotis, earlier Lamos, formerly the capital of the surrounding region, the Lamotis or Lamusia (Λαμουσία). Later it formed the eastern edge of the Byzantine theme of Seleucia (Silifke), part of the border region of the empire known as the Kleisoura. Thus, the river formed part of the empire's border with the Islamic Caliphate. During the 9th–10th centuries, the river was the site of several Arab–Byzantine prisoner exchanges. The first of these exchanges occurred in 797 or 805 in the reign of the Caliph Harun ar-Rashid and the Byzantine Emperor Nicephorus I. Within twelve days, 3700 Arabic prisoners were released. The final prisoner exchange took place in 946 under Constantine VII and Al-Muti. 2482 Muslim men and women were released, 230 were kept in captivity. Later exchanges took place elsewhere, since it subsequently belonged to the Byzantines.
