= Nikephoros Parsakoutenos =

Nikephoros Parsakoutenos (Greek: Νικηφόρος Παρσακουτηνός) was a Byzantine nobleman and nephew of Emperor Nikephoros II Phokas (r. 963–969).

== Life ==
The family's surname (erroneously spelled Παρσακουντηνός, Parsakountenos, in some manuscripts) derives from the locality of "Parsakoute" (Παρσακούτη). His father, Theodoulos Parsakoutenos, married a lady from the mighty clan of the Phokades, apparently a daughter of the general Bardas Phokas the Elder, father of the general and future emperor Nikephoros II Phokas (reigned 963–969). Nikephoros had two brothers, Theodore and Bardas, and was apparently the youngest of Theodoulos' sons.

According to Arabic sources, in a battle at Hadath on 19 October 954 Theodoulos Parsakoutenos and one of his sons, either Bardas or the younger Nikephoros, were taken prisoner by the Hamdanid emir Sayf al-Dawla. The eldest brother, Theodore, tried to ransom his father and brother for Sayf al-Dawla's cousin Abu Firas, whom he captured in autumn 962, but it was not until a prisoner exchange on 23 June 966 that the Byzantine captives held by Sayf al-Dawla were released.

The Parsakoutenoi supported the rebellion by his cousin Bardas Phokas the Younger against John I Tzimiskes (r. 969–976) in 970, based in Caesarea in Cappadocia. As soon as the loyalist army under Bardas Skleros approached them, however, they defected to the emperor. It is likely that the family was exiled thereafter, and only rehabilitated in 978, when Bardas Phokas himself was recalled to active service by Emperor Basil II (r. 976–1025) to confront the rebellion of Bardas Skleros. In the summer or autumn of 979, after Skleros had been defeated, several of his supporters remained defiant in the forts they controlled, from which they led raids. Nikephoros was sent to the Thracesian Theme, where he persuaded Skleros' partisans to surrender on the promise of an amnesty from the emperor.

== Sources ==
- Lilie, Ralph-Johannes; Ludwig, Claudia; Zielke, Beate; Pratsch, Thomas, eds. (2013). Prosopographie der mittelbyzantinischen Zeit Online. Berlin-Brandenburgische Akademie der Wissenschaften. Nach Vorarbeiten F. Winkelmanns erstellt (in German). De Gruyter.
