= Theodore Parsakoutenos =

Byzantine general

Theodore Parsakoutenos (Greek: Θεόδωρος Παρσακουτηνός) was a Byzantine general in the 960s and nephew of Emperor Nikephoros II Phokas.

== Life ==
The family's surname (erroneously spelled Παρσακουντηνός, Parsakountenos, in some manuscripts) derives from the locality of "Parsakoute" (Παρσακούτη). His father, Theodoulos Parsakoutenos, married a lady from the mighty clan of the Phokades, apparently a daughter of the general Bardas Phokas the Elder, father of the general and future emperor Nikephoros II Phokas (reigned 963–969). Theodore had two (probably younger) brothers, Bardas and Nikephoros.

Theodore is first mentioned in 962, at which time he held the rank of patrikios and the post of strategos of an unnamed theme. He undertook a raid into the Hamdanid domains around Manbij with a force of 1,000 (according to Abu Firas) or 1,300 (according to Ibn Zafir) riders. The local Hamdanid governor, Abu Firas, led out a force of 70 soldiers with which he defeated a detachment of Theodore's men, recovering the plunder they had taken, but on his return to Manbij, Abu Firas was captured and brought as a prisoner to Constantinople. Theodore tried to have his prisoner, a cousin of the Hamdanid emir of Aleppo, Sayf al-Dawla, exchanged for his father and one of his brothers, captured at Hadath in 954, but apparently without success until 966, when Abu Firas and other Arab captives were exchanged for Byzantines held by the Hamdanids.

Shortly after, in December 962, Nikephoros Phokas, then still commander-in-chief (Domestic of the Schools) of the Byzantine army, advanced on Aleppo, taking over the lower town but not the citadel, which continued to resist. Theodore is possibly identifiable as the unnamed nephew of Phokas who on his own initiative attacked the citadel, but was killed by a Daylamite soldier. When his severed head was brought to Phokas, the latter reportedly beheaded 1,200 Arab prisoners.

If he was not killed in 962, then he likely participated along with his brothers in the failed rebellion of their cousin Bardas Phokas the Younger in 970 against John I Tzimiskes (r. 969–976). The Parsakoutenoi tried to drum up support for Phokas at Caesarea, but abandoned him as soon as the imperial army under Bardas Skleros drew near.

== Sources ==
- Lilie, Ralph-Johannes; Ludwig, Claudia; Pratsch, Thomas; Zielke, Beate (2013). Prosopographie der mittelbyzantinischen Zeit Online. Berlin-Brandenburgische Akademie der Wissenschaften. Nach Vorarbeiten F. Winkelmanns erstellt (in German). Berlin and Boston: De Gruyter.
