= Bardas Parsakoutenos =

Bardas Parsakoutenos (Greek: Βάρδας Παρσακουτηνός) was a Byzantine commander and nephew of Emperor Nikephoros II Phokas.

== Life ==
The family's surname (erroneously spelled Παρσακουντηνός, Parsakountenos, in some manuscripts) derives from the locality of "Parsakoute" (Παρσακούτη). His father, Theodoulos Parsakoutenos, married a lady from the mighty clan of the Phokades, apparently a daughter of the general Bardas Phokas the Elder, father of the general and future emperor Nikephoros II Phokas (reigned 963–969). Bardas had two brothers, Theodore and Nikephoros. As he carried his maternal grandfather's name, he was probably the second-born of the three.

According to Arabic sources, in a battle at Hadath on 19 October 954 Theodoulos Parsakoutenos and one of his sons, either Bardas or the younger Nikephoros, were taken prisoner by the Hamdanid emir Sayf al-Dawla. The eldest brother, Theodore, tried to ransom his father and brother for Sayf al-Dawla's cousin Abu Firas, whom he captured in autumn 962, but it was not until a prisoner exchange on 23 June 966 that the Byzantine captives held by Sayf al-Dawla were released.

As supporters of the failed revolt of his cousin Bardas Phokas the Younger against John I Tzimiskes (r. 969–976) in 970, Bardas and his brothers may have been sent into exile. Their exile probably lasted until Phokas himself was recalled in 978 by Emperor Basil II (r. 976–1025) to confront the rebellion of Bardas Skleros. The latter, a distinguished general and Tzimiskes' most senior lieutenant, had rebelled on Tzimiskes' death in 976 and quickly seized control of Asia Minor, repeatedly defeating the loyalist armies. Finally, Basil II's chief minister, the parakoimomenos Basil Lekapenos, was forced to recall Phokas from exile. It is likely that his partisans were pardoned and recalled at the same time. Accordingly, the contemporary historian Leo the Deacon records that in 978 Bardas Parsakoutenos, holding the supreme court rank of magistros, commanded the central Imperial Fleet when it defeated a rebel fleet off Abydos through the use of Greek fire, before going on to disembark his men, defeat the rebel troops on land, and recapture Abydos.

== Sources ==
- Holmes, Catherine (2005). Basil II and the Governance of Empire (976–1025). Oxford: Oxford University Press. ISBN 978-0-19-927968-5.
- Lilie, Ralph-Johannes; Ludwig, Claudia; Pratsch, Thomas; Zielke, Beate (2013). Prosopographie der mittelbyzantinischen Zeit Online. Berlin-Brandenburgische Akademie der Wissenschaften. Nach Vorarbeiten F. Winkelmanns erstellt (in German). Berlin and Boston: De Gruyter.
- Whittow, Mark (1996). The Making of Byzantium, 600–1025. Berkeley and Los Angeles, California: University of California Press. ISBN 978-0-520-20496-6.
