= Theodoulos Parsakoutenos =

Theodoulos Parsakoutenos (Greek: Θεόδουλος Παρσακουτηνός) was a Byzantine general who married into the Phokas clan. He was taken prisoner by the Hamdanid emir Sayf al-Dawla in 954 and remained in captivity until 966.

== Life ==
The family's surname (erroneously spelled Παρσακουντηνός, Parsakountenos, in some manuscripts) derives from the locality of "Parsakoute" (Παρσακούτη). Theodoulos is the first known member of the family, and married a lady from the mighty clan of the Phokades, apparently a daughter of the general Bardas Phokas the Elder, father of the general and future emperor Nikephoros II Phokas (reigned 963–969). Theodoulos and his wife, whose name is unknown, had three sons: Theodore, Bardas, and Nikephoros.

His career is little known, except for some references in Arabic sources, which call him "the One-Eyed" (al-A‘war) and record that he was a patrikios and commander (strategos) of the themes of Tzamandos and Lykandos in 954, when he was captured along with one of his sons (either Bardas or Nikephoros) at Hadath by the Hamdanid emir of Aleppo, Sayf al-Dawla.

In autumn 962, Theodoulos' son Theodore captured Sayf al-Dawla's cousin, Abu Firas al-Hamdani, in a raid, and tried to have his prisoner exchanged for his father and one of his brothers. This was without immediate success, as Abu Firas remained a captive until the prisoner exchange of 966, when Theodoulos and any other high-ranking Byzantine captives were probably also exchanged.

== Sources ==
- Lilie, Ralph-Johannes; Ludwig, Claudia; Zielke, Beate; Pratsch, Thomas, eds. (2013). "Prosopographie der mittelbyzantinischen Zeit Online". Prosopographie der mittelbyzantinischen Zeit Online. Berlin-Brandenburgische Akademie der Wissenschaften. Nach Vorarbeiten F. Winkelmanns erstellt (in German). De Gruyter.
