= Leo Phokas =

Leo Phokas or Phocas may refer to:

- Leo Phokas the Elder, Byzantine general in the early 10th century
- Leo Phokas the Younger, great-nephew of the above, Byzantine general in the mid-10th century
