= John Garidas =

John Garidas (Greek: Ἰωάννης Γαριδᾶς, fl. 900–919) was a Byzantine military officer who played an important role in the court politics of the early 10th century.

== Life ==
John Garidas is first mentioned in the year 900, during the reign of Leo VI the Wise (reigned 886–912). At the time, he was probably a member of the imperial bodyguard, the Hetaireia, and was charged with arresting the commander of the Hetaireia (hetaireiarches), Nicholas Zaoutzes, whose son, Basil, had led an abortive plot against the emperor. During the attempted coup by the general Constantine Doukas on 6 June 913, he remained loyal to the young emperor Constantine VII (r. 913–949) and was the one who killed, according to the Vita Euthymii, Constantine Doukas' son Gregory. By this time, he already held the senior rank of patrikios.

In 914, he was named to the post of hetaireiarches by the Empress-dowager and regent Zoe Karbonopsina after his predecessor, Theophylact Dominikos, was also involved in a plot to seize the throne. In fall/winter 917, still as hetaireiarches, Garidas took part in the campaign against the Bulgarians under the Domestic of the Schools Leo Phokas the Elder. Leo Phokas had already suffered a heavy defeat at the Battle of Acheloos, in whose aftermath the Bulgarians had invaded Byzantine lands in Thrace. The campaign ended in yet another heavy Byzantine defeat at the Battle of Katasyrtai, when the Bulgarians launched a surprise night attack on the Byzantine camp and routed the imperial army. Garidas and Leo Phokas barely escaped with a few troops, and sought refuge behind the city walls of Constantinople.

In early 919, Constantine VII and the Patriarch of Constantinople Nicholas I Mystikos toppled Zoe as regent. As they feared a possible usurpation by Leo Phokas, they dismissed him from the Domesticate and appointed Garidas, by now a magistros, in his stead. Garidas agreed, on the condition that his son Symeon and his brother-in-law Theodore Zephinezer be appointed as joint commanders of the Hetaireia, something which would effectively give Garidas control of the imperial government. The emperor and the patriarch agreed to his demands, but as soon as Garidas had left the palace to return to his home, they evicted Symeon and Theodore from the palace. As a result, Garidas, fearful of his own life, turned to the admiral Romanos Lekapenos, and became his supporter. Lekapenos now emerged as a strong contender for the throne, and in a series of moves, secured control of the imperial government, neutralized Leo Phokas, and gained promotion first to basileopator and finally to senior co-emperor on 17 December 919.

== Sources ==
- Guilland, Rodolphe (1967). "Le Domestique des Scholes". Recherches sur les institutions byzantines [Studies on the Byzantine Institutions]. Berliner byzantinische Arbeiten 35 (in French). Vol. I. Berlin and Amsterdam: Akademie-Verlag & Adolf M. Hakkert. pp. 426–468. OCLC 878894516.
- Lilie, Ralph-Johannes; Ludwig, Claudia; Pratsch, Thomas; Zielke, Beate (2013). Prosopographie der mittelbyzantinischen Zeit Online. Berlin-Brandenburgische Akademie der Wissenschaften. Nach Vorarbeiten F. Winkelmanns erstellt (in German). Berlin and Boston: De Gruyter.
- Runciman, Steven (1988) [1929]. The Emperor Romanus Lecapenus and His Reign: A Study of Tenth-Century Byzantium. Cambridge: Cambridge University Press. ISBN 0-521-35722-5.

Preceded by Leo Phokas the Elder	Domestic of the Schools; 919	Succeeded by Adralestos
