= Constantine Helladikos =

Byzantine aristocrat

Constantine Helladikos or Eladikos (Greek: Κωνσταντῖνος ὁ Ἑλλαδικός/Ἐλαδικός) was a Byzantine aristocrat who joined the general Constantine Doukas in the latter's failed usurpation attempt in June 913. After the death of Doukas, Helladikos was whipped and paraded through the streets of Constantinople on a donkey, before being confined to the Dalmatos monastery. Nothing further is known of him. The sources refer to him as "patrikios and monk", but it is unclear whether he was already a monk before Doukas' coup attempt or whether this refers to his subsequent confinement.

== Sources ==
- Lilie, Ralph-Johannes; Ludwig, Claudia; Pratsch, Thomas; Zielke, Beate (2013). Prosopographie der mittelbyzantinischen Zeit Online. Berlin-Brandenburgische Akademie der Wissenschaften. Nach Vorarbeiten F. Winkelmanns erstellt (in German). Berlin and Boston: De Gruyter.
