= Theodotos Kalothetos =

Theodotos Kalothetos (Greek: Θεόδοτος Καλόθετος, fl. 1250s) was a senior official and governor in the Empire of Nicaea.

Little is known about his life. He was a native of Ephesus, and an uncle to the future emperor Michael VIII Palaiologos. He held the high military post of Domestic of the Schools in the early 1250s, but was derided for his lack of cultivation in a letter by Emperor Theodore II Laskaris (r. 1254–58). He is attested again in 1259, when he sided with the monk Gabriel, of the monastery of St. Gregory Thaumatourgos, in his dispute with Nikephoros Blemmydes. At that time, he held the court rank of pansebastos sebastos and was governor of extensive territory in western Anatolia comprising the Thracesian Theme, Melanoudion, Pyrgion and Kaloe.

== Sources ==
- Guilland, Rodolphe (1967). "Le Domestique des Scholes". Recherches sur les institutions byzantines [Studies on the Byzantine Institutions]. Berliner byzantinische Arbeiten 35 (in French). Vol. I. Berlin and Amsterdam: Akademie-Verlag & Adolf M. Hakkert. pp. 426–468. OCLC 878894516.
- Trapp, Erich; Walther, Rainer; Beyer, Hans-Veit; Sturm-Schnabl, Katja (1981). "10607. Καλόθετος Θεόδοτος". Prosopographisches Lexikon der Palaiologenzeit (in German). Vol. 5. Vienna: Verlag der Österreichischen Akademie der Wissenschaften. ISBN 3-7001-3003-1.
