= Nikephoros Phokas the Elder =

Byzantine general (9th century AD)

Nikephoros Phokas
- Died: 895/6 or c. 900
- Relatives: Bardas Phokas the Elder and Leo Phokas the Elder (sons)
- Military career
- Allegiance: Byzantine Empire
- Service years: c. 872–895/6
- Rank: Domestic of the Schools
- Wars: Arab–Byzantine wars in Asia Minor and southern Italy, Byzantine–Bulgarian wars

Nikephoros Phokas (Greek: Νικηφόρος Φωκᾶς, romanized: Nikēphoros Phōkas; died 895/6 or c. 900), usually surnamed the Elder to distinguish him from his grandson, Emperor Nikephoros II Phokas, was one of the most prominent Byzantine generals of the late 9th century, and the first important member of the Phokas family. As a youth he was taken into the personal retinue of Emperor Basil I the Macedonian, rising quickly to the posts of protostrator and then governor of Charsianon, whence he fought with success against the Arabs. In c. 886 he led a major expedition in southern Italy, where his victories laid the foundation for the Byzantine resurgence in the peninsula. After his return, he was raised to the post of Domestic of the Schools, in effect commander-in-chief of the army, which he led with success against the Arabs in the east and the Bulgarians of Tsar Simeon in the Balkans. He died either in 895/6 or, less likely, sometime c. 900. Contemporaries and later historians lauded him for his military ability and character. Both of his sons later succeeded him as Domestics of the Schools. His grandsons Nikephoros and Leo were likewise distinguished generals, while the former became emperor in 963–969, spearheading the recovery of several lost provinces from the Arabs.

== Life ==
=== Early life and career ===
Nikephoros was the son of the founder of the Phokas family, a man called Phokas, a native of Cappadocia. During one of the campaigns of Emperor Basil I the Macedonian (r. 867–886) sometime in the 870s (probably c. 872), Nikephoros' father caught the emperor's attention and was raised to the rank of tourmarches. At the same time Nikephoros, still in his youth, was taken into the imperial retinue, and was soon appointed to the guard corps of the manglabitai. He possibly participated in Basil's 873 campaign against Samosata.

Shortly after, at any rate before 878, Nikephoros was promoted to the rank of protostrator and received from the emperor his own palace in the vicinity of the Church of St. Thecla. Eventually he rose to the post of military governor (strategos) of the theme of Charsianon, a post from which, according to the continuators of Georgios Monachos, he scored "numerous" but unspecified successes against the Arabs.

=== Command in southern Italy ===
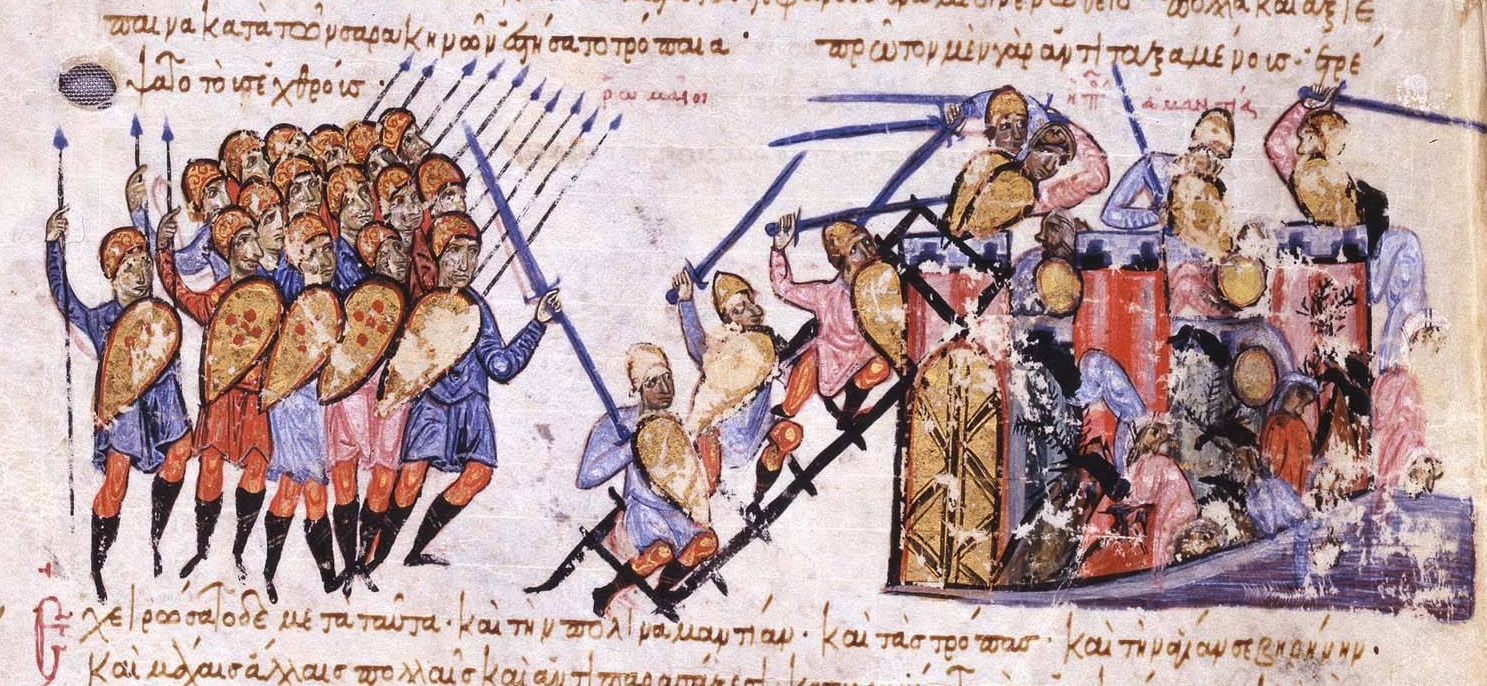
Byzantine troops under Nikephoros Phokas capture the town of Amantia in Italy. Miniature from the Madrid Skylitzes

Nikephoros remained in command of Charsianon until his appointment as the commander-in-chief (monostrategos, "single-general") against the Arabs in southern Italy in replacement of Stephen Maxentios, who had been defeated by the Arabs. This took place in 885, according to traditional dating. It is likely, however, that Nikephoros was originally sent to Italy already before that, at the head of a picked detachment of troops from Charsianon, which Theophanes Continuatus records as part of Maxentios' expeditionary force. His command involved the forces of several western themes (Thrace, Macedonia, Cephallenia, Longobardia and Calabria), but Theophanes Continuatus also reports that Nikephoros received further reinforcements from the themes of Asia Minor, including a Paulician detachment. Nikephoros' command in Italy lasted until his recall to Constantinople following the accession of Leo VI the Wise, in late 886. Shaun Tougher however posits that Nikephoros was sent to Italy only after the accession of Leo VI, as Leo in his writings takes credit for his dispatch there, and that his recall was not until c. 887.

Byzantium had been absent from the affairs of southern Italy for almost a century, but the accession of Basil the Macedonian changed this: from 868 on, the imperial fleet and diplomacy were employed in an effort to secure the Adriatic Sea from Saracen raids, re-establish Byzantine dominance over Dalmatia, and extend Byzantine control once more over parts of Italy. Otranto was taken from the Saracens in 873, and Bari in 876. According to the Byzantine sources, during his tenure in Italy Nikephoros recovered numerous towns taken by the Arabs in the previous years, including Taranto, Bari, Santa Severina, Rhegion and Taormina, Tropai and especially Amantia, which Maxentios had previously attacked without success. According to the continuators of Georgios Monachos, he was besieging Amantia when news came of Emperor Basil's death and his own recall by Leo VI; Nikephoros kept the news a secret until he had persuaded the Arab garrison to surrender on guarantee of safe passage. During his time in Italy he also took steps to strengthen the Byzantine position by settling many Armenians in the region, as well as 1,000 manumitted slaves donated by Emperor Basil's old benefactor, the widow Danielis. The 11th-century historian John Skylitzes furthermore reports that Nikephoros brought an end to abuse against the local population, by ending the practice of returning Byzantine soldiers carrying off local Italians to be sold off in the East as slaves. According to Skylitzes, the grateful Italians dedicated a church in his honour. By the time of his departure, he had extended Byzantine control over most of Apulia and Calabria. These victories were followed up by his successors and laid the foundation of a resurgence of Byzantine power in southern Italy, culminating in the establishment of the theme of Longobardia in c. 892. The regions of Apulia, Calabria and Basilicata would remain firmly under Byzantine control until the 11th century.

=== Domestic of the Schools and the war with Bulgaria ===
His successes in Italy secured Nikephoros a friendly welcome and honours on his return to Constantinople, but he is not mentioned again for several years, until the outbreak of war with Bulgaria in 894. In the meantime, he was raised to the rank of patrikios and named to the post of Domestic of the Schools, in effect commander-in-chief of the Byzantine army, after the death of his predecessor, Andrew the Scythian.

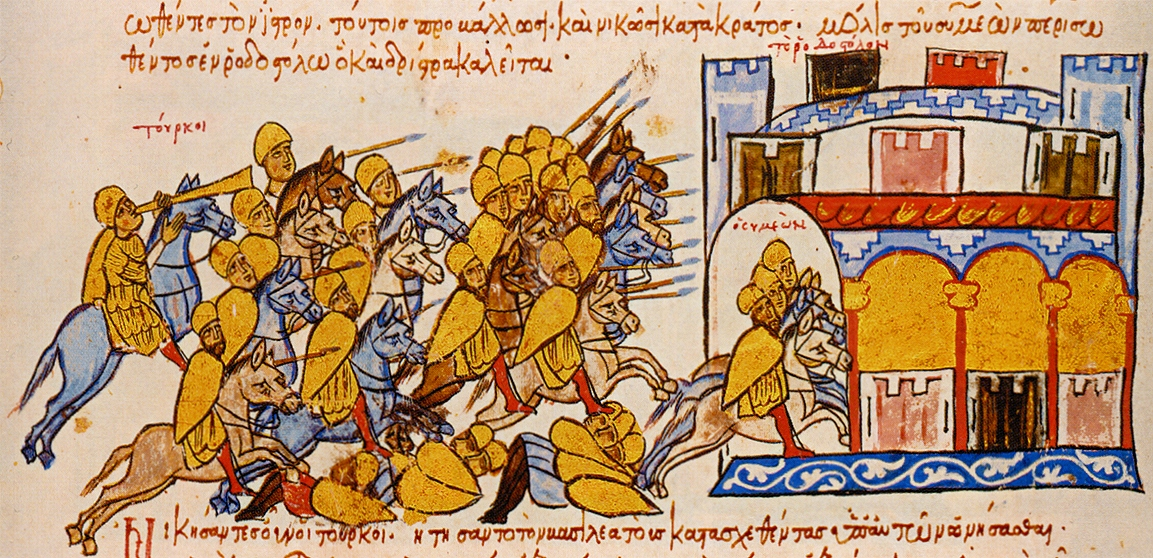
The Magyars pursue Simeon to Dorystolon, miniature from the Madrid Skylitzes

In 895, he was sent against the Bulgarians at the head of a large army. It is unclear whether Nikephoros engaged the Bulgarians in battle, for a Byzantine-instigated invasion by the Magyars from the north, and the activities of the Byzantine navy in the Danube, forced the Bulgarian ruler Simeon to ask for a truce, and the Byzantines withdrew.

This is the last campaign associated with Nikephoros Phokas, and Symeon Logothetes reports that he died in 895/6. His death reportedly encouraged Tsar Simeon to reopen hostilities, with devastating success against Nikephoros' successor as Domestic, Leo Katakalon. The later chronicle of Theophanes Continuatus, however, reports a different story, according to which Nikephoros was disgraced and dismissed from his post after refusing proposals for a marriage alliance with Leo's powerful chief minister, Stylianos Zaoutzes. After a period out of office, Nikephoros was then appointed strategos either of Charsianon or of the Thracesian Theme, spending his remaining years, until his death around 900, fighting against the Arabs. Leo VI's Tactica and the later De velitatione further mention a successful raid into the Arab lands of Cilicia led by Nikephoros, in retaliation of an Arab attack on the fortress of Mistheia in the Anatolic Theme. While directing the strategoi of the Anatolics and of the Opsician Theme to deal with the Arab invasion, Nikephoros led his forces to raid the vicinity of Adana, making many prisoners, and confounded the Arabs by following a different course on his return, thereby avoiding the Arab army sent to block his retreat. This undated raid probably took place either in the years before or directly after the Bulgarian war.

No definite conclusion as to the date of Nikephoros' death can be reached today, but most modern scholars, such as Jean-Claude Cheynet, are doubtful of the version of Theophanes Continuatus. It would have been very unusual for a former Domestic to be appointed to the subordinate position of a thematic strategos, and there is reason to doubt the authenticity of the tale of Zaoutzes' seeing in Nikephoros a potential future emperor and offering the hand of an—otherwise unknown—daughter in marriage.

=== Assessment and family ===
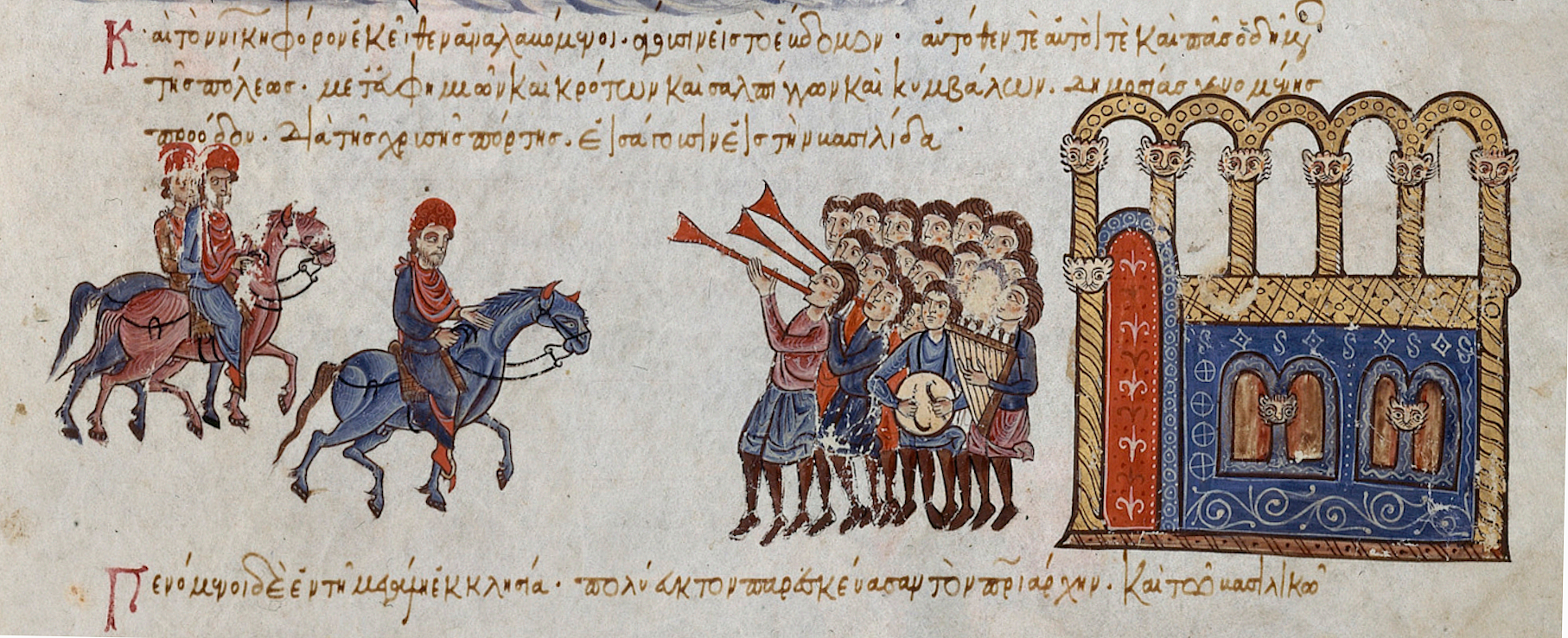
Nikephoros II enters Constantinople as emperor through the Golden Gate in 963

By all accounts, Nikephoros Phokas was a capable soldier. Leo VI lauds his military talents in his Tactica, and he is credited with the invention of a weapon to counter cavalry during his campaign against the Bulgarians, consisting of a sharpened stake driven into the ground. Skylitzes assesses him as a "brave and prudent man, pious towards God and just towards men".

Nikephoros was the father of Bardas Phokas the Elder and Leo Phokas the Elder, both of whom became Domestics of the Schools. So did his grandsons through Bardas, Nikephoros and Leo Phokas the Younger, with the first becoming emperor as Nikephoros II in 963–969. Both Leo and Nikephoros II scored major successes against the Arabs, with Nikephoros in particular leading the recovery of Crete, Cyprus, Cilicia and Antioch.

== Sources ==
- Guilland, Rodolphe (1967). "Le Domestique des Scholes". Recherches sur les institutions byzantines [Studies on the Byzantine Institutions]. Berliner byzantinische Arbeiten 35 (in French). Vol. I. Berlin and Amsterdam: Akademie-Verlag & Adolf M. Hakkert. pp. 426–468. OCLC 878894516.
- Kazhdan, Alexander (1991). "Phokas". In Kazhdan, Alexander (ed.). The Oxford Dictionary of Byzantium. Oxford and New York: Oxford University Press. pp. 1665–1666. ISBN 0-19-504652-8.
- Kreutz, Barbara M. (1996). Before the Normans: Southern Italy in the Ninth and Tenth Centuries. Philadelphia: University of Pennsylvania Press. ISBN 0-8122-1587-7.
- Lilie, Ralph-Johannes; Ludwig, Claudia; Pratsch, Thomas; Zielke, Beate (2013). Prosopographie der mittelbyzantinischen Zeit Online. Berlin-Brandenburgische Akademie der Wissenschaften. Nach Vorarbeiten F. Winkelmanns erstellt (in German). Berlin and Boston: De Gruyter.
- Stankovic, Vlada (2003). "Nikephoros Phokas (the Old)". Encyclopedia of the Hellenic World, Asia Minor. Foundation of the Hellenic World.
- Tougher, Shaun (1997). The Reign of Leo VI (886–912): Politics and People. BRILL. ISBN 978-90-04-10811-0.

Preceded by Andrew the Scythian	Domestic of the Schools; 887/894 – 895/6	Succeeded by Leo Katakalon
