= Andronikos Doukas (general under Leo VI) =

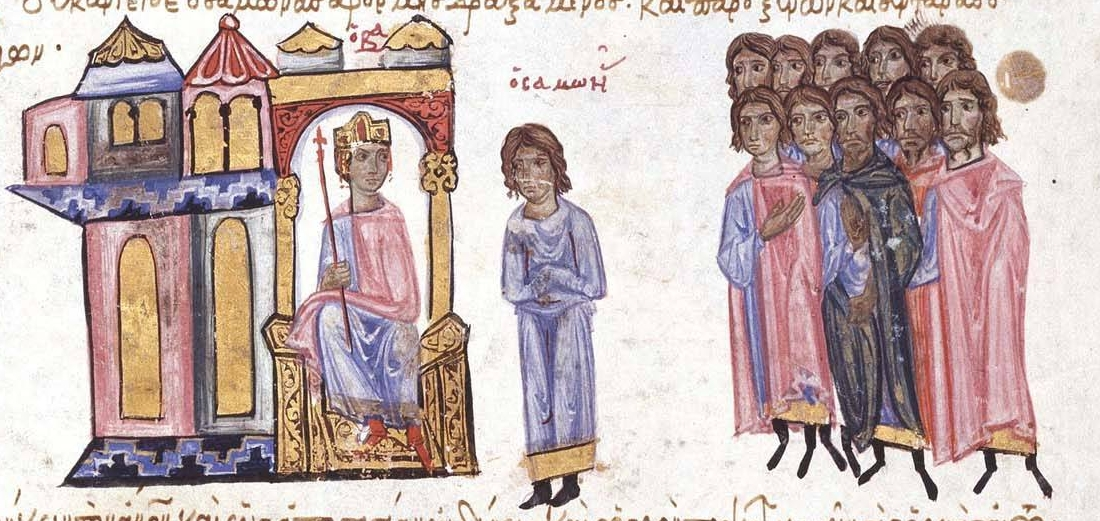
- Died: c. 910; Baghdad
- Relatives: Constantine Doukas (son)
- Military career
- Allegiance: Byzantine Empire
- Rank: Domestic of the Schools

Andronikos Doukas or Doux (Greek: Ἀνδρόνικος Δούκας/Δούξ, died circa 910) was a Byzantine general and rebel in the reign of Emperor Leo VI the Wise (r. 886–912). The first member of the illustrious Doukas line to achieve prominence as a successful general, his rivalry with the powerful eunuch Samonas led to his revolt and eventual defection to the Arabs in 906–907. He died in exile in Baghdad.

== Biography ==
Andronikos Doukas is the first prominent member of the Doukas family whose life is known in some detail. He was possibly the son of the first recorded Doukas, an official active circa 855, but nothing is known of his origin and early life. Andronikos first appears in the sources in 904, already a holder of the exalted title of patrikios and a general. In November or December of that year, along with Eustathios Argyros, he campaigned against the Arabs and won a major victory over the combined forces of Mopsuestia and Tarsos near Germanikeia. Alexander Vasiliev suggested that this campaign was possibly waged in retaliation of the Arab sack of Thessalonica, the Byzantine Empire's second-largest city, a few months earlier. Probably after his victory, he was raised to the rank of Domestic of the Schools, i.e. commander-in-chief of the Empire's army. In 906, he was ordered west to the Aegean coast to join forces with the fleet under Himerios, in order to confront a large Arab naval expedition. Andronikos, however, was reluctant to comply, fearing for his safety: he had received letters from Constantinople warning him that Himerios had been given orders to seize and blind him. In fact, the chroniclers relate that these letters had been sent through the machinations of the eunuch Samonas, Leo's influential Arab-born chamberlain. Samonas bore a personal grudge against the Doukas family ever since Andronikos's son Constantine had seized him during an attempted flight to his native lands a few years earlier. The repeated pleas of Himerios to join him only made Andronikos more suspicious, and he firmly refused to board the former's flagship. In the event, Himerios departed with his own forces and on 6 October secured a major victory over the Arab fleet. At the news of this, Andronikos, fearing punishment for having disobeyed the Emperor's commands, withdrew east with his family and dependants and seized the fortress of Kaballa, near Iconium.

There he held out for some six months, while Leo sent the new Domestic of the Schools, Gregoras Iberitzes, a relative by marriage to the Doukai, to persuade him to surrender. However, when Andronikos heard the news of the deposition of his friend the Patriarch Nicholas Mystikos (February 907), on whom he had placed hopes for mediation, he resolved to flee and asked for aid from the Arabs. In mid-spring 907, an Arab force came to his aid and broke the leaguer around Kaballa. Escorted by the Arabs, Andronikos and his family crossed the border, coming first to Tarsos and finally to the Abbasid capital, Baghdad. The flight of Andronikos Doukas represents a peculiar episode: several scholars, such as Alexander Vasiliev and Romilly Jenkins, consider it evidence of a real plot against Leo, which included the Patriarch Nicholas Mystikos and perhaps also the admiral Eustathios. Others, such as Demetrios Polemis and Shaun Tougher, reject this interpretation and explain the episode in terms of the rivalry with the powerful Samonas. They regard Andronikos's actions to have been purely defensive in character and mandated by his untenable position after his refusal to cooperate with Himerios.

Despite Andronikos's defection – or because of it, considering that Leo of Tripoli and Damian of Tarsus, Byzantium's most dangerous opponents at the time, were Byzantine renegades – Leo was determined to retrieve him. Personal sympathies also played a role: Leo was evidently attached to his general, and even wrote a poem in lamentation of his defection. Consequently, the Emperor sent Andronikos a secret message guaranteeing a safe return, hidden inside a candle. Samonas, however, contrived for this to fall in the hands of the Caliph's vizier, discrediting the general in the Arabs' eyes. Andronikos was then imprisoned in Baghdad and forced to convert to Islam. He probably died there soon after. His son Constantine, on the other hand, soon managed to escape Baghdad and return to Byzantium, where he was pardoned by Leo and entrusted with senior military commands.

== Legacy ==
The careers of both Andronikos and Constantine, who in 913 also mounted an unsuccessful bid for the throne that cost him his life, entered folk legend and partly inspired the epic poem Digenes Akritas.

== Sources ==
- Kazhdan, Alexander, ed. (1991). The Oxford Dictionary of Byzantium. Oxford and New York: Oxford University Press. ISBN 0-19-504652-8.
- Polemis, Demetrios I. (1968). The Doukai: A Contribution to Byzantine Prosopography. London: The Athlone Press.
- Tougher, Shaun (1997). The Reign of Leo VI (886-912): Politics and People. Leiden: Brill. ISBN 978-9-00-410811-0.

| Preceded by Leo Katakalon | Domestic of the Schools ca. 904–906 | Succeeded by Gregoras Iberitzes |
