= Gregoras Iberitzes =

Gregoras Iberitzes (Greek: Γρηγορᾶς Ἰβηρίτζης) was a Byzantine nobleman and senior military leader of the early 10th century.

== Life ==
Gregoras' surname may suggest an Iberian origin. He was related by marriage to the powerful Doukas clan, with whom his career was intertwined. He was almost certainly the father-in-law of Constantine Doukas, son of general Andronikos Doukas. When the latter rose in revolt in the winter of 906/7, possibly due to the machinations of the powerful eunuch Samonas, Gregoras, who at the time held the supreme military position of Domestic of the Schools, was sent by Emperor Leo VI the Wise (reigned 886–912) to confront the Doukai, who had taken refuge in the fortress of Kabala near Ikonion. Andronikos however called upon the Arabs for aid, and in spring of 907, an army under the Abbasid governor of Tarsus, Rustam ibn Baradu, arrived to help him. According to al-Tabari, Andronikos managed to take Gregoras captive, defeat his troops, and flee to the Abbasid Caliphate.

At a later point, but no later than the reign of Leo's brother and successor, Alexander (r. 912–913), Gregoras Iberitzes rose to the supreme court rank of magistros. As a result, he is possibly to be identified with the nameless magistros who in late 912 delivered letters from the emperor and Patriarch Nicholas I Mystikos to Pope Anastasius III. Following Alexander's death on 6 June 913, Constantine Doukas tried to seize the throne. He entered Constantinople and spent the night in the mansion of Gregoras, where he planned his action with his followers. The usurpation attempt failed with the death of Constantine in the ensuing melee at the imperial palace, whereupon Gregoras and Leo Choirosphaktes sought sanctuary in the Hagia Sophia. They were forcibly removed, tonsured as monks, and sent to the Stoudios Monastery.

Gregoras' mansion, which lay in the acropolis of ancient Byzantium, apparently passed to John Toubakes.

== Sources ==
- Lilie, Ralph-Johannes; Ludwig, Claudia; Pratsch, Thomas; Zielke, Beate (2013). Prosopographie der mittelbyzantinischen Zeit Online. Berlin-Brandenburgische Akademie der Wissenschaften. Nach Vorarbeiten F. Winkelmanns erstellt (in German). Berlin and Boston: De Gruyter.
