= Domestic of the Schools =

Military post of the Byzantine Empire, extant from the 8c

The office of the Domestic of the Schools (Greek: δομέστικος τῶν σχολῶν, romanized: doméstikos tôn scholôn) was a senior military post of the Byzantine Empire, extant from the 8th century until at least the early 14th century. Originally simply the commander of the Scholai, the senior of the elite tagmata regiments, the Domestic quickly rose in prominence: by the mid-9th century, its holders essentially occupied the position of commander-in-chief of the Byzantine army, next to the Emperor. The office was eclipsed in the 12th century by that of the Grand Domestic, and in the Palaiologan period (13th–15th centuries), it was reduced to a purely honorary, mid-level court dignity.

== History ==
The first holder of the office of Domestic of the Schools first appears in the sources (the chronicle of Theophanes the Confessor) for the year 767, shortly after the creation of the tagmata. These were elite cavalry regiments stationed in or around the capital Constantinople, commanded by officers titled "Domestics" (δομέστικοι, domestikoi) and distinct from the provincial armies of the themes under their respective stratēgoi. The Schools (Latin: scholae; Greek: σχολαὶ, scholai) was the senior tagma, tracing their origin to the Scholae Palatinae established by Constantine the Great (r. 306–337) and originally placed under the command of the magister officiorum. The historian J.B. Bury has traced a reference to a certain Anianos, "Domestic of the magister", in the Chronicon Paschale for the year 624, and considers this official to be the predecessor of the Domestic of the Schools. As the magister officiorum was gradually deprived of some of his functions in the 7th and 8th centuries, the Domestic apparently became an independent official. The Kletorologion of 899 lists his subordinate officials as comprising his deputy or topotērētēs (τοποτηρητής), the secretary or chartoularios (χαρτουλάριος), the head messenger or proximos (πρόξιμος) and the other messengers (μανδάτορες, mandatores), as well as the various subordinate officers of the regiment (cf. the article on the Scholae Palatinae).

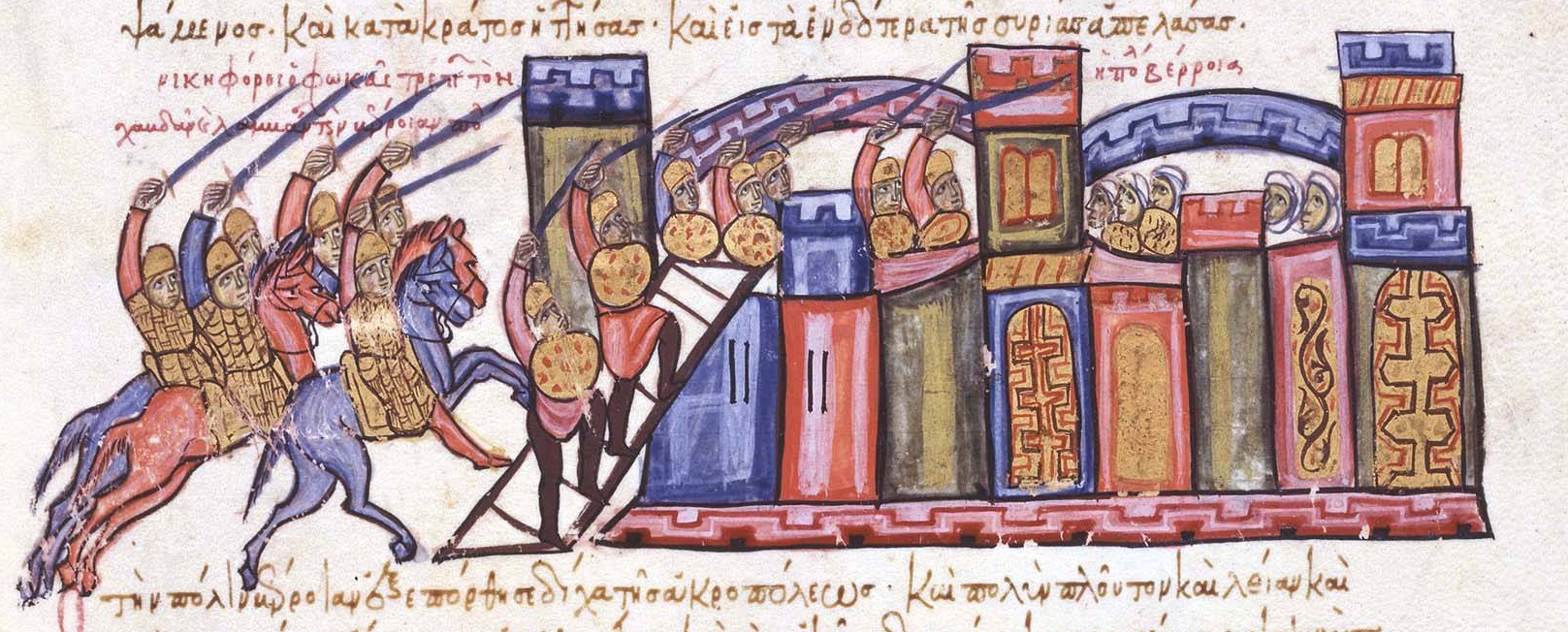
The troops of the Domestic of the Schools Nikephoros Phokas storm Aleppo in 962

In the 9th century, the office of the Domestic, or "Domesticate" (δομεστικάτον, domestikaton), of the Schools rose in importance and its holder was often appointed as the head of the army in the absence of the emperor. However, this role was not yet enshrined: it depended rather on the abilities of the current Domestic, and other generals of inferior rank were sometimes entrusted with supreme command instead. The Domestic of the Schools nevertheless rose to such prominence that the sources frequently speak of the office as "the Domestic" without further qualification, and the power and influence of the post saw it frequently occupied by persons closely related to the emperor. From the time of Michael III (r. 842–867) on, the Domestic ranked in the imperial hierarchy above all other military commanders except for the stratēgos of the Anatolic Theme. In practice, he quickly became senior even to the latter, as demonstrated by the fact that military leaders like Nikephoros Phokas and John Tzimiskes were promoted from the generalship of the Anatolics to the Domesticate.

In the reign of Romanos II (r. 959–963) the post was split, with a "Domestic of the West" (δομέστικος τῆς δύσεως, domestikos tēs dyseōs) and a "Domestic of the East" (δομέστικος τῆς ἀνατολῆς, domestikos tēs anatolēs) being created for operations in Europe and Asia respectively. The command of the Schools regiment then passed to the Domestic's deputy, the topotērētēs, although it appears that by that time there were several officers occupying that position at the same time. The ceremony for the Domestic's appointment is described in the De Ceremoniis (II.3); the same work describes his duties and role in court ceremonies.

With some exceptions, most notably the unparalleled 22-year tenure of John Kourkouas, or in times of domestic instability, Domestics were changed on the average every three to four years. During the 10th century, the Domesticate of the Schools was dominated by members of the Phokas family, which produced six holders of the office. Their attempts to monopolize the office led a series of emperors, concerned over the power of the military aristocracy, to entrust the potentially over-powerful office to non-military court officials, including—especially in the first half of the 11th century, before the military aristocracy reasserted its authority—to eunuchs, even though this was in theory forbidden, with the alternate office of stratopedarches having been created for this purpose.

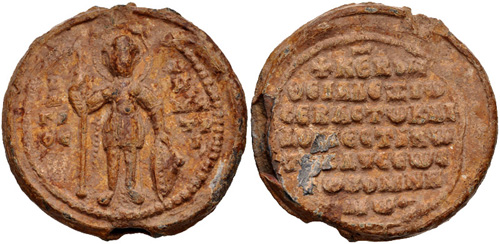
Lead seal of Alexios I Komnenos as "Grand Domestic of the West"

In the 10th and 11th centuries, the variant "Grand Domestic" (μέγας δομέστικος, megas domestikos) appears sporadically, used in parallel with other variants such as "Grand Domestic of the Schools" or "Grand Domestic of the East/West" for the same person. The Byzantinist Rodolphe Guilland considers most of these early references either as anachronistic references by 12th-century writers, or simply cases where "megas" is used as an honorific prefix, as was the norm with other senior offices during this period, like the Drungary of the Watch or the Domestic of the Excubitors. Nevertheless, Guilland argues that from the time of Alexios I Komnenos (r. 1081–1118) on, the "Grand Domestic" became a separate office, senior to the "plain" Domestics of the Schools and in effect the new commander-in-chief of the army beside the Emperor. However, the usage of the titles is not consistent, and the habitual division of command between East and West seems to have been sometimes applied to the Grand Domesticate as well during the 12th century, causing some confusion as to the nature of the office and its relation to the "plain" Domestic. In the 13th century however the two titles became clearly distinct: the Grand Domestic was the commander-in-chief of the entire army and one of the highest offices of state, while the Domestic of the Schools was relegated to a simple dignity without duties, awarded to provincial governors and other middle-ranking officials. In the words of the mid-14th century Book of Offices of Pseudo-Kodinos, "the Domestic of the Schools once had an office similar to that of the Grand Domestic currently, but he now holds none".

In Pseudo-Kodinos' work, the Domestic of the Schools ranks 31st in the imperial hierarchy, between the mystikos and the Grand Drungary of the Fleet. The Domestic's distinctive court dress, as reported by Pseudo-Kodinos, consisted of a gold-brocaded hat (skiadion), a plain silk kabbadion tunic and a silver staff (dikanikion) with a knob on top and another in the middle. For ceremonies and festivities, he bore the domed skaranikon, of lemon-yellow silk and decorated with gold wire embroidery, and with a portrait of the emperor seated on a throne in front and another with the emperor on horseback on the rear.

== List of known holders ==
Name	Tenure	Notes	Refs
Appointed by Constantine V (780–797)
Antony Patrikios	c. 767 – c. 780	A patrikios and staunch iconoclast and close aide of Constantine V, he remained in office until the early regency of Irene of Athens	
Appointed by Eirene (797–802)
Bardanios Patrikios	c. 795/796	A patrikios, probably the same as Bardanes Tourkos.	
Peter Patrikios	c. 797 – 802	Son of a patrikios and a patrikios himself, little is known of his career. He was named to the post by Irene of Athens (some modern sources name Nikephoros I instead), and became domestic of the Hikanatoi under Nikephoros. He was taken captive at the Battle of Pliska, becoming a monk afterwards. He was canonized by the church. Kühn suggests that "Peter" may have been the monastic name of the aforementioned Stephen.	
Niketas Triphyllios Patrikios	c. 797 – 803	A patrikios, he supported the eunuch Aetios and later the usurpation of Nikephoros I, but died soon after, perhaps poisoned on the latter's orders, on 30 April 803.	
Appointed by Nikephoros I (802–811)
Stephen Patrikios	c. 811	A patrikios, he survived the disastrous Battle of Pliska and managed to enforce the succession of Nikephoros' son Staurakios.	
Appointed by Michael I Rangabe (811–813)
Anonymous	c. 813	An unnamed "grand domestic", likely a reference to a Domestic of the Schools, is mentioned by the Scriptor Incertus after the Battle of Versinikia.	
Appointed by Theophilos (829–842)
Manuel the Armenian Magistros	829–858?	An experienced general, he was given the post along with the title of magistros after returning from a defection to the Arabs. He participated in several campaigns against the Arabs. Some sources claim he died in 838 following the Battle of Anzen, but other sources claim that he lived long after that and became regent for the young Michael III.	
Appointed by Michael III (842–867)
Bardas Kouropalates	858–861/2	Uncle of Michael III, he was appointed magistros and Domestic of the Schools after the banishment of the Empress-dowager Theodora. Promoted to kouropalatēs and eventually Caesar, as the virtual regent of the Empire he rarely exercised his military function, which he delegated to his son Antigonos and his brother Petronas.	
Antigonos	861/2; 865–866	Son of the Caesar Bardas, he had been conferred the Domesticate as an honorary appointment already at the age of nine or ten years. He succeeded his uncle Petronas as regular Domestic after the latter's retirement and death, but was unable to prevent the murder of his father by Basil the Macedonian and was removed from his post after that.	
Petronas Magistros	863–865	Uncle of Michael III and an active general. He exercised the high command in place of his brother Bardas and was raised to the Domesticate and the rank of magistros following his victory over the Arabs at the Battle of Lalakaon. He retired to a monastery soon after.	
Appointed by Basil I (867–886)
Marianos Anthypatos Patrikios	c. 867	Brother of Basil I, he took part in Michael III's assassination and died soon after; his tomb at the convent of St. Euphemia and a seal of office record his post as a Domestic of the Schools. He was also logothetēs tōn agelōn and bore the rank of anthypatos patrikios.	
Christopher Magistros	872	Son-in-law of Basil I and a magistros, little is known of him except that he led the Byzantine forces to victory over the Paulicians at the Battle of Bathys Ryax.	
Andrew the Scythian Magistros	c. 877 – 883; 884 – 887/8	Of unknown (possibly Slavic/Russian) origin, he was named Domestic, patrikios and magistros following his exploits against the Arabs. Dismissed following court intrigues, he was reinstated after his successor was routed by the Arabs and retained the post into the early reign of Leo VI the Wise, probably up to his death in 887/8.	
Kesta Styppiotes	883/4	Probably hailing from Štip, he was defeated and possibly killed near Tarsus by Yazaman al-Khadim, soon after his appointment, leading to the reinstatement of Andrew the Scythian.	
Appointed by Leo VI (886–912)
Nikephoros Phokas the Elder Patrikios	887/8 – 893/4	Celebrated for his exploits in southern Italy, he was named to the Domesticate after the death of Andrew the Scythian and served, mostly in the East, probably until 893/4 (or possibly 895).	
Leo Katakalon	893/4 – 900s	A commander of the palace guard and relative of Patriarch Photios. After succeeding Nikephoros Phokas, he led the Byzantine army to successful expeditions in the east, and then in the disastrous Battle of Boulgarophygon in 896, but survived and continued in office until the early 900s (decade).	
Andronikos Doukas Patrikios	c. 904–906	He was appointed to the Domesticate before or after scoring a victory over the Arabs at Germanikeia in 904, and was dismissed following the court intrigues of Samonas the eunuch. He fled to the Arabs, where he died in captivity c. 910.	
Gregoras Iberitzes	c. 907/8	Iberitzes appears in 906, when he was sent against the fortress held by Andronikos Doukas and his family; a relative of the Doukai, he took part in the attempted usurpation of Constantine Doukas in 913 and was tonsured and exiled.	
Constantine Doukas	c. 913	The son of Andronikos Doukas, he escaped from Arab captivity and was restored to high military office by Leo. In 913, as Domestic of the Schools, he attempted to usurp the throne from Leo's infant son Constantine VII, but failed and was killed.	
Appointed by Constantine VII (913–959)
Leo Phokas Magistros	unknown first tenure, c. 916 – 919	Leo served as Domestic for the first time sometime under Leo VI, and again, with the rank of magistros, during much of the regency of Empress Zoe. He led the Byzantine forces in the disastrous Battle of Acheloos in 917, but survived. He was dismissed from the Domesticate by Constantine VII at the urging of Patriarch Nicholas Mystikos and then outmanoeuvred in the struggle for control of the throne by Romanos Lekapenos. After launching an unsuccessful revolt, he was captured and blinded.	
John Garidas Magistros	919	An old officer in the Hetaireia, he replaced Leo Phokas in 919.	
Appointed by Romanos I Lekapenos (920–944)
Adralestos	c. 920/1	Adralestos was Domestic in the early years of Romanos I's reign, but died shortly after his appointment.	
Pothos Argyros	920/1–922	Pothos Argyros replaced Adralestos after the latter's death. He participated in the Battle of Pegae (922) but escaped. He was possibly dismissed as responsible the defeat.	
Leo Argyros Magistros	unknown, possibly 922	Younger brother of Pothos Argyros, he served as military commander already under Leo VI. It is known that he was magistros and held the post of Domestic, but not when. R. Guilland speculates that this was either in the early years of Romanos I's reign or after the latter's fall. Hans-Joachim Kühn considers that he followed his brother for a short period.	
John Kourkouas Magistros	922–944	One of the closest associates of Romanos I, Kourkouas held the Domesticate for 22 years and seven months. He led numerous campaigns against the Arabs which resulted in the conquest of Melitene and the recovery of the Mandylion from Edessa. He was dismissed after the sons of Romanos I toppled their father from power in December 944.	
Appointed by Stephen and Constantine Lekapenos (944–945)
Pantherios	944	Appointed in place of John Kourkouas by Romanos I's sons, his tenure was short-lived as Constantine VII overthrew them and assumed sole power.	
Appointed by Constantine VII (913–959)
Bardas Phokas Magistros	945–954	A distinguished general and brother of Leo Phokas, he was sidelined under Romanos I. He supported Constantine VII's coup against the Lekapenoi and was named magistros and Domestic in return. His military record was poor however, suffering several defeats at the hands of Sayf al-Dawla, and he was replaced by his son Nikephoros in 954. When Nikephoros came to the throne he made his father Caesar.	
Nikephoros Phokas Magistros	954–963	He succeeded his father in the Domesticate, and scored several successes against the Arabs: the sack of Adata in 957, the reconquest of Crete in 960–961 and victories against the Hamdanids in 962–963. In 963, following the death of Romanos II, he rose to the throne. He was murdered in 969 by John Tzimiskes.	
Appointed by Romanos II (959–963)
Leo Phokas Magistros	959–963	Younger brother of Nikephoros II, he occupied senior military posts under Constantine VII, while Romanos II named him as the first Domestic of the West. In 960–961 he replaced his brother in the East during the Cretan campaign, and defeated Sayf al-Dawla. When Nikephoros came to the throne he made him kouropalatēs a head minister. Following the murder of Nikephoros, he conspired repeatedly against Tzimiskes and was blinded and exiled.	
Appointed by Nikephoros II Phokas (963–969)
John Tzimiskes Magistros	963 – ?	Nephew and close aide to Nikephoros Phokas, he was promoted to Domestic of the East on the latter's accession, but was later dismissed. He murdered Nikephoros II in December 969 and reigned as emperor until his death in 976.	
Romanos Kourkouas Magistros	963 – c. 967	Son of John Kourkouas and related to Nikephoros Phokas, he was possibly promoted to Domestic of the West on the latter's accession.	
John Magistros	c. 967–971	Attested to by an inscription at Çorlu. Possibly to be identified with John Kourkouas, replacing his brother Romanos.	
Appointed by John I Tzimiskes (969–976)
Melias Magistros	c. 972–973	A relative of the celebrated early 10th-century stratēgos of the same name, he held the post of Domestic of the East. He led a campaign into Upper Mesopotamia in 972–973 and was captured during a siege of Amid.	
Appointed by Basil II (976–1025)
Bardas Phokas	978–987	The heir to the Phokas clan's imperial aspirations, he rebelled against Tzimiskes but was defeated by Bardas Skleros and imprisoned. He was released and given the Domesticate of the East in 978 to confront the rebellion of Skleros against Basil II. He defeated Skleros, but in 987 he rebelled against Basil himself, only to die in the middle of a battle against the emperor at Abydos in April 989.	
Stephen "Kontostephanos"	c. 986	Domestic of the West during the campaign against Bulgaria, and in part responsible for the heavy defeat in the Battle of the Gates of Trajan	
Nikephoros Ouranos Magistros	996–999	A confidante of Basil II and capable general, he was appointed "master of all the West" to confront the depredations of Tsar Samuel of Bulgaria, whom he decisively defeated at the Battle of Spercheios in 997. In 999 he was sent east as doux of Antioch, where he strengthened the Syrian frontier and scored successes against the Fatimids.	
Appointed by Constantine VIII (1025–1028)
Nicholas (I) Proedros	1025–1028	One of the eunuch favourites of Constantine VIII, he was named proedros, parakoimōmenos and Domestic of the Schools, although legally barred from the latter office.	
Appointed by Romanos III Argyros (1028–1034)
Symeon Proedros	1030 – ?	One of the eunuch favourites of Constantine VIII, he was named proedros and Drungary of the Watch by the emperor. He played a major role in the rise of Romanos III to the throne through his marriage to Zoe, and received the Domesticate of the East in 1030.	
Appointed by Michael IV the Paphlagonian (1034–1041)
Constantine (I)	1037–1041	A eunuch brother of Michael IV, he was named doux of Antioch c. 1034/35 and was raised to Domestic of the East in 1037. His leadership was not very successful, and in 1040 a failed conspiracy was directed against him. .	
Appointed by Michael V Kalaphates (1041–1042)
Constantine (II) Nobelissimos	1041–1042	After the death of Michael, Constantine was recalled and exiled by Empress Zoe. He was restored by his nephew Michael V and promoted to nōbelissimos, but was blinded and exiled again when the latter was deposed.	
Appointed by Zoe Porphyrogenita (1042)
Constantine Kabasilas	1042 – ?	One of the leaders of the revolt against Michael V, he was named "doux of the West" by Zoe.	
Nicholas (II)	1042–1044(?)	Dismissed by Romanos III, he was recalled to imperial favour and the Domesticate of the East by Zoe in 1042. In this capacity he led the defence against the Rus' raid of 1043 and campaigned without success in Armenia, whereupon he was relieved of his military command.	
Appointed by Constantine X Monomachos (1042–1055)
Constantine Arianites Magistros	c. 1048 – 1050	A distinguished general, he is recorded as holding the post of "master [of the troops] of the West" in the campaigns against the Pechenegs. He was killed before Adrianople in 1050.	
Appointed by Theodore Porphyrogenita (1055–1056)
Theodore Proedros	1054–1057	A eunuch and confidante of the empress, he was raised to the Domesticate of the East and the rank of proedros and sent east to fight the Turks. He marched against the rebellion of Isaac Komnenos and was defeated at the Battle of Petroe.	
Appointed by Isaac I Komnenos (1057–1059)
John Komnenos Kouropalates	1057 – ?	Younger brother of Isaac I, he was raised to kouropalatēs and "Grand Domestic" by his brother. The usage of "Grand Domestic" is probably an anachronistic usage by later sources, and his real title was probably Domestic of Schools of the West.	
Appointed by Romanos IV Diogenes (1068–1071)
Philaretos Brachamios (I) Kouropalates	c. 1068 – c. 1071	An Armenian nobleman, he was raised to Domestic of the East by Romanos IV, probably dismissed by Michael VII and reinstated by Nikephoros III.	
Appointed by Michael VII Doukas (1071–1078)
Andronikos Doukas	c. 1072	Eldest son of the Caesar John Doukas, prōtoproedros and prōtovestiarios, he was appointed Domestic of the East to confront the deposed emperor Romanos IV.	
Isaac Komnenos	c. 1073	Son of the kouropalatēs John Komnenos (brother of Isaac I), he was named Domestic and sent against the Turks, but was defeated and captured.	
Appointed by Nikephoros III Botaneiates (1078–1081)
Alexios Komnenos Sebastos	1078–1081	Nephew of Isaac I, he was appointed to the Domesticate of the West to combat the revolts of Nikephoros Bryennios and Nikephoros Basilakes. In 1081, he deposed Nikephoros III and became emperor, ruling until his death in 1118.	
Philaretos Brachamios (II) Protosebastos	1078 – c. 1084	An Armenian nobleman, he was raised to Domestic of the East by Romanos IV, probably dismissed by Michael VII and reinstated by Nikephoros III.	
Appointed by Alexios I Komnenos (1081–1118)
Gregory Pakourianos Sebastos	1081–1086	Was named "Grand Domestic of the West" after Alexios Komnenos ascended the throne, and was killed in battle in 1086. R. Guilland qualifies him as the "first person to be officially named "Grand Domestic"."	
Adrianos Komnenos Protosebastos	1086 – after 1095	A younger brother of Alexios I, he succeeded Pakourianos as "Grand Domestic of the West" in 1086.	
Bohemond of Taranto Sebastos	1097 – 1108	According to Anna Komnene, Bohemond demanded the office of "Grand Domestic of the East" during the First Crusade, but Alexios refused to grant it. Modern scholarship has argued that this request was granted along with a promise of territory around Edessa and Aleppo, modelled on Philaretos Brachamios' earlier tenure as Domestic. After the Treaty of Devol, Bohemond was demoted to the Doux of Antioch, but compensated with the title of Sebastos and control over Antioch itself.	
Appointed by Andronikos I Komnenos (1183–1185)
Alexios Gidos (I)	c. 1185	Known to have been "Grand Domestic of the East" in 1185.	
Appointed by Isaac II Angelos (1185–1195)
Alexios Gidos (II)	c. 1194	Domestic of the West in 1194 when he led the Byzantine army in the disastrous Battle of Arcadiopolis.	
Basil Vatatzes Sebastos	after 1185–c.1193	Married to a niece of Isaac II, as Domestic of the East and doux of the Thracesians he suppressed the revolt of Theodore Mankaphas in 1189.	
Basil Vatatzes (II) Sebastos	c. 1193–1194	By 1193 appointed Domestic of the West at Adrianople. He was killed in the Battle of Arcadiopolis in 1194.	
Appointed by John III Doukas Vatatzes (1221–1254)
Tzamplakon	unknown	Father of Alexios Tzamplakon and first notable member of his family, he is known to have held the title during the reign of John III (1222–1254).	
Theodotos Kalothetos Pansebastos sebastos	c. 1254/1258	He is known to have held the title from a letter addressed to him by Theodore II Laskaris (ruled 1254–1258). In 1259, he was governor of the Thracesian Theme.	
Appointed by Andronikos II Palaiologos (1282–1328)
Ferran d'Aunés	c. 1304	A Catalan mercenary, he was raised to the dignity of "Domestic of the Schools" and entered the Byzantine nobility, marrying into the Raoul family	
George Strategos Pansebastos sebastos	c. 1317	Domestic of the Schools of the West	
Manuel Doukas Laskaris	c. 1320	He is the last known holder of the title, mentioned in 1320 as "Domestic of the Schools of the West" and governor of Thessalonica	

The list above does not include holders known only through their seals but otherwise unidentified. For seals from the 8th–10th centuries, cf. Kühn 1991, pp. 81–83.

== Sources ==
- Bury, J. B.; Philotheus (1911). The Imperial Administrative System of the Ninth Century (With a Revised Text of the Kletorologion of Philotheos). London: Oxford University Press.
- Garland, Lynda (1999). Byzantine empresses: women and power in Byzantium, AD 527–1204. London and New York: Routledge. ISBN 978-0-415-14688-3.
- Guilland, Rodolphe (1967). "Le grand domestique". Recherches sur les institutions byzantines [Studies on the Byzantine Institutions]. Berliner byzantinische Arbeiten 35 (in French). Vol. I. Berlin and Amsterdam: Akademie-Verlag & Adolf M. Hakkert. pp. 405–425. OCLC 878894516.
- Guilland, Rodolphe (1967). "Le Domestique des Scholes". Recherches sur les institutions byzantines [Studies on the Byzantine Institutions]. Berliner byzantinische Arbeiten 35 (in French). Vol. I. Berlin and Amsterdam: Akademie-Verlag & Adolf M. Hakkert. pp. 426–468. OCLC 878894516.
- Haldon, John F. (1984). Byzantine Praetorians. An Administrative, Institutional and Social Survey of the Opsikion and Tagmata, c. 580–900. Bonn: Dr. Rudolf Habelt GmbH. ISBN 3-7749-2004-4.
- Kazhdan, Alexander, ed. (1991). The Oxford Dictionary of Byzantium. Oxford and New York: Oxford University Press. ISBN 0-19-504652-8.
- Kühn, Hans-Joachim (1991). Die byzantinische Armee im 10. und 11. Jahrhundert: Studien zur Organisation der Tagmata (in German). Vienna: Fassbaender Verlag. ISBN 3-9005-38-23-9.
- Lounghis, Tilemachos C. (1996). "The Decline of the Opsikian Domesticates and the Rise of the Domesticate of the Scholae". Byzantina Symmeikta. 10 (10). Athens: Institute for Byzantine Research: 27–36. doi:10.12681/byzsym.804. ISSN 1105-1639.
- Oikonomides, Nicolas (1972). Les listes de préséance byzantines des IXe et Xe siècles. Paris: Centre National de la Recherche Scientifique.
- Ringrose, Kathryn M. (2003). The Perfect Servant: Eunuchs and the Social Construction of Gender in Byzantium. Chicago: University of Chicago Press. ISBN 978-0-226-72015-9.
- Tougher, Shaun (1997). The Reign of Leo VI (886–912): Politics and People. Leiden and New York: BRILL. ISBN 978-90-04-10811-0.
- Verpeaux, Jean, ed. (1966). Pseudo-Kodinos, Traité des Offices (in French). Paris: Centre National de la Recherche Scientifique.
