= Leo Phokas the Elder =

Early 10th century Byzantine general

Leo Phokas
- Relatives: Nikephoros Phokas the Elder (father), Bardas Phokas the Elder (brother)
- Military career
- Allegiance: Byzantine Empire
- Service years: c. 900–919
- Rank: Domestic of the Schools
- Wars: Arab–Byzantine wars in the East and Byzantine–Bulgarian wars

Leo Phokas (Greek: Λέων Φωκᾶς, fl. 910s) was an early 10th-century Byzantine general of the noble Phokas clan. As Domestic of the Schools, the Byzantine army's commander-in-chief, he led a large-scale campaign against the Bulgarians in 917, but was heavily defeated at the battles of Acheloos and Katasyrtai. He then plotted to seize the throne from the young Byzantine emperor Constantine VII (r. 913–959), but was outmaneuvered by the admiral Romanos Lekapenos, who managed to become guardian and later father-in-law of the Emperor. After Lekapenos seized control of the Byzantine Empire, Leo led an unsuccessful revolt, and was captured and blinded.

== Biography ==
Leo was the son of Nikephoros Phokas the Elder, an eminent Byzantine general who had distinguished himself in southern Italy. His brother, Bardas, was also a senior general, as were Bardas's sons Nikephoros and Leo. Nikephoros eventually became Emperor in 963–969. Little is known about Leo's early life. During the late reign of Emperor Leo VI the Wise (r. 886–912), he married the sister of Constantine Barbaros, the Emperor's powerful parakoimomenos, and rose to the post of Domestic of the Schools. Although personally brave and not without some measure of success against the Arabs in the East, his ability as a general was rather limited. Steven Runciman attributed his rise more to his aristocratic origin and his familial connection with the parakoimomenos Constantine.

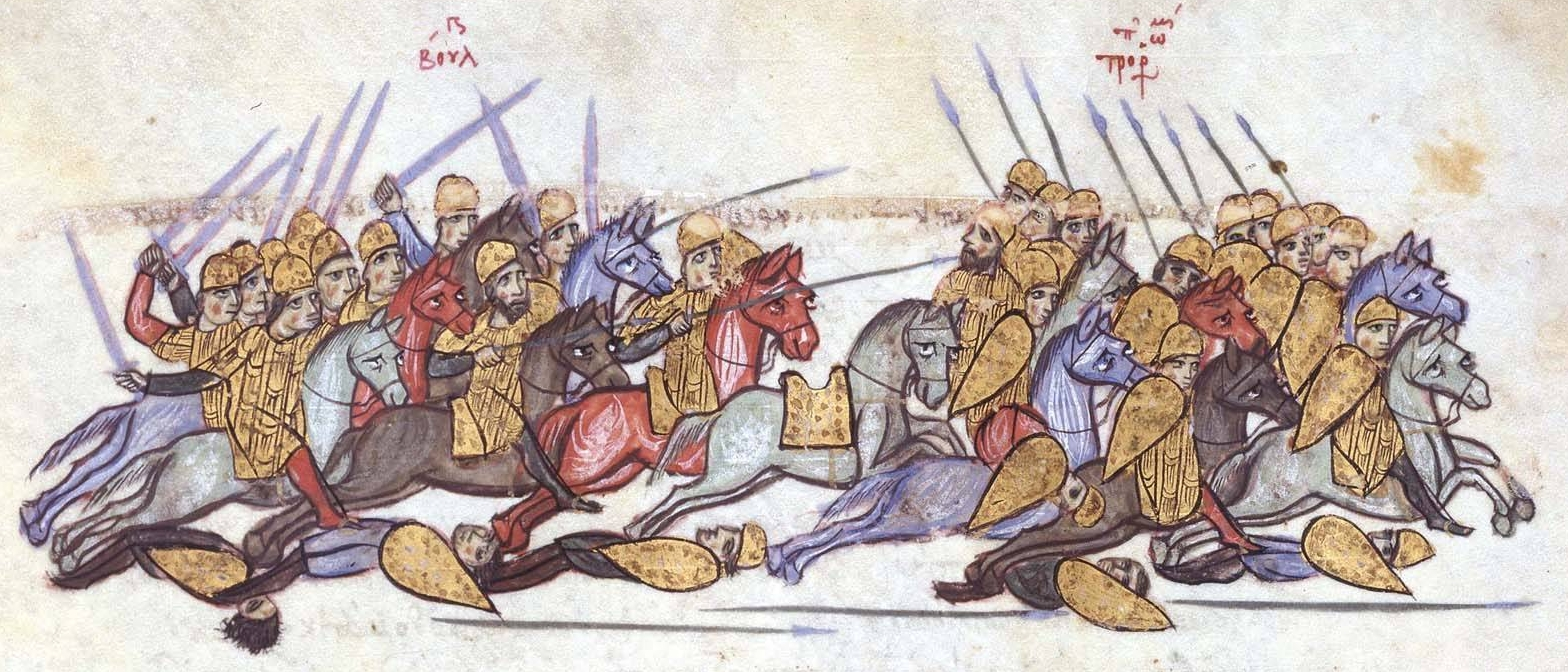
The Byzantine rout at Acheloos, from the Madrid Skylitzes.

During the regency of Empress Zoe in 913–919, Leo is recorded as being again Domestic of the Schools and holding the dignity of magistros. In 917, he was placed in charge of a large-scale expedition against the Bulgarians. The plan involved a two-pronged assault, one from the south by the main Byzantine army under Leo Phokas, and one from the north by the Pechenegs, who were to be ferried across the Danube by the Byzantine navy under Romanos Lekapenos. In the event, however, the Pechenegs did not help the Byzantines, partly because Lekapenos quarrelled with their leader (or, as Runciman suggests, might have even been bribed by the Bulgarians) and partly because they had already begun plundering on their own, disregarding the Byzantine plan. Left unsupported by both the Pechenegs and the fleet, Phokas suffered a crushing defeat at the hands of Tsar Symeon at the Battle of Acheloos. The imperial army was almost annihilated, and Phokas himself barely escaped. As Symeon marched south towards the imperial capital, Constantinople, Phokas gathered a motley force and attempted to halt his advance, but was again defeated by Symeon in a surprise night attack at Katasyrtai.

These military disasters weakened the regency of Zoe, and rumours began to circulate that Phokas, whose army lay encamped across the Bosporus from Constantinople, and his brother-in-law Constantine Barbaros were planning to seize the throne from the young emperor Constantine VII (r. 913–959). According to Runciman, Zoe herself possibly planned to solidify her own position by marrying the general. The Emperor's tutor, however, a certain Theodore, turned to Romanos Lekapenos; although the admiral carried a great share of the blame for the failure of the Bulgarian campaign, Romanos remained a powerful factor as his fleet was intact and ready at hand. The parakoimomenos Constantine tried to neutralize this threat by disbanding the fleet, but he was arrested by Lekapenos when he arrived to supervise the payment and discharge of the crews. With this stroke, Zoe lost all control of the situation, and at Theodore's urging, the young Emperor appointed the Patriarch Nicholas Mystikos as regent. The Patriarch's first act was to dismiss Leo Phokas from his post as Domestic and replace him with John Garidas.

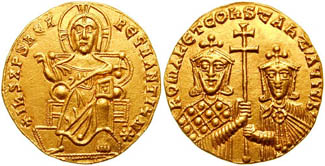
Gold solidus of Emperor Constantine VII (r. 913–959) with Romanos Lekapenos. After overcoming the rebellion of Leo Phokas, Lekapenos promoted himself to Caesar and was eventually crowned as senior emperor (basileus autokrator) in December 920, ruling until his abdication in December 944.

Leo apparently believed that Lekapenos, in view of his lowly origins, could never possibly put forward a credible claim for the imperial throne. Events proved that he had severely miscalculated: on March 25, 919, Lekapenos managed to gain entrance to the imperial palace, occupied it and secured his appointment as magistros and commander of the Hetaireia. A few weeks later, he married his daughter Helena to the young Emperor and assumed the title of basileopator, becoming the virtual ruler of the Byzantine Empire.

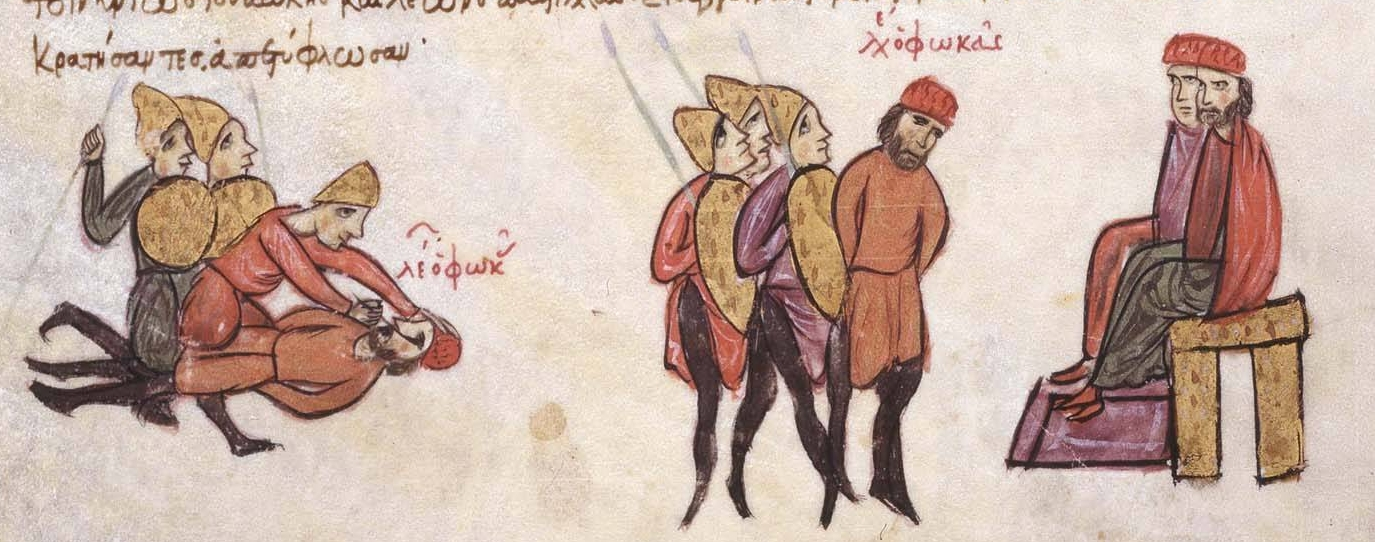
The capture and blinding of Leo Phokas.

Leo Phokas was then sent a letter, in the Emperor's name, in which he was bidden not to react to these events. Inevitably, the outmaneuvered Leo rose in revolt, but failed to secure the loyalty of his troops: they began to desert to the imperial camp, especially after a letter from the young Constantine VII, which acclaimed Lekapenos as his protector and denounced Leo's rebellion, reached the rebel camp and was read aloud to them. Eventually, Leo was forced to flee, but was captured and blinded by the Emperor's agents in Bithynia. Following the discovery of a plot by some of his friends a few months later, Phokas suffered a final humiliation, being paraded through the streets of Constantinople on a mule. His fate thereafter is unknown.

== Sources ==
- Guilland, Rodolphe (1967). Recherches sur les institutions byzantines (2 vols.) [Studies on the Byzantine Institutions]. Berliner byzantinische Arbeiten 35 (in French). Berlin and Amsterdam: Akademie-Verlag & Adolf M. Hakkert. OCLC 878894516.
- Kazhdan, Alexander, ed. (1991). The Oxford Dictionary of Byzantium. Oxford and New York: Oxford University Press. ISBN 0-19-504652-8.
- Runciman, Steven (1988) [1929]. The Emperor Romanus Lecapenus and His Reign: A Study of Tenth-Century Byzantium. Cambridge: Cambridge University Press. ISBN 0-521-35722-5.
- Treadgold, Warren (1997). A History of the Byzantine State and Society. Stanford, California: Stanford University Press. ISBN 0-8047-2630-2.

Preceded by Constantine Doukas	Domestic of the Schools; 913–919	Succeeded by John Garidas
