= Constantine Doukas (usurper) =

Byzantine general (died 913)

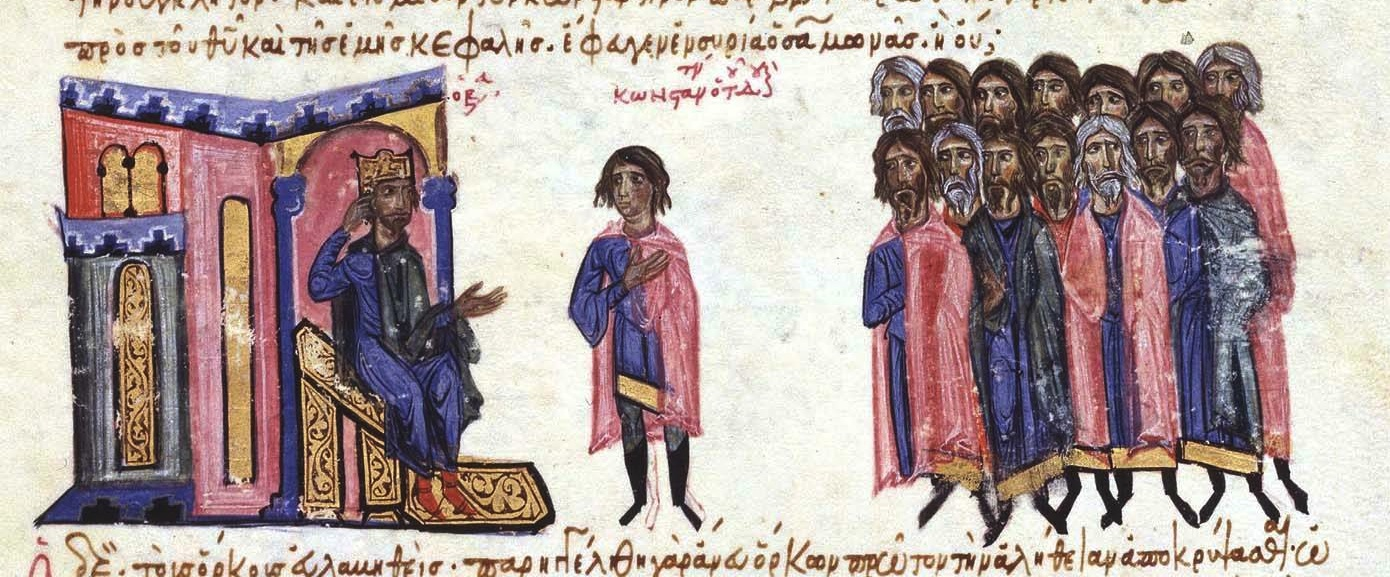
- Emperor Leo calls Constantine Doukas (middle) as a witness, from the Madrid Skylitzes.
- Died: 9 June 913; Constantinople (modern-day Istanbul, Turkey)
- Relatives: Andronikos Doukas (father)
- Military career
- Allegiance: Byzantine Empire
- Rank: Domestic of the Schools

Constantine Doukas (or Doux) (Greek: Κωνσταντίνος Δούκας/Δούξ; died 913) was a prominent Byzantine general. In 904, he stopped the influential eunuch court official Samonas from defecting to the Arabs. In return, Samonas manipulated his father, Andronikos Doukas, into rebelling and fleeing to the Abbasid court in 906/7. Constantine followed his father to Baghdad, but soon escaped and returned to Byzantium, where he was restored by Leo VI the Wise to favour and entrusted with high military offices. Upon the death of the Emperor Alexander, Constantine with the support of several aristocrats unsuccessfully tried to usurp the throne from the young Constantine VII, but was killed in a clash with supporters of the legitimate emperor.

== Life ==
=== Early life and career ===
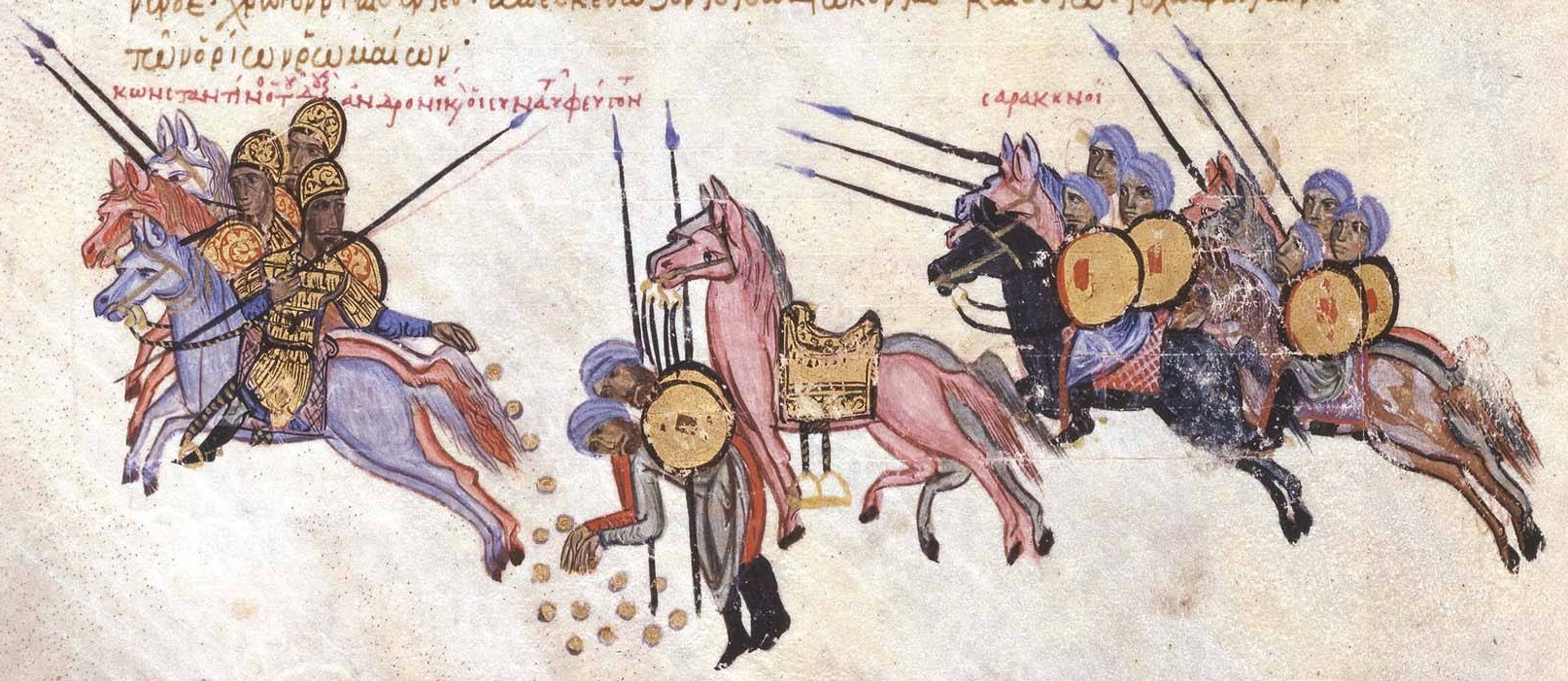
Constantine Doukas escapes from Arab captivity, throwing gold coins behind him to delay his pursuers. Miniature from the Madrid Skylitzes chronicle

Constantine Doukas was the son of Andronikos Doukas, a prominent general under Emperor Leo VI the Wise (r. 886–912) and the first prominent member of the Doukas family. Constantine first appears in the sources in 904, during the attempted flight of the Arab-born eunuch Samonas, one of the emperor's most trusted aides, to Syria. Constantine captured Samonas at the Monastery of the Holy Cross at Siricha, near the river Halys, and escorted him back to Constantinople, where an enquiry into the matter was held before the Senate. Leo, who was still attached to his servant, enjoined Constantine to maintain that Samonas had in fact been making a pilgrimage to the shrine of Siricha, and not the Arab frontier. When the senators however asked Constantine to verify the truth of this claim by swearing on "God and the emperor's head", he refused to hide the truth. Samonas was punished by house arrest, and although he was pardoned by Leo after only four months and restored to his offices, he had conceived a deep enmity towards the Doukai.

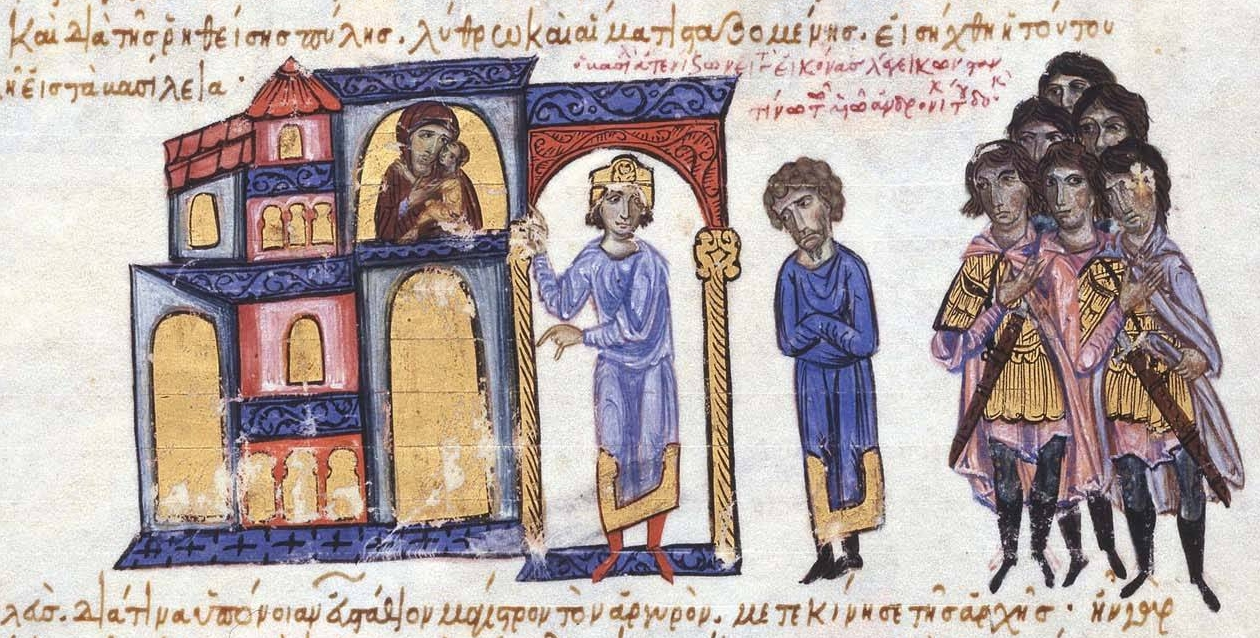
Miniature from the Madrid Skylitzes, showing Leo admonishing Constantine not to attempt to usurp the throne

This grudge came to the fore in 906, when Samonas tricked Andronikos into refusing to participate in an imperial expedition. Afraid that he would be punished for his disobedience, Andronikos with his family and retainers fled to the fortress of Kabala, near Iconium, and thence across the border into exile in the Abbasid Caliphate. Constantine and his father ended up in Baghdad, the Abbasid capital. Leo sent a secret message to the Doukai, offering a full pardon if they returned, but again through the machinations of Samonas, the letter fell into the hands of Caliph al-Muktafi (r. 902–908), who had Andronikos confined to house arrest and forced to convert to Islam along with those who had followed him. He died there in ca. 910. Constantine however managed to escape Baghdad, and was warmly welcomed back by Leo in a ceremony in the throne room of the Chrysotriklinos. The date of his return to Byzantium is unclear, but must be placed between ca. 908 and ca. 911. Despite his father's revolt, the Doukai remained very popular due to their military successes, and prophecies apparently circulated that predicted Constantine's rise to the throne. As a result, according to Theophanes Continuatus, Leo warned the young man from trying to become emperor, but this is probably a later interpolation in view of Constantine Doukas' eventual fate. In reality, Leo seems to have trusted him, for he showered him with gifts and appointed him to senior military positions: initially he was named—apparently in succession to Eustathios Argyros —strategos of the Charsianon theme, but by 913 he had risen to the post of Domestic of the Schools (commander-in-chief of the army). From both positions he fought victoriously against the Arabs.

=== Attempted usurpation ===
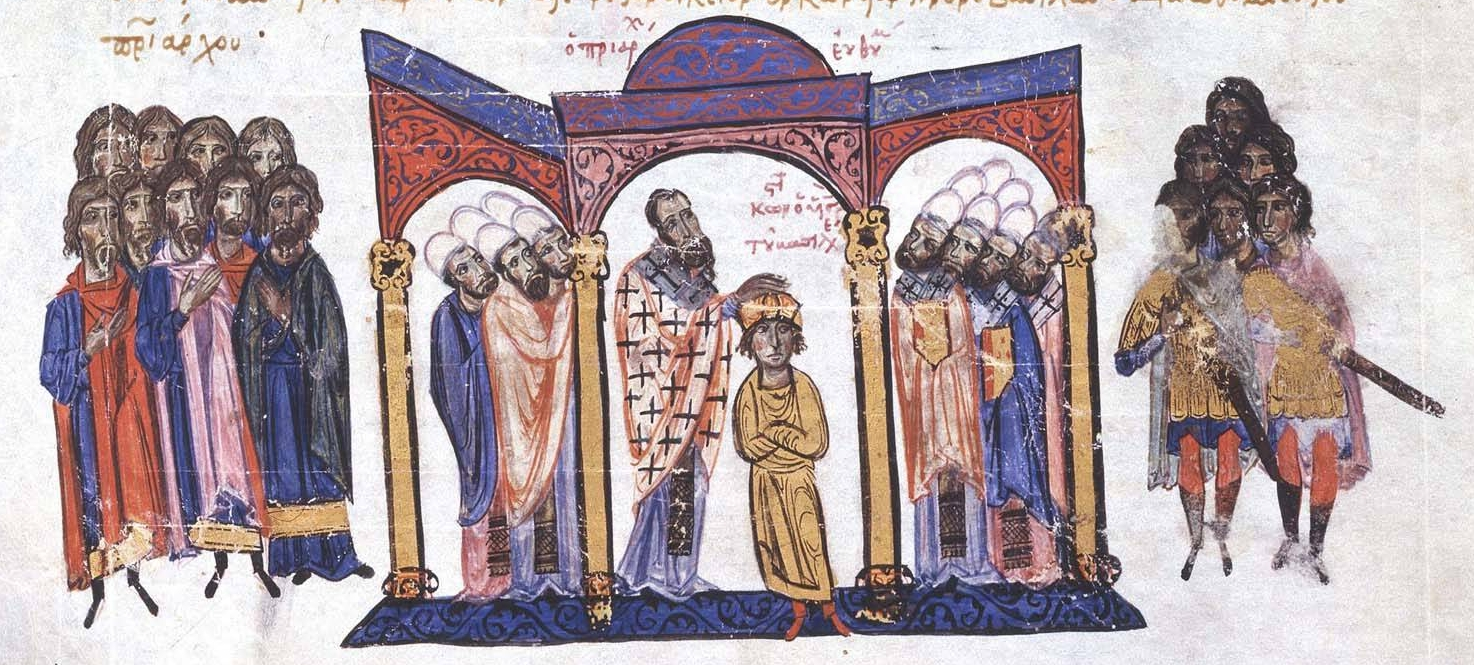
The coronation of the young Constantine VII. Miniature from the Madrid Skylitzes chronicle

Leo VI died in May 912 and was succeeded by his brother Alexander (r. 912–913), who reigned for little over a year before dying in June 913. Leo's empress, Zoe Karbonopsina, and his son and titular co-emperor, Constantine VII (r. 913–959), were sidelined during the reign of Alexander, who also restored Zoe's old adversary, Nicholas Mystikos, as Patriarch of Constantinople. Thus, at the death of Alexander (6 June 913), with Constantine VII not even eight years old, a power struggle ensued between Zoe and Patriarch Nicholas, who headed the regency council. It was at this point that Constantine Doukas launched a rebellion aiming for the throne. The Life of Euthymius hagiography, a source hostile to Patriarch Nicholas, reports that the Patriarch was also involved, although the other Byzantine sources include this as a widespread rumour rather than a fact. According to these sources, unaware that he would be appointed regent (Alexander named him to the regency council on his deathbed), fearful of losing his pre-eminent position, and anxious about the military threat posed by the Bulgarian Tsar Simeon, which required a more experienced hand at the helm of the state, the Patriarch summoned Doukas to assume the throne.

Doukas, enjoying wide support among both the aristocrats and the populace, accepted the summons and headed to Constantinople with a few trusted friends. Barely three days after Alexander's death, he entered the capital in secret during the night through a postern on the sea walls, and hid in the house of his father-in-law, Gregoras Iberitzes, where he was soon joined by high-ranking courtiers such as the patrikios Constantine Helladikos. Already before dawn on the following morning, Constantine and his supporters, bearing torches, marched to the Hippodrome, joined along the way by a great multitude of people. Constantine was duly proclaimed emperor before the people at the Hippodrome, and headed in triumph towards the Chalke Gate of the imperial palace. After crossing the iron gate of the Chalke, however, at the hall of the Exkoubitoi, he was opposed by the soldiers of the Hetaireia guard and armed oarsmen of the imperial fleet, assembled by the magistros John Eladas, a member of the regency council. A clash followed, in which many were killed, including Constantine's son Gregory, his nephew Michael and his friend Kourtikes. Disheartened, Constantine turned and tried to flee, but his horse slipped and fell. Constantine was killed by an arrow; according to the Life of Euthymius cursing the Patriarch Nicholas as he died. His head was cut off and presented to Constantine VII.

The Life of Basil the Younger on the other hand reports a slightly different version, according to which the summons to Doukas were undertaken by the entire regency council, which proposed to Doukas to assume the governance of the state while Constantine VII would be limited to his ceremonial duties. According to this source, the proposal met with refusal from Doukas, and the regents had to send a second letter with their own enkolpia to persuade him otherwise. By the time he entered Constantinople, however, the regents had changed their minds and barricaded the palace against him. After his proclamation at the Hippodrome, Doukas resolved to besiege the palace, but finally tried to enter through the Chalke, while ordering his followers not to draw their swords so as to avoid bloodshed. There he was ambushed by archers placed by the regents, and killed along with a number of his followers.

Numerous supporters of the usurper—800 according to the Life of Euthymius, over 3,000 according to the Life of Basil the Younger—were harshly punished; some were blinded and exiled, while others—including those who had sought sanctuary in the Hagia Sophia—were tonsured and confined to monasteries, while many of the common folk were affixed to stakes on the eastern shore of the Bosporus.

Constantine Doukas' wife was shorn and exiled to her husband's estate in Paphlagonia and his younger son Stephen was castrated. Along with the deaths of Constantine's son and nephew, this meant the extinction of this branch of the Doukas family: the relation of the later bearers of the Doukas name with Andronikos and Constantine is unclear.

== Legacy ==
Despite his failure at seizing the throne, Constantine Doukas' popularity meant that his memory was preserved both among the people and the aristocracy of Asia Minor: in the 930s, Basil the Copper Hand assumed his identity and led a peasant revolt, while among the aristocracy he was glorified as a hero. Elements of Constantine's life eventually found their way into the epic poem Digenes Akrites.

== Sources ==
- Garland, Lynda (1999). Byzantine Empresses: Women and Power in Byzantium, AD 527–1204. Routledge. ISBN 0-415-14688-7.
- Kazhdan, Alexander, ed. (1991). The Oxford Dictionary of Byzantium. Oxford and New York: Oxford University Press. ISBN 0-19-504652-8.
- Krsmanovic, Bojana (2003). "Doukas family". Encyclopedia of the Hellenic World – Asia Minor. Archived from the original on 21 July 2011.
- Lilie, Ralph-Johannes; Ludwig, Claudia; Pratsch, Thomas; Zielke, Beate (2013). Prosopographie der mittelbyzantinischen Zeit Online. Berlin-Brandenburgische Akademie der Wissenschaften. Nach Vorarbeiten F. Winkelmanns erstellt (in German). Berlin and Boston: De Gruyter.
- Polemis, Demetrios I. (1968). The Doukai: A Contribution to Byzantine Prosopography. London: The Athlone Press.
- Runciman, Steven (1988) [1929]. The Emperor Romanus Lecapenus and His Reign: A Study of Tenth-Century Byzantium. Cambridge, United Kingdom: Cambridge University Press. ISBN 0-521-35722-5.
- Tougher, Shaun (1997). The Reign of Leo VI (886–912): Politics and People. BRILL. ISBN 90-04-09777-5.

Unknown Title last held by Gregoras Iberitzes	Domestic of the Schools ?–913	Succeeded by Leo Phokas the Elder
