= Adralestos =

10th century commander-in-chief of the Byzantine Army

- Ἀδράλεστος

Domestic of the Schools
- In office 920–921
- Preceded by: John Garidas
- Succeeded by: Pothos Argyros

Adralestos (Greek: Ἀδράλεστος) was the Domestic of the Schools (commander-in-chief of the Byzantine army) in the early years of the reign of Romanos I Lekapenos, with whom he was related by birth.

Very little is known about him. He was apparently appointed to the post of Domestic after Romanos I's rise to the throne in 920, in succession to John Garidas, and held the post until his death later in 920 or in 921, as he is already mentioned as having died in 921. His successor was Pothos Argyros. His family is unknown. Rodolphe Guilland considered him an ancestor, likely grandfather, of Adralestos Diogenes, strategos of the Anatolic Theme in 970, but there is little concrete evidence to support this assumption other than the identical names.

== Sources ==
- Kazhdan, Alexander; Cutler, Antony (1991). "Maleinos". In Kazhdan, Alexander (ed.). The Oxford Dictionary of Byzantium. Oxford and New York: Oxford University Press. p. 1276. ISBN 0-19-504652-8.
- Krsmanović, Bojana (September 11, 2003). "Maleinos Family". Encyclopaedia of the Hellenic World: Asia Minor. Athens: Foundation of the Hellenic World. Archived from the original on 27 February 2012.
- Guilland, Rodolphe (1967). "Le Domestique des Scholes". Recherches sur les institutions byzantines [Studies on the Byzantine Institutions]. Berliner byzantinische Arbeiten 35 (in French). Vol. I. Berlin and Amsterdam: Akademie-Verlag & Adolf M. Hakkert. pp. 426–468. OCLC 878894516.
- Lilie, Ralph-Johannes; Ludwig, Claudia; Pratsch, Thomas; Zielke, Beate (2013). Prosopographie der mittelbyzantinischen Zeit Online. Berlin-Brandenburgische Akademie der Wissenschaften. Nach Vorarbeiten F. Winkelmanns erstellt (in German). Berlin and Boston: De Gruyter.

Preceded by John Garidas	Domestic of the Schools ca. 920/1	Succeeded by Pothos Argyros
