= Phokas (Byzantine family) =

Byzantine noble family

Phokas (Ancient Greek: Φωκᾶς, romanized: Phōkâs) or Phocas (Latinized), feminine form Phokaina or Phocaena (Φώκαινα, Phṓkaina), was the name of a Byzantine aristocratic clan from Cappadocia, which in the 9th and 10th centuries provided a series of high-ranking generals and an emperor, Nikephoros II Phokas (r. 963–969). Its members and their clients monopolized the high-command positions of the Byzantine army for much of the 10th century and led the successful Byzantine offensive against the Arabs in the East. As one of the leading families of the Anatolian military aristocracy, the Phokades were also involved in a series of rebellions that laid claim to power and challenged the emperors at Constantinople. Their power was eventually broken by Basil II (r. 976–1025), and the family declined in importance after the 11th century.

== History ==
=== Origin and early members ===
The Byzantine official and historian Michael Attaleiates, writing in the second half of the 11th century, claimed to have come across the genealogical tree of the family in an old book, and presented its descent from Constantine the Great, and even further back from the ancient Roman families of Fabia and Scipiones; according to Byzantinists Ivan Đurić, Athanasios Markopoulos, and Nathan Leidholm, this narrative was very likely made-up with the purpose of glorifying the recently crowned Emperor Nikephoros III Botaneiates, who claimed descent from the Phokades. The Arab historian Ibn al-Athir, writing in the first half of the 13th century, presented Nikephoros II Phokas as the son of a Muslim from Tarsos, named Ibn al-Fuqas; this is rejected by modern historians. Đurić, in particular, wrote that this story could be based on a local folktale, and that al-Athir, who was from a different time and place, was ignorant of the emperor's ancestors who were attested in Byzantine sources; such as his actual father, Bardas Phokas the Elder, who was neither a Muslim nor from Tarsos. The historian Jean-Claude Cheynet has speculated an Armenian or Georgian origin for the family (partly to account for the frequent presence of the name "Bardas" among the family members), while various other scholars speculate a mixed Greek—or at least "deeply hellenized," according to Peter Charanis—and Armenian origin. None of these hypotheses can be conclusively proven today. Whatever their ethnic origins, the Phokades appear to have settled in Cappadocia, where their estates were concentrated and which is clearly attested as their power base and the center of their activities.

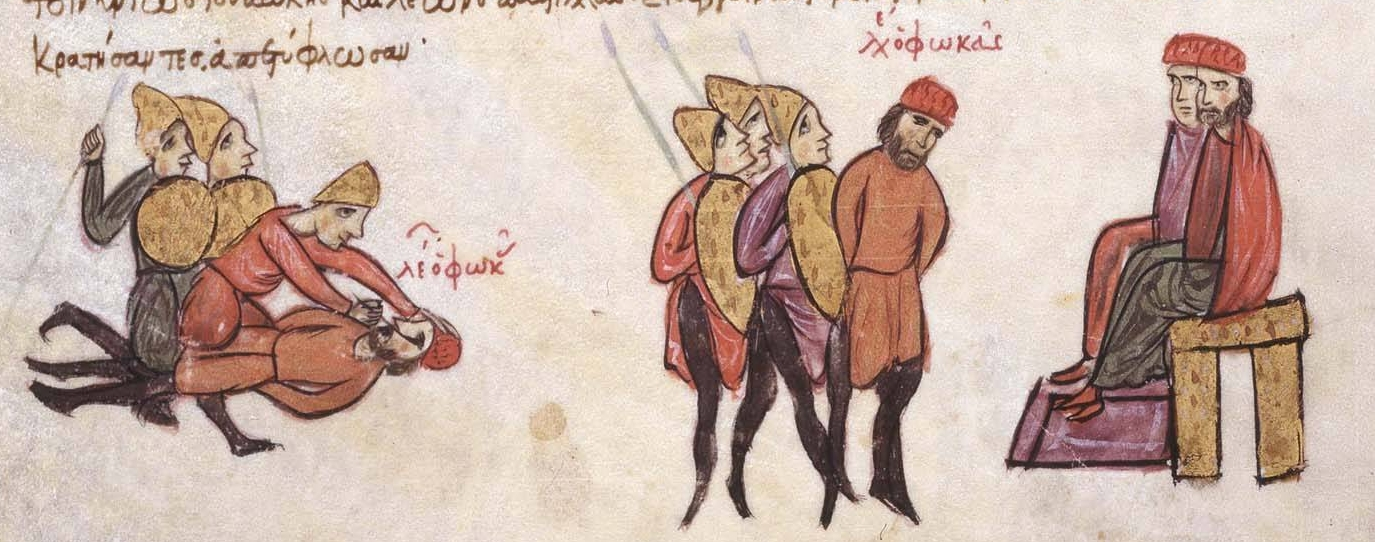
The blinding of Leo Phokas

The personal name Phokas appears as early as the 5th–6th centuries CE; and there is also Emperor Phokas (r. 602–610), but there is no evidence connecting these early Phokades to the family. The first-attested member of the family was a soldier, probably of humble origin, who was appointed tourmarches (divisional commander) in 872. His son, Nikephoros Phokas the Elder, became a distinguished general, scoring several victories against the Arabs, especially in southern Italy, and reaching the position of Domestic of the Schools. His son, Leo Phokas the Elder, was also Domestic of the Schools, but was defeated by the Bulgarian tsar Symeon (r. 893–927), and later unsuccessfully opposed the rise of Romanos Lekapenos to the throne in 919, being captured and blinded. His brother, Bardas Phokas the Elder, already active as a general, fell in disgrace for a time, but by the time of Lekapenos's fall in 944, he was a patrikios and a high-ranking general.

=== Apex of power and fall ===
After the fall of the Lekapenoi clan, Constantine VII appointed Bardas as Domestic of the Schools, while his sons Nikephoros, Leo and Constantine were placed as strategoi (generals and military governors) of the themes of Anatolikon, Cappadocia and Seleukeia, respectively. These appointments heralded a period of over twenty years when the Phokades and their clients monopolized the Byzantine army's leadership. During this period, the Phokas clan was closely allied with the Maleinoi, a rich and powerful family from Charsianon, through the marriage of Bardas to a Maleinos lady. Other families that were closely aligned with and often related to them through marriage were the Adralestoi, Skleroi, Kourkouai, Parsakoutenoi, Balantai and Botaneiatai.

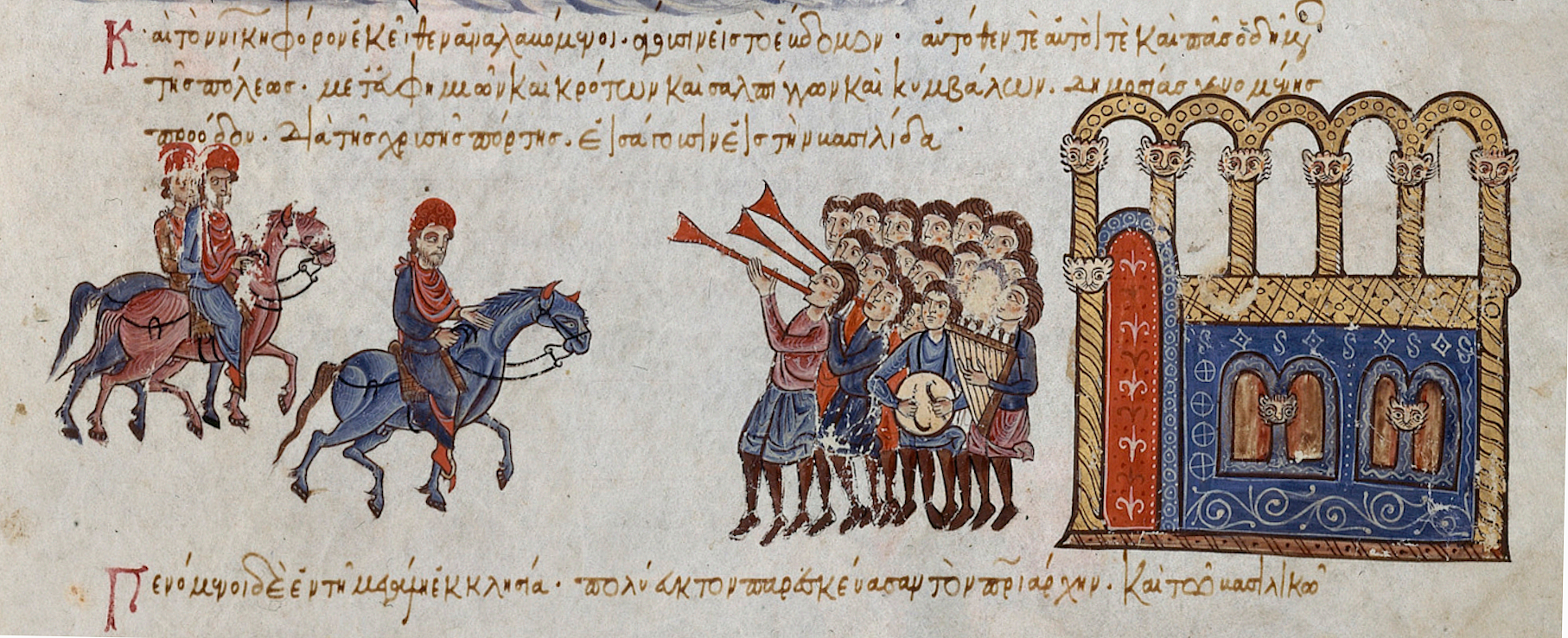
Entry of Nikephoros Phokas (r. 963–969) into Constantinople as emperor, from the Madrid Skylitzes

Bardas himself, already in his mid-sixties when named commander-in-chief, proved a mediocre general, suffering a string of defeats at the hands of the Hamdanid emir Sayf al-Dawla. One of them, in 953, even left his son Constantine captive in the Hamdanid's hands. Finally, in 955, Bardas was replaced by his son Nikephoros. With the aid of Leo, who had already established himself through victories of his own, and his nephew John Tzimiskes, Nikephoros achieved a series of successes, recovering Crete and Cyprus and repeatedly defeating Sayf al-Dawla's forces. With the sudden death of Romanos II in 963, the popular and powerful Nikephoros seized the throne, becoming senior emperor and guardian over the young sons of Romanos, Basil II and Constantine VIII. His father Bardas was named Caesar, and his brother Leo received the high court rank of kouropalates and the office of logothetes tou dromou (postal minister). As emperor, Nikephoros continued his campaigns in the East, conquering Cilicia and northwestern Syria.

Nikephoros's regime, however, quickly became unpopular, both due to his focus on military affairs to the detriment of the economy and for his religious policies. In December 969, he was murdered by a group of disaffected generals led by his nephew and one-time protégé John Tzimiskes, with the connivance of Empress Theophano. The Phokades were dismissed from their posts and titles and exiled by the new regime. Bardas Phokas the Younger, the younger son of the kouropalates Leo and former doux (military commander) of Chaldia, escaped and rose up in revolt in 970, but was defeated, tonsured and exiled to Chios, while in 971 Leo and his eldest son the patrikios Nikephoros were blinded and their property confiscated. One member of the family had a different fate: Leo's daughter Sophia Phokaina had married Constantine Skleros, the brother of Bardas Skleros. Constantine was Tzimiskes's brother-in-law from his first marriage and a close ally of the new emperor. Their daughter, Theophano, was married in 972 to the Holy Roman Emperor Otto II (r. 973–983).

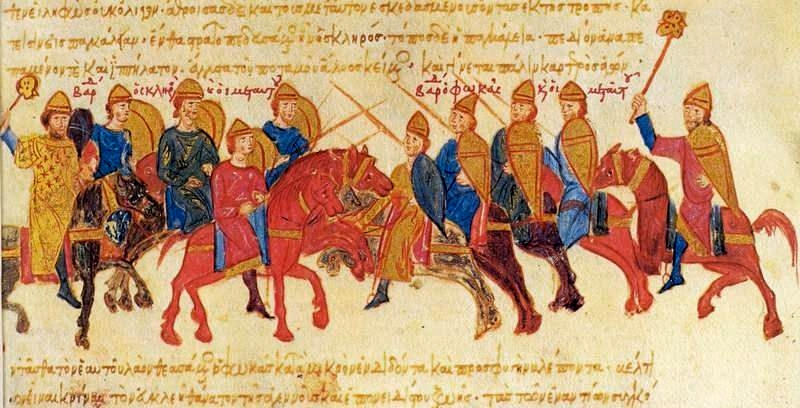
Battle between the armies of Bardas Skleros and Bardas Phokas, from the Madrid Skylitzes

In 978, Bardas was recalled by Basil II to lead the imperial forces against the rebellion of Bardas Skleros. Named magistros and Domestic of the East, he managed to defeat Skleros. Bardas himself rebelled in 987, with the support of many of the major aristocratic families, in an uprising that lasted until his death in 989 at the Battle of Abydos. Skleros, who had returned from his Arab exile and had been captured by Bardas Phokas, tried to assume the leadership of the revolt, allying himself with Bardas's sons Leo and Nikephoros, but soon submitted to the emperor. Leo tried to hold out in Antioch but was surrendered to the emperor by the city's inhabitants.

=== Later members of the family ===
After facing down the rebellions of the large aristocratic families, Basil II undertook a series of measures to curb their power, wealth and influence. The Phokades in particular were kept away from military posts and suffered the confiscation of their extensive estates. Basil's edict of 996, directed against the often illegal accumulation of vast estates by the Anatolian magnates, specifically names the Phokades and the closely allied Maleinoi as targets of the emperor's legislation. The Phokades, however, retained a measure of influence in their native Cappadocia: there, in 1022, Bardas Phokas's son Nikephoros, surnamed Barytrachelos (Βαρυτράχηλος, "wry-neck"), in alliance with Nikephoros Xiphias, was proclaimed emperor. He was soon murdered by Xiphias and the Phokas supporters deserted the revolt, which quickly broke apart. The last mention of a direct descendant of the Phokas family comes in 1026, when the patrikios Bardas, the grandson of the magistros Bardas, was accused of plotting against Emperor Constantine VIII (r. 1025–1028) and blinded.

These events signalled the end of the direct line of the great 10th-century generals, which almost certainly died out by the mid-11th century. Nevertheless, the prestige attached to the family name remained considerable for a time after their end: the historian Michael Attaleiates praised Nikephoros III Botaneiates (r. 1078–1081) for being related to the Phokades, "whose glory stretches over all the land and the sea". The Phokas name is rarely mentioned thereafter, until it experienced a revival during the 13th century in the Empire of Nicaea: Theodotos Phokas, the uncle of Theodore I Laskaris (r. 1205–1222), became megas doux (commander-in-chief of the navy), a certain Michael Phokas was stratopedarches (military commander) in 1234, and another family member was metropolitan bishop of Philadelphia.

== Family tree, 9th–11th centuries ==
Family tree, 9th–11th centuries

Phokas (fl. 860s–870s), tourmarches
Nikephoros Phokas the Elder (died 896), Domestic of the Schools
Sister of Constantine Barbaros	Leo Phokas the Elder (fl. 910s), Domestic of the Schools, rebel	Bardas Phokas the Elder (died 969), Domestic of the Schools, Caesar	NN. Maleine
Theophano, Empress-consort in 959–969	Nikephoros II Phokas (912–969), Domestic of the Schools, emperor in 963–969	NN. Pleustaina	Leo Phokas the Younger, Domestic of the Schools, kouropalates and Postal Logothete	Constantine Phokas (died 959), strategos of Seleukeia	NN. Phokaina	NN. Kourkouas	NN. Phokaina	Theodoulos Parsakoutenos
Nikephoros Phokas, patrikios	Bardas Phokas the Younger (died 989), Domestic of the Schools, rebel	Sophia Phokaina	Constantine Skleros	John I Tzimiskes (ca. 925–976), Domestic of the Schools, emperor in 969–976
Leo Phokas, doux of Antioch	Nikephoros Phokas Barytrachelos (d. 1022), patrikios and rebel	Theophanu	Otto II (955–983), Holy Roman Emperor in 973–983
Bardas Phokas, patrikios

== See also ==
- History of the Byzantine Empire
- Byzantine Empire under the Macedonian dynasty
- John Phocas
- Juan de Fuca
- Jean Focas
