= Abu Firas al-Hamdani =

Hamdanid dynasty prince and poet (932–968)

- أبو فراس الحمداني
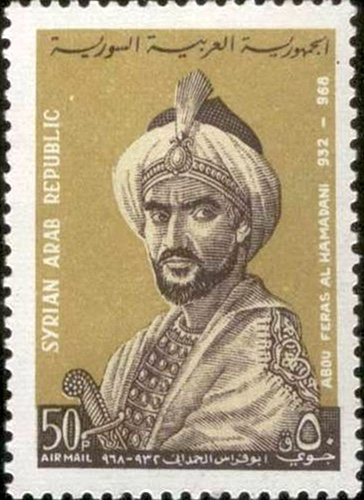
- 1963 Syrian postage stamp with a modern representation of Abu Firas
- Born: Al-Harith ibn Abi'l-Ala Sai'd; 932/933 probably Baghdad
- Died: 4 April 968 (age 35-36); Sadad (near Homs)
- Occupations: Governor, military leader and poet
- Years active: 948–968
- Notable work: al-Rūmiyyāt

Al-Harith ibn Abi’l-ʿAlaʾ Saʿid ibn Hamdan al-Taghlibi (932–968), better known by his pen name Abu Firas al-Hamdani (Arabic: أبو فراس الحمداني), was an Arab prince and poet. He was a cousin of Sayf al-Dawla and a member of the Hamdanid dynasty, who were rulers in northern Syria and Upper Mesopotamia during the 10th century. He served Sayf al-Dawla as governor of Manbij as well as court poet, and was active in his cousin's wars against the Byzantine Empire. He was captured by the Byzantines in 959/962 and spent several years at their capital, Constantinople, where he composed his most famous work, the collection of poems titled al-Rūmiyyāt (الروميات). He was ransomed in 966, and was killed in 968, when he raised a revolt against his nephew Sa'd al-Dawla, Sayf al-Dawla's successor. He is considered among the greatest figures of classical Arabic poetry.

== Life ==
Family tree of the Hamdanids

Abu Firas was born in 932 or 933, probably in Iraq and specifically in Baghdad, as his father Abi'l-Ala Sa'id—a son of the Hamdanid family's founder, Hamdan ibn Hamdun—occupied a distinguished position in the court of the Abbasid caliph al-Muqtadir (reigned 908–932). Abu Firas's mother was a Byzantine Greek slave concubine (an umm walad, freed after giving birth to her master's child). His maternal descent later was a source of scorn and taunts from his Hamdanid relatives, a fact reflected in his poems.

Abi'l-Ala Sa'id was killed in 935, during a dispute over possession of Mosul with his nephew, Nasir al-Dawla, and Abu Firas's mother fled to the protection of Nasir al-Dawla's brother, Sayf al-Dawla. When the latter occupied Aleppo and northern Syria in 944/5, Abu Firas was welcomed at his cousin's court. There he was raised under the supervision of Sayf al-Dawla, who also married his sister Sakhinah. Aside from being a renowned warrior, Sayf al-Dawla was famous for his patronage of scholars and poets, and the young Abu Firas grew up in a culturally vibrant atmosphere. Some of the finest minds of the Muslim world were assembled at the court of Aleppo: the preacher Ibn Nubata, the philosopher and musician al-Farabi, and the great poet al-Mutanabbi, while the grammarian Ibn Khalawayh served as Abu Firas' tutor.

Map of the Arab–Byzantine frontier zone, where Abu Firas was active

Abu Firas soon gave proof of both his martial as well as his literary ability, and in 947/8, when he was only 16, Sayf al-Dawla appointed him governor of Manbij, close to the border with the Byzantine Empire, to which the governorship of Harran was later added. Despite his youth, Abu Firas distinguished himself in the conflicts with the Nizari tribes of the Diyar Mudar and the Syrian Desert, as well as in his cousin's frequent raiding campaigns into Byzantine territory. Thus, in 952, he defeated the Byzantines under Bardas Phokas the Younger or his son Constantine Phokas, when the latter tried to interfere with Sayf al-Dawla's refortification of the towns of Ra'ban and Mar'ash in the frontier zone.

Abu Firas' captivity by the Byzantines is variously dated by the Arabic sources. According to Ibn Khallikan, he was first captured by the Byzantines in 959, but escaped captivity at the fortress of Kharshana by jumping into the Euphrates; this tale is however dismissed by some modern commentators. Most sources place his capture in 962 (in November, according to Ibn al-Athir). The Byzantine general Theodore Parsakoutenos led a raid of 1,000 or 1,300 men in the vicinity of Manbij, and when Abu Firas set out with only 70 men to obstruct their plundering, he was captured. Ibn Shaddad reports the story with slight differences, but states that the event took place in 959/960.

Parsakoutenos tried to have his high-ranking prisoner exchanged for his own brother and father, taken prisoners by Sayf al-Dawla at Hadath in 954. Despite sending repeated letters to his cousin pleading for his release, Abu Firas spent several years as a captive at the Byzantine capital Constantinople, as Sayf al-Dawla did not consider it proper to ransom him while leaving thousands of other captives to languish in captivity. Abu Firas was eventually released as part of a general prisoner exchange at Samosata in 966. During his captivity, Abu Firas wrote some of his finest poetry, the collection known as al-Rūmiyyāt (Rūm was the Arab name for the Byzantines). In the meantime, Abu Firas's mother had died, her passing a source of lamentation in Abu Firas's poetry.

After his release, Abu Firas was restored to his position and was named governor of Homs, but the situation was rapidly changing: less than a year after his release, Sayf al-Dawla died, and the Hamdanid emirate of Aleppo began to crumble. Abu Firas quickly quarreled with Sayf al-Dawla's 15-year-old heir, Abu'l-Ma'ali, the son of Abu Firas's sister, Sakhinah. Overestimating the support he enjoyed among the Arab tribes, Abu Firas revolted against his nephew, but was defeated and killed on 4 April 968 by Abu'l-Ma'ali's general Karghawayh. At the news of his death, Sakhinah was reportedly so overcome with grief, that she plucked out one of her own eyes.

== Work and legacy ==
Abu Firas enjoys a prominent position among the greats of classical Arabic poetry. His near-contemporary, the eminent scholar and statesman Sahib ibn Abbad, summed up the esteem in which Abu Firas was held already in the 10th century in a phrase that was frequently quoted by later authorities: "Poetry began with a king (i.e. Imru al-Qays) and ended with a king (i.e. Abu Firas)". The corpus of his works was edited after his death by Ibn Khalawayh, who also attached a commentary, largely written by Abu Firas himself. Nevertheless, in later times several manuscript versions of his works with significant variations between them were extant, which indicates that Ibn Khalawayh's edition was not the only one.

Abu Firas's early work comprises poems in the classical qaṣīda form in praise of the Hamdanids and their deeds—the 225-line Ḥamdāniyyah is perhaps the most notable—and shorter poems in the ʿIrāqī form on courtly themes of love, wine, hunting and friendship. He also produced several pro-Shia poems attacking the Abbasids. Although his early works and the al-Rūmiyyāt inevitably show al-Mutanabbi's influence, Abu Firas was the great poet's rival, encouraged by his tutor Ibn Khalawayh, a bitter opponent of al-Mutanabbi. According to H. A. R. Gibb, the qaṣīda poems "are remarkable for their sincerity, directness, and natural vigour", in contrast to the elaborate style of al-Mutanabbi, while the ʿIrāqī poems are merely "elegant trifles, formal and unoriginal". It is the al-Rūmiyyāt, however, and their "combination [...] of pathos, dignity, and pride" (El Tayib) that have secured Abu Firas's place among the greats of Arabic poetry. In addition, according to H. A. R. Gibb, his personal traits helped spread his reputation: from his noble descent and fair appearance, his bravery and generosity, to his tendency to egotism and over-reaching ambition, "he lived up to the Arab ideal of chivalry which he expressed in his poetry".

== Sources ==
- El Tayib, Abdullah (1990). "Abū Firās al-Ḥamdānī". In Ashtiany, Julia; Johnstone, T. M.; Latham, J. D.; Serjeant, R. B.; Smith, G. Rex (eds.). ʿAbbasid Belles-Lettres. Cambridge: Cambridge University Press. pp. 315–327. ISBN 0-521-24016-6.
- Gibb, H.A.R. (1960). "Abū Firās". In Gibb, H. A. R.; Kramers, J. H.; Lévi-Provençal, E.; Schacht, J.; Lewis, B. & Pellat, Ch. (eds.). The Encyclopaedia of Islam, Second Edition. Volume I: A–B. Leiden: E. J. Brill. pp. 119–120. doi:10.1163/1573-3912_islam_SIM_0183. OCLC 495469456.
- Lilie, Ralph-Johannes; Ludwig, Claudia; Pratsch, Thomas; Zielke, Beate (2013). Prosopographie der mittelbyzantinischen Zeit Online. Berlin-Brandenburgische Akademie der Wissenschaften. Nach Vorarbeiten F. Winkelmanns erstellt (in German). Berlin and Boston: De Gruyter.
