= Abdallah ibn Muhammad ibn Yazdad al-Marwazi =

Persian statesman in the service of Abbasids (d. 875 CE)

Abbasid Vizier
- In office 863–863
- Preceded by: Utamish
- Succeeded by: Muhammad ibn al-Fadl al-Jarjara'i

Personal details
- Died: 875
- Parent: Muhammad ibn Yazdad al-Marwazi

Abu Salih Abdallah ibn Muhammad ibn Yazdad al-Marwazi (Arabic: أبو صالح عبد الله بن محمد بن يزداد المروزي; died 875) was a senior Persian official of the Abbasid Caliphate in the mid-9th century. He briefly served as vizier (Arabic: wazir) during the caliphate of al-Musta'in (r. 862–866).

== Biography ==
Ibn Yazdad's family originally came from the city of Marw in Khurasan; his great-grandfather was a Zoroastrian convert to Islam. His father, Muhammad ibn Yazdad al-Marwazi, had been an official in the caliphal bureaucracy, and had served as the final secretary for the caliph al-Ma'mun prior to the latter's death in 833. Ibn Yazdad likewise chose a career in the civil service and became a government secretary (katib), working under the caliphs in Samarra. In 859 he is mentioned as being in charge of the Department of Control of Estates (diwan zimam al-diya), which oversaw the administration of state lands. In 862, at the beginning of al-Musta'in's caliphate, he was posted in Fars, but was soon after recalled to the capital to serve under the secretary Ahmad ibn al-Khasib.

In June 863, following the murder of the vizier Utamish, Ibn Yazdad was selected by al-Musta'in to succeed him in that office. During his vizierate, Ibn Yazdad attempted to improve the fiscal health of the government, and enacted harsh policies against the commanders of the army, as their salaries constituted a major drain on the state treasury. These measures soon provoked a backlash, however, and a number of military officers, including Bugha al-Sharabi, threatened to kill him. Faced with this hostility, Ibn Yazdad fled to Baghdad, bringing an end to his vizierate after only a few months.

Ibn Yazdad eventually returned to Samarra, and during the caliphate of al-Mu'tazz (r. 866–869) he became a prominent supporter of the Turkish general Salih ibn Wasif. When Salih launched his bid for power in 869 and arrested the senior officials Ahmad ibn Isra'il, al-Hasan ibn Makhlad and Abu Nuh Isa ibn Ibrahim, Ibn Yazdad encouraged him to torture and kill them. During this period al-Mu'tazz considered giving him the vizierate again, but it does not appear that he actually received the office. In December 869, however, Salih was forcibly removed from power by the rival general Musa ibn Bugha al-Kabir, and this seems to have ended Ibn Yazdad's influence in caliphal politics.

After Salih's fall from power, Ibn Yazdad was turned over to al-Hasan ibn Makhlad, although it is not specified what punishment he received, if any. He died in early 875.

== Notes ==
Preceded by Utamish	Vizier of the Abbasid Caliphate; 863	Succeeded by Muhammad ibn al-Fadl al-Jarjara'i
