= Ahmad ibn al-Khasib al-Jarjara'i =

Abbasid civil officer and al-Muntasir's Vizier

Ahmad ibn al-Khasib al-Jarjara'i أحمد بن الخصيب الجرجرائي
- Born: Abbasid Caliphate
- Died: c. 879; Crete, Abbasid Caliphate (now Crete, Greece)
- Other names: Ibn al-Khasib; Abu al-'Abbas; al-Jarjara'i
- Occupation: Abbasid civil officer
- Years active: Secretary of Ashinas (837/38–844); Secretary of Heir apparent al-Muntasir (until 861); Abbasid vizier (December 861 – August 862)
- Era: Abbasid
- Children: Abbas
- Father: Al-Khasib ibn 'Abd al-Hamid

Abu al-'Abbas Ahmad ibn al-Khasib al-Jarjara'i (Arabic: أبو العباس أحمد بن الخصيب الجرجرائي; died c. 879) was a civil officer of the Abbasid Caliphate in the mid-9th century, serving as vizier (Arabic: wazir) during the caliphate of al-Muntasir (r. 861–862). A major figure in the first year of the period known as the Anarchy at Samarra, his career at the caliphal court came to an end when he was forced into exile in mid-862.

== Biography ==
Ahmad was the son of al-Khasib ibn 'Abd al-Hamid, a finance officer in Egypt during the reign of Harun al-Rashid (r. 786–809). Early in Ahmad's career, he entered the service of the Turkic general Ashinas, becoming the latter's secretary (katib). In 838 he is mentioned as assisting Ashinas in thwarting a plot by several military officers to assassinate the caliph al-Mu'tasim (r. 833–842) during the Amorion campaign. During the reign of al-Wathiq (r. 842–847), he was one of the targets of a general crackdown against the government secretaries in 843-4, during which he and his subordinates were fined and forced to hand over one million gold dinars to the caliph. Under al-Mutawakkil (r. 847–861) he was assigned as secretary to al-Muntasir, the caliph's eldest son and heir.

Following the assassination of al-Mutawakkil by his Turkish bodyguards in December 861, Ahmad quickly worked to secure the succession for al-Muntasir. The army, secretaries and eminent men were assembled and Ahmad read to them an official version of the caliph's murder, claiming (falsely) that he had been killed by his favorite companion al-Fath ibn Khaqan. He also had an oath of allegiance drawn up and administered to everyone present. Al-Muntasir's younger brothers al-Mu'tazz and al-Mu'ayyad immediately recognized the new caliph, and al-Muntasir was able to establish his position without incident.

Ahmad, now serving as al-Muntasir's vizier, held a dominant position in the new caliph's administration. According to al-Tabari, he was able to get rid of a rival, the general Wasif al-Turki, by convincing the caliph to send him on a campaign at the Byzantine frontier. He also plotted with the Turkish officers to deprive al-Mu'tazz and al-Mu'ayyad of their rights to succeed al-Muntasir in the event of the latter's death, as they feared that al-Mu'tazz would eradicate them if he became caliph. Al-Muntasir eventually agreed to this and the two brothers were forced to abdicate their position as heirs apparent.

After the death of al-Muntasir in June 862, the officers Utamish, Bugha al-Kabir and Bugha al-Sharabi met to select a new caliph. Ahmad arranged for the mawlas in the army to accept whoever they decided upon, and gave his approval when the group chose al-Musta'in, a grandson of al-Mu'tasim. He became the new caliph's secretary, while Utamish became vizier.

Following a riot in favor of al-Mu'tazz at al-Musta'in's inauguration, Ahmad prevented the Turks from killing al-Mu'tazz and al-Mu'ayyad in retaliation, although he did order the brothers to be jailed instead. Shortly after this, however, the mawlas became hostile against Ahmad, and this resulted in his downfall. In July/August 862 he and his sons had their possessions confiscated and Ahmad was banished to Crete. He died there in 879.

His grandson, Ahmad ibn Ubayd Allah ibn Ahmad, more commonly known as al-Khasībī, remained vizier of caliphs al-Muqtadir and al-Qahir.

== Notes ==
| Preceded by Ubayd Allah ibn Yahya ibn Khaqan | Vizier of the Abbasid Caliphate; December 861 – August 862 | Succeeded by Utamish |
