= Qabiha =

Qabiha or Qabīḥah (“The Ugly”, floruit 869), was a concubine of the Abbasid Caliph Al-Mutawakkil (r. 847-861) and the mother of Caliph Al-Mu'tazz (r. 866-869). She is known to have been politically influental on behalf of her son during the Anarchy at Samarra (861-870).

== Life ==
Qabiha is noted to have originally been a Greek from the Byzantine Empire before she was captured and sold to slavery in the Abbasid Caliphate in accordance with the rules of a kafir of Dar al-Harb. She was enslaved by the vizier al-ʿAbbās ibn al-Ḥasan before she was placed in the Abbasid harem, possibly as a gift to the Caliph.

She was given the slave name Qabīḥah; the name means "ugly", but she was likely to have been beautiful; it was common to give names that described the opposite of reality to people with good qualities, in order to protect against the evil eye.

=== Life in Harem ===
After her arrival to the Caliphal harem, she was selected to serve as the concubine to caliph Al-Mutawakkil. She was described as the favorite concubine of the Caliph. She became the mother of Muhammad, the future Caliph al-Mu'tazz in 847, and of Ismaʿil ibn al-Mutawakkil.

She was also described as a poet. She reportedly preserved a poem by Abd Allāh Muḥammad ibn al-Muʿallā, which she had heard from him herself, and which was written down by her dictate, and therefore preserved.

The caliph al-Mutawakkil had created a plan of succession that would allow his sons to inherit the caliphate after his death; he would be succeeded first by his eldest son, al-Muntasir, then by al-Mu'tazz and third by al-Mu'ayyad. In 861, the Caliph Al-Mutawakkil was assassinated by his Turkic gilman soldiers with the help of his son and heir Al-Muntasir, which resulted in the extreme internal instability known as the Anarchy at Samarra (861-870) and civil war.

In 866, The Turkic commanders that supported her son Muhammad al-Mu'tazz as candidate to the throne, wrote to her in the harem and expressed their concern over the safety of her son. She wrote to the Turkic commander that guarded the captive Caliph al-Musta'in, Ahmad ibn Tulun, and asked him to give her the head of the abdicated Caliph in exchange for the position as Governor of Wasit. He replied that he could not betray his oath. After this reply, she replaced him as the guard of the imprisoned Caliph with another commander, Ibn Tulun, who killed him. Upon the death of the predecessor Caliph who abdicated in favour of her son al-Mu'tazz. She made her first attempt to secure her son's Caliphate.

=== Mother of the Caliph ===
Her son Al-Mu'tazz was proclaimed Caliph in 866 after a brutal civil war.

When her son the Caliph wished to keep the original succession plan of his father al-Mutawakkil and keep his half-brother Al-Mu'ayyad, the son of Habashiyaa from Abbessinia, heir of the throne, she had al-Muayyad killed, so that her son the Caliph appointed her younger son prince Ismail as his heir instead.

As Caliphal mother, Qabiha built up a personal fortune from inside the harem, via financing business enteprces through her agents. When a mutiny took place among the Turkic slave army in North Africa, her son the Caliph, aware of her fortune, asked her for a loan he could use to defeat it, but she refused.

When the mutiny eventually developed in to a rebellion that caused the death of her son in 869, she managed to eskaped from the Caliphal Palace via an underground passage in the company of her daughter. Two months later, she turned herself over along with her fortune of 1.8 million dirham, and the victorious Turkic commander commented that her fortune had killed her son, since she had been able to prevent the rebellion of she had lent it to him.

She was one of the women who was described by Ibn al-Sāʿīs (d. 1276) in his famous work over the consorts of the Abbasid Caliphs.

After the downfall and death of her son, she was exiled to Mecca along with her grandson Abdallah ibn al-Mu'tazz. Many years later upon returning to Baghdad soon after, her grandson Abdallah ibn al-Mu'tazz distanced himself from politics and lived the hedonistic life of a young prince. It was during this time that he wrote his poetry, devoted to the pleasures with which he was so familiar. Qabiha died in 877.
