= Ahmad ibn Isra'il al-Anbari =

Abu Ja'far Ahmad ibn Isra'il al-Anbari (Arabic: أبو جعفر أحمد بن إسرائيل الأنباري; 824 or 825 – September 8, 869) was a civil officer of the Abbasid Caliphate in the mid-9th century, serving as vizier during the caliphate of al-Mu'tazz (r. 866–869). His career came to a sudden end when he was arrested on the orders of the Turkish general Salih ibn Wasif in May 869, and he was killed four months later after being repeatedly subjected to torture.

== Biography ==
Ahmad, like several other officials in the Abbasid bureaucracy, came from a family of Nestorian Christian origin. He embarked on a career in the civil service and became a secretary (katib), serving under the Abbasid caliphs in Samarra. In 843-4, during the caliphate of al-Wathiq (r. 842–847), he was arrested as part of a general purge of the secretaries and was punished with a fine and flogging, but he was subsequently released and allowed to retain his office. Under al-Mutawakkil (r. 847–861), he became the chief secretary for the caliph's son and second heir al-Mu'tazz, and was also appointed as the vizier 'Ubaydallah ibn Yahya's deputy over the Department of Taxation (diwan al-kharaj).

During the civil war between the rival caliphs al-Musta'in and al-Mu'tazz in 865, Ahmad joined al-Musta'in after the latter fled to Baghdad, and remained in the city as it was besieged by al-Mu'tazz's army. As the war dragged on, however, he became a proponent of ending the conflict, and attempted to convince the governor of Baghdad, Muhammad ibn 'Abdallah ibn Tahir, to seek peace with al-Mu'tazz and force al-Musta'in to abdicate. After Muhammad ibn 'Abdallah agreed to sue for peace, Ahmad served as a leading member of the delegations sent to negotiate the terms of surrender, which resulted in al-Musta'in being deposed in January 866. As a reward for his efforts to end the war, al-Mu'tazz appointed Ahmad as the head of the Department of the Post (diwan al-barid) and shortly thereafter promoted him to be his vizier.

Ahmad remained vizier for most of al-Mu'tazz's caliphate (866–869), but his authority appears to have been limited. During his vizierate, the caliphate suffered from a major fiscal crisis, and the government was frequently incapable of paying the salaries of the soldiers. Ahmad also worked with the caliph to weaken the power of the senior Turkish officers, who had been in effective control of affairs in the capital since 861. In late 866 al-Mu'tazz attempted to remove Wasif al-Turki and Bugha al-Sharabi, two generals who had sided with al-Musta'in during the civil war, from power, but the caliph was forced to reverse his decision when the army protested this action, and after negotiating with the two men, Ahmad restored them to their positions. Despite this, al-Mu'tazz and Ahmad continued in their efforts to destroy the officers, and they succeeded in having Bugha killed in 868, which, combined with Wasif's death the previous year, resulted in the influence of the military being temporarily reduced.

Ultimately, however, the Turkish commanders successfully regained their power, and Ahmad's vizierate was brought down as a result. On May 19, 869, one of the Turkish leaders, Salih ibn Wasif, complained to the caliph about Ahmad and two other senior officials, al-Hasan ibn Makhlad and Abu Nuh 'Isa ibn Ibrahim, accusing them of corruption and of failing to pay the troops. A heated argument ensued between Salih and the three men, which ended when Salih's guards entered the room, apprehending the secretaries and hauling them away to the general's residence. Ahmad, al-Hasan and Abu Nuh were incarcerated and beaten, and an order was issued to seize the estates and properties of the officials and their families. They were not released until they promised to pay a large fine, which would be collected in installments.

In July 869, al-Mu'tazz was deposed and replaced with another caliph, al-Muhtadi. Shortly after the new caliph's accession, Salih ibn Wasif again seized the three secretaries and ordered them to be tortured, in an attempt to extract any remaining wealth they may still have had. Although al-Muhtadi disapproved of Salih's actions, he did nothing to stop him. On September 8, after securing a fatwa authorizing their execution, Salih had Ahmad and Abu Nuh brought to the public gate of the caliphal palace. There the two men were ordered to be flogged, with both men receiving five hundred lashes. After this, they were loaded onto donkeys and they were paraded around the city; both men died of their wounds during the procession.

== Notes ==
Preceded by Ja'far ibn Mahmud al-Iskafi	Vizier of the Abbasid Caliphate; 866 – May 869	Succeeded by Sulayman ibn Wahb
