= Shakiriyya =

Abbasid Cavalry regiment

The shākiriyya were a regular cavalry regiment of the Abbasid Caliphate in the "Samarra period" in the 9th century. Probably of Khurasani and Iranian origin, they were rivals of the Turkish guard, and played a major role in the court conflicts that marked the decade of the "Anarchy at Samarra" in the 860s.

== Origin ==
The term derives from the Persian chākir, "household servant", later also with the meaning of "bodyguard". The term appears in the Umayyad period, but exclusively for the native Iranian armed retinues of Transoxianian potentates, both Arabs and non-Arabs.

The term vanishes from the sources after the Abbasid Revolution, and reappears only in a letter by the Khurasani Iranian noble Tahir ibn Husayn to Caliph al-Ma'mun (r. 813–833), during civil war of the Fourth Fitna. It then appears as a distinct group in 839/840, in al-Tabari's history of the reign of al-Mu'tasim (r. 833–842).

By the reign of al-Wathiq, but likely already during the reign of al-Mu'tasim, they had been formed into a distinct contingent or regiment of the regular army. In the sources, they usually appear along with the jund, which in earlier times signified the free Arab warriors, as distinct from the Turkish corps of slave soldiers (mawālī or ghilmān) created by al-Mu'tasim. They were administered by a special fiscal department, the dīwān al-jund wa-al-shākiriyya.

In the sources they only appear as cavalry, and in small detachments of a few hundred, although the total force probably numbered a few thousand (but not likely more than 5,000). Unlike the Turks, who were concentrated around the Caliph in Samarra, the new capital established by al-Mu'tasim, the shākiriyya were spread out. They had cantonments not only in Samarra, but also in the old capital Baghdad, in Raqqa in Upper Mesopotamia, along the road to Mecca, in Egypt, Fars, and possibly also Adharbayjan.

== Ethnic composition and politics ==
Their ethnic composition is not discussed explicitly in the sources, but it appears that they were mostly of Khurasani Iranian origin, drawn from the troops that had fought for al-Ma'mun in the Fourth Fitna. In the list of cantonments of the regular regiments in Samarra a number of Khurasani commanders (quwwād) and their followers (aṣhāb) are mentioned as settled "in the jund and the shākiriyya", and in the few occasions where shākirī commanders are mentioned, their names denote a Khurasani origin. Hugh N. Kennedy suggested that these troops were raised by Tahir ibn Husayn for service in the west, and that the name was chosen as "a sort of honorific, referring back to a heroic and chivalrous past". Kennedy also suggested that remnants of the pre-civil war Abbasid army, the abnāʾ al-dawla, may have been incorporated in the jund and shākiriyya.

From their very origin, the shākiriyya were rivals of the Turks for power and influence at court; on his accession, Caliph al-Mutawakkil (r. 847–861) paid them double the donative given to the Turks, as a deliberate move to court their favour and use them as a counterbalance to the latter. Likewise, the shākiriyya appear to have been partisans of the Tahirid governors of Baghdad, the heirs of Tahir ibn Husayn, at least until the Abbasid civil war of 865–866.

== History ==
In 839/840, the governor of Yemen, Ja'far ibn Dinar al-Khayyat, attacked "those of the shākiriyya that were with him", causing the ire of al-Mu'tasim, who dismissed and briefly imprisoned him. In 844/845, when the Banu Sulaym Bedouin in the Hejaz became restive, al-Wathiq sent Hammad ibn Jarir al-Tabari with 200 shākiriyya to prevent them from entering Medina. As the rebellion continued, more troops under Bugha the Elder were dispatched, including Turks and shākiriyya. Bugha defeated the tribes and suppressed the uprising.

In 848/849, the shākiriyya participated in repeated efforts of quelling the resistance of the rebel Muhammad ibn al-Ba'ith ibn Halbas in Adharbayjan. Ibn al-Ba'ith had fortified himself with his followers in the city of Marand and withstood several Abbasid attacks, until Bugha al-Shabir managed to turn many of his supporters away with letters of pardon and safe-conduct (amān). In the same year, many of the shākiriyya escorted the prominent Turkish leader Itakh when he went on the Hajj, but when the latter entered Baghdad on his return journey, the local shākiriyya supported the moves of the Tahirid governor of Baghdad, Ishaq ibn Ibrahim al-Mus'abi which led to Itakh's arrest and death.

Forty shākiriyya horsemen participated along with 30 Turks and 30 Maghāriba horsemen in the escort for the prisoner exchange with the Byzantines in early 856. The presence of shākiriyya stationed in Egypt is mentioned by al-Tabari for 855/856, during the revolt of the Bujah people.

When a disgruntled faction of the Turks murdered Caliph al-Mutawakkil in 861, the jund and the shākiriyya gathered before the Public Gate of the palace to protest. In the summer of 862, a contingent of shākiriyya participated in the army of 10,000 men led by Wasif al-Turki against the Byzantine frontier region, that resulted in the capture of Faruriyyah. On 9 June 862, two days after the accession of al-Musta'in (r. 862–866), a group of fifty shākiriyya, joined by Tabariyya cavalry and other soldiers, as well as the "hotheads and the rabble from the market", charged the escort of the caliph, provided by the Ushrusaniyya and Maghariba regiments, shouting "Victory to al-Mu'tazz", the son of al-Mutawakkil who had been forced to renounce his succession rights in April, under pressure from the Turkish commanders. The riot was suppressed with heavy losses on both sides.

On 26 March 863, amidst the emotional response of the Baghdadi populace over the news of the recent death in battle against the Byzantines of two of the most distinguished Muslim commanders, Umar al-Aqta and Ali ibn Yahya al-Armani, the jund and the shākiriyya rioted in Baghdad, demanding their salaries. In 864/864, the jund and the shākiriyya in Fars rioted against the governor, the Tahirid Abdallah ibn Ishaq ibn Ibrahim, and looted his residence; Abdallah barely escaped with his own life, while one of his guests was killed.

During the siege of Baghdad in the civil war of 865–866, the shākiriyya were among the most important defenders of Baghdad and Caliph al-Musta'in against the Samarra forces, and shākiriyya flocked to the city from outlying garrisons as far as Raqqa and Malatya to sustain the struggle. One of the Tahirids, al-Husayn ibn Isma'il, was a commander of the shākiriyya during the conflict. When the Tahirid governor of Baghdad Muhammad ibn Abdallah ibn Tahir negotiated a settlement that ended the war with the recognition of the Samarra-based caliph al-Mu'tazz (r. 866–869), the shākiriyya felt betrayed, and rioted on 24 September 866, when their salaries fell in arrears.

They managed to maintain their position in Baghdad after Muhammad's death in 867, until Sulayman ibn Abdallah ibn Tahir, arrived from Khurasan in 869 with loyal troops of his own, led by a certain Muhammad ibn Aws al-Balkhi. Their arrival, and the demand that they now receive the proceeds of the Tahirid estates in Iraq, triggered a clash between the forces of Ibn Aws and the shākiriyya and the populace of Baghdad, who were led by junior members of the local Tahirid branch: al-Husayn ibn Isma'il and a former Tahirid mawla, al-Shah ibn Mikal. In the end, Ibn Aws and his men were expelled from the city and became brigands in the area of the Nahrawan Canal.

During the brief reign of al-Muhtadi (r. 869–870), the shākiriyya again opposed the Turks, bringing the Caliph to safety, and clashing openly with the Turks after the death of one of their commanders, Attab ibn Attab.

Following the rise of Caliph al-Mu'tamid (r. 870–892) and his brother al-Muwaffaq to power in 870, however, the shākiriyya disappear from record as a distinct body. It is likely that as part of al-Muwaffaq's deal with the Turks, the latter achieved a monopoly in the military, and all other groups, including the shākiriyya, were disbanded. The men of the shākiriyya may have been otherwise enrolled in the army after that, and it is certain that some of the figures associated with them remained in influential positions for some time—al-Husayn ibn Isma'il remained chief of police (ṣāḥib al-shurṭa) in Baghdad at least until 884/885—and according to Kennedy it is possible that some of the old shākiriyya soldiers served with them.

== See also ==
- Hujariyya (Abbasid troops)

== Bibliography ==
- Bosworth, C. E., ed. (1991). The History of al-Ṭabarī, Volume XXXIII: Storm and Stress Along the Northern Frontiers of the ʿAbbāsid Caliphate: The Caliphate of al-Muʿtasim, A.D. 833–842/A.H. 218–227. SUNY Series in Near Eastern Studies. Albany, New York: State University of New York Press. ISBN 978-0-7914-0493-5.
- Kennedy, Hugh (2001). The Armies of the Caliphs: Military and Society in the Early Islamic State. London and New York: Routledge. ISBN 0-415-25093-5.
- Kraemer, Joel L., ed. (1989). The History of al-Ṭabarī, Volume XXXIV: Incipient Decline: The Caliphates of al-Wāthiq, al-Mutawakkil and al-Muntaṣir, A.D. 841–863/A.H. 227–248. SUNY Series in Near Eastern Studies. Albany, New York: State University of New York Press. ISBN 978-0-88706-874-4.
- Saliba, George, ed. (1985). The History of al-Ṭabarī, Volume XXXV: The Crisis of the ʿAbbāsid Caliphate: The Caliphates of al-Mustaʿīn and al-Muʿtazz, A.D. 862–869/A.H. 248–255. SUNY Series in Near Eastern Studies. Albany, New York: State University of New York Press. ISBN 978-0-87395-883-7.
- Waines, David, ed. (1992). The History of al-Ṭabarī, Volume XXXVI: The Revolt of the Zanj, A.D. 869–879/A.H. 255–265. SUNY Series in Near Eastern Studies. Albany, New York: State University of New York Press. ISBN 978-0-7914-0763-9.
