= Al-Fath ibn Khaqan =

9th-century Abbasid official

Al-Fath ibn Khaqan الفتح بن خاقان
- Born: c. 817 CE; Abbasid Caliphate
- Died: 11 December 861 (aged 44); Samarra, Abbasid Caliphate
- Other name: ibn Khaqan
- Era: Islamic golden age (Abbasid era)
- Known for: Abbasid official of the court of the Caliph al-Mutawakkil, Adopted son of caliph al-Mu'tasim
- Parent: Khaqan ibn Urtuj
- Relatives: Muzahim (brother)

Al-Fatḥ ibn Khāqān (Arabic: الفتح بن خاقان) (c. 817/8 – 11 December 861) was an Abbasid official and one of the most prominent figures of the court of the Caliph al-Mutawakkil (r. 847–861). The son of a Turkic general of Caliph al-Mu'tasim, al-Fath was raised at the caliphal palace alongside the future al-Mutawakkil and adopted by al-Mu'tasim at age seven. With the accession of al-Mutawakkil, he occupied a series of official posts, including governor of Egypt and the Syrian provinces, but his power stemmed mainly from his close relationship to al-Mutawakkil, whose main adviser and confidant he was. A well-educated man and ardent bibliophile, al-Fath was himself a writer and a patron of writers, and assembled a large library at his palace at Samarra. He was assassinated by the Turkic guard alongside al-Mutawakkil.

== Origin and early life ==
Al-Fath was the son of Khaqan ibn Urtuj, a Turkic leader related to the ruling family of Ferghana. Coming from his homeland in Central Asia to serve in the caliphal army, Urtuj had risen to become one of the main commanders—alongside Ashinas, Wasif al-Turki, and al-Afshin—of the Turkish guard established by Caliph al-Mu'tasim (r. 833–842). Al-Fath was born around 817/8, as he was likely of age with the future al-Mutawakkil, along with whom he was raised and educated since infancy, and whose closest companion and confidant he became. At the age of seven, al-Fath was adopted by al-Mu'tasim. Indeed, as the historian Matthew Gordon comments, "a range of anecdotal evidence suggests that al-Fath and al-Mutawakkil were inseparable". Of his brothers, the most notable was Muzahim, who became a military officer and ended up as governor of Egypt, where he was succeeded by his son Ahmad.

== Role in government ==
Despite his prominence, few biographical details are known about al-Fath. Yaqut al-Hamawi reports that his career in government began under al-Mu'tasim and al-Wathiq (r. 842–847), but mentions no specific position. After the accession of al-Mutawakkil, al-Fath played a major role in the government, more by his status as the Caliph's chief adviser than by virtue of any official posts he held. Yaqut reports that he served as personal secretary to the Caliph, and was in charge of his official seal. Ibn Taghribirdi claims that he was in charge of the dīwān al-kharāj in 847/8, while both he and al-Kutubi report that he was also vizier. The latter is unlikely, since the position was occupied for most of al-Mutawakkil's reign by Ubayd Allah ibn Yahya ibn Khaqan (no relation). In c. 851 al-Fath served as al-Mutawakkil's chief of intelligence in Samarra, while in 856/7 and again in 860/1 he was appointed temporarily as governor of Egypt; on the latter occasion he may have acted as an envoy rather than governor, since al-Kindi categorically states that the governors of Egypt at the time represented the prince al-Muntasir, who was the nominal governor of the province. In 858, following al-Mutawakkil's short-lived attempt to transfer his capital to Damascus, al-Fath was also appointed governor of Syria. Here too his activity in that capacity is obscure, but there is some evidence that points to him taking an active role in the affairs of the province.

== Succession dispute and assassination ==
Al-Mutawakkil had appointed his oldest son, al-Muntasir, as his heir in 849/50, but slowly had shifted his favour to his second son, al-Mu'tazz. Al-Fath and the vizier Ubayd Allah encouraged the Caliph in his intention to replace al-Muntasir, and appear to have been backed by the traditional Abbasid elites as well. Conversely, al-Muntasir was backed by the Turkic and Maghariba guard troops.

In late autumn 861, matters came to a head: in October, al-Mutawakkil ordered the estates of the Turkic general Wasif to be confiscated and handed over to al-Fath. Feeling backed into a corner, the Turkic leadership began a plot to assassinate the Caliph. They were soon joined, or at least had the tacit approval, of al-Mustansir, who smarted from a succession of humiliations: on 5 December, on the recommendation of al-Fath and Ubayd Allah, he was bypassed in favour of al-Mu'tazz for leading the Friday prayer at the end of Ramadan, while three days later, when al-Mutawakkil was feeling ill and chose al-Mustansir to represent him on the prayer, once again Ubayd Allah intervened and persuaded the Caliph to go in person. Even worse, according to al-Tabari, on the next day al-Mutawakkil alternately vilified and threatened to kill his eldest son, and even had al-Fath slap him on the face. With rumours circulating that Wasif and the other Turkish leaders would be rounded up and executed on 12 December, the conspirators decided to act.

According to al-Tabari, a story later circulated that al-Fath and Ubayd Allah were forewarned of the plot by a Turkic woman, but had disregarded it, confident that no-one would dare carry it out. On the night of 10/11 December, about one hour after midnight, the Turks burst in the chamber where the Caliph and al-Fath were having supper. Al-Fath was killed trying to protect the Caliph, who was killed next. Al-Muntasir, who now assumed the caliphate, initially claimed that al-Fath had murdered his father, and that he had been killed after; within a short time, however, the official story changed to al-Mutawakkil choking on his wine. The murder of al-Mutawakkil began the tumultuous period known as "Anarchy at Samarra", which lasted until 870 and brought the Abbasid Caliphate to the brink of collapse.

== Cultural activity ==
Thoroughly assimilated into the Arabic culture, with an "impressive command of Arabic", al-Fath was a prominent member of Samarra's literary circle, and notable as a patron of many writers and poets, such as the writer al-Buhturi, or the historian al-Tha'labi. Perhaps his most notable protégé was Abu Uthman Amr ibn Bahr al-Jahiz, who dedicated his work Fi manaqib al-Turk ("On the Merits of the Turks") to his benefactor. Al-Fath was himself an author, but of his works only the titles of three books, and 13 verses have survived. He also assembled a large library, which contained many philosophical works, and which was frequented by many scholars of the time; the historian Hugh Kennedy calls him "the greatest bibliophile of his day". His palace in Samarra, built by his father, later became a caliphal residence, known as Jawsaq al-Khaqani.

== Family ==
His daughter Fatimah married al-Mu'tazz, the son of al-Mutawakkil.

== Sources ==
- Gordon, Matthew S. (2001). The Breaking of a Thousand Swords: A History of the Turkish Military of Samarra (A.H. 200–275/815–889 C.E.). Albany, New York: State University of New York Press. ISBN 0-7914-4795-2.
- Kennedy, Hugh (2004) [1986]. The Prophet and the Age of the Caliphates: The Islamic Near East from the 6th to the 11th Century (Second ed.). Harlow: Longman. ISBN 978-0-582-40525-7.
- Kennedy, Hugh (2006). When Baghdad Ruled the Muslim World: The Rise and Fall of Islam's Greatest Dynasty. Cambridge, Massachusetts: Da Capo Press. ISBN 978-0-306814808.
- Kraemer, Joel L., ed. (1989). The History of al-Ṭabarī, Volume XXXIV: Incipient Decline: The Caliphates of al-Wāthiq, al-Mutawakkil and al-Muntaṣir, A.D. 841–863/A.H. 227–248. SUNY Series in Near Eastern Studies. Albany, New York: State University of New York Press. ISBN 978-0-88706-874-4.
- Pinto, O. (1965). "al-Fatḥ b. K̲h̲āḳān". In Lewis, B.; Pellat, Ch. & Schacht, J. (eds.). The Encyclopaedia of Islam, Second Edition. Volume II: C–G. Leiden: E. J. Brill. pp. 837–838. doi:10.1163/1573-3912_islam_SIM_2320. OCLC 495469475.
