= Utamish =

Officer in the Abbasid Military

- Abu Musa Utamish اوتامش اتامش
- Born: Iraq
- Died: June 6, 863; Samārra, Abbasid Caliphate
- Spouse: Najla
- Children: Musa
- Relatives: Khatrakin (father); Bugha al-Kabir (uncle)
- Military career
- Allegiance: Abbasid Caliphate
- Branch: Abbasid Turkic regiment
- Service years: c. 860 – 863

Abu Musa Utamish (Arabic: اوتامش، اتامش) (died June 6, 863) was a Turkic military officer of the Abbasid Caliphate. He played an important role in the first years of the period known as the Anarchy at Samarra, during which he rapidly became one of the most powerful officials in the government. He was appointed as vizier upon the caliph al-Musta'in's ascension in 862, but was assassinated after approximately a year in office.

== Biography ==
Utamish was born in Iraq, the son of a man named Khatrakin; he may also have been a nephew of Bugha al-Kabir. He appears during the reign of al-Wathiq (r. 842–847) as one of the caliph's ghilman. At some point he was attached to the service of al-Muntasir, the eldest son and heir of al-Mutawakkil (r. 847–861). Utamish eventually established a strong relationship with the young prince, and was known as "sahib al-Muntasir."

According to al-Mas'udi, Utamish was instrumental in al-Muntasir's attempts to win over the loyalty of the Turks in the army, a move which caused hostility between al-Mutawakkil and al-Muntasir. Al-Ya'qubi states that Utamish was one of the officers who assassinated al-Mutawakkil in December 861, although this is not verified by other accounts of the incident. In any case, al-Mutawwakil's killing resulted in al-Muntasir becoming caliph; during his short reign (861–862), Utamish and the vizier Ahmad ibn al-Khasib were among the most prominent men in his government.

Following al-Muntasir's death in June 862, Utamish and the officers Bugha al-Kabir and Bugha al-Sharabi met to select a new caliph, eventually deciding on al-Musta'in (r. 862–866), a grandson of al-Mu'tasim. Utamish seems to have held a strong influence on al-Musta'in and became one of the most powerful individuals in the new administration; he was appointed as vizier and given control over the treasury, and additionally received the governorships of Egypt and the Maghrib. Al-Musta'in further entrusted him with the supervision of his son al-'Abbas.

Over the course of the first year of al-Musta'in's reign, Utamish enjoyed full control over the caliph and his affairs; in the opinion of the historian Dominique Sourdel, he was "un véritable régent de l'empire." As vizier, he seems to have managed little of the day-to-day administration, leaving his secretary Shuja' ibn al-Qasim to handle it instead. Utamish and Shuja' seem to have initially shared power with Ahmad ibn al-Khasib, until the latter was exiled in July 862.

Utamish's dominance over the government soon caused him to make enemies in the army and bureaucracy. He and several other officials stole from the treasury, which caused discontent among the poorly-paid mawlas. Utamish also excluded the influential officers Bugha al-Sharabi and Wasif al-Turki from power, and the two retaliated by plotting his downfall. On June 4, 863, the Turks and Faraghina marched out from their cantonments in Samarra and advanced toward the Jawsaq Palace against Utamish. The vizier attempted to seek refuge with al-Musta'in but was refused; two days later, the troops entered the palace and seized Utamish. He and Shuja' were killed and Utamish's residence was plundered.

== Notes ==
Preceded by Ahmad ibn al-Khasib	Vizier of the Abbasid Caliphate; June 862 – June 863	Succeeded by 'Abdallah ibn Muhammad ibn Yazdad al-Marwazi
