= Maghariba (Abbasid troops) =

Regiment in the regular army of Abbasid Caliphate

The Maghariba (Arabic: المغاربة, romanized: al-Maghāribah, lit. 'Westerners/Maghrebis') were a regiment in the regular army of the Abbasid Caliphate. The unit was formed in the early ninth century A.D. and consisted of soldiers who were of Maghrebi origin. During their history, the Maghariba participated in several military campaigns and played a significant role in the politics of the central government.

== Characteristics ==
The origin and composition of the Maghariba have been subject to debate. Historians have variously described the Maghariba as Berbers from North Africa, black slaves from East Africa, and Arab tribesmen from Egypt, with the last being the most widely accepted theory. According to the Muslim historian al-Mas'udi, the regiment was created by Caliph al-Mu'tasim (r. 833–842), who recruited troops from the Hawf districts of Egypt; this likely occurred before al-Mu'tasim's caliphate, when he and al-Afshin were serving in Egypt on behalf of the caliph al-Ma'mun (r. 813–833).

After the succession of al-Mu'tasim to the caliphate in 833, the Maghariba formed a contingent of his new army, along with other units such as the Turks, the Faraghina, the Ushrusaniyya, and the shakiriyya. Together with the rest of the army, they were granted their own section in al-Mu'tasim's new capital city of Samarra; their allotments were along the Gulf Street (shāri' al-khalīj) adjacent to the bank of the Tigris, and the Azlakh quarter was known as a Maghribi neighborhood.

The Maghariba appear to have served as infantry, and they were a mixture of free men and slaves. They were likely fewer in number than the Turks, and they were certainly of inferior status. Their pay also appears to have been lower; on the accession of al-Mutawakkil (r. 847–861), the new caliph ordered that the Maghariba be given lower allotments than the rest of the army, and in 870 al-Muhtadi (r. 869–870) arranged for the Maghariba to be paid one dirham a day, while the Turks and other units received two.

== History ==
The Maghariba served under al-Mu'tasim and several of his successors

The Maghariba participated in al-Mu'tasim's campaign against Amorium in 838, during which they were under the overall command of Itakh. During the caliphates of al-Wathiq (r. 842–847) and al-Mutawakkil (r. 847–861) they took part in a number of Bugha al-Kabir's campaigns. In 845 they served under Bugha during his punitive expedition against the disorderly Banu Sulaym in the vicinity of Medina. In 848–49 they were sent by Bugha to help quell a revolt in Adharbayjan, and in 852 they fought in his campaign to defeat Ishaq ibn Isma'il, the rebel governor of Tiflis. In 855–56 several Maghariba were selected to provide escort for a prisoner exchange with the Byzantines.

Following the assassination of al-Mutawakkil in December 861, the Maghariba played an important role during the events of the Anarchy at Samarra (861–870). On the day that al-Muntasir was given the oath of allegiance (bay'ah), the Maghariba were employed as riot troops against residents in the capital who opposed the new caliph. After al-Muntasir's death in 862 they, together with the Turks and Ushrusaniyya, agreed to recognize al-Musta'in as caliph, and they were again used to attack rioters who favored al-Musta'in's rival al-Mu'tazz. In the following year, during a particularly severe riot in Samarra, the Maghariba looted the homes of several civilians; a few months later, having become increasingly dissatisfied with the current regime, they organized in the capital to voice their agitation, but they ultimately decided to take no action and dispersed.

When civil war broke out between al-Musta'in and al-Mu'tazz in 865, the Maghariba fought in support of the latter. Two thousand Maghariba under the command of Muhammad ibn Rashid al-Maghribi were part of the initial force sent from Samarra to besiege al-Musta'in in Baghdad, and over the course of the war they participated in several battles. Their involvement continued until the end of the war, from which al-Mu'tazz emerged victorious and al-Musta'in was forced to abdicate.

After the war, the Maghariba continued returned to Samarra, which soon again suffered from disorder. In 866 a conflict broke out between the Maghariba and the Turkish soldiers, and during the ensuing violence two senior Maghariba commanders were killed by the Turks. Two years later the Maghariba killed the Turkish general Bugha al-Sharabi and brought his head to the caliph. In 869, however, the Maghariba united with the Turks and Faraghina to successfully depose al-Mu'tazz. Under al-Mu'tazz's successor, al-Muhtadi, they participated in some of the initial campaigns against the Zanj rebels in southern Iraq. In 870, during the revolt against al-Muhtadi, the Maghariba remained loyal to the caliph; they unsuccessfully defended him against the mutinous Turkish soldiers, and suffered high casualties as a result.

The accession of al-Mu'tamid (r. 870–892) seems to have resulted in the decline of the Maghariba. Al-Mu'tamid's brother Abu Ahmad al-Muwaffaq, who became the commander-in-chief of the army, enjoyed strong relations with the Turkish commanders, and under him the Turks came to dominate the military, to the exclusion of the Maghariba and other units. After this point, the Maghariba are seldom mentioned in the sources. A government budget drawn up in 892–93 lists "Maghariba" as forming a contingent of the bodyguards of the caliph al-Mu'tadid (r. 892–902), but it is not specified as to whether this was the same unit as the Samarran Maghariba.
