= Capture of Faruriyyah =

Battle between Abbasid Caliphate and Byzantines in c. 862

- Part of the Arab–Byzantine wars
- Map of Byzantine Asia Minor and the Byzantine-Arab frontier region in the middle of the 9th century
| Date | Summer 862 |
| Location | Syrian frontier region, near Tarsus |
| Result | Abbasid victory; Fortress of Faruriyyah conquered by the Abbasids |

Belligerents
| Abbasid Caliphate | Byzantine Empire |

Commanders and leaders
| Wasif al-Turki | Unknown |

Strength
| 10,000 or more | Unknown |

The Capture of Faruriyyah in 862 was a military campaign conducted by the Abbasid Caliphate against the Byzantine (Eastern Roman) Empire. Planned during the short caliphate of al-Muntasir (r. 861–862), it was commanded by the Turkish general Wasif, and was intended to strike against Byzantine defensive positions in southern Anatolia. Originally envisioned as a major multi-year operation, the campaign was cut short in the aftermath of the death of al-Muntasir, and only scored a minor success with the capture of the fortress of Faruriyyah.

== Background ==
Al-Muntasir became caliph on December 11, 861, after his father al-Mutawakkil was assassinated by members of his Turkish guard. Although he was suspected of being involved in the plot to kill al-Mutawakkil, he was able to quickly take control of affairs in the capital city of Samarra and receive the oath of allegiance from the leading men of the state. Al-Muntasir's sudden elevation to the caliphate served to benefit several of his close associates, who gained senior positions in the government after his ascension. Included among these were his secretary, Ahmad ibn al-Khasib, who became vizier, and Wasif, a senior Turkish general who had likely been heavily involved in al-Mutawakkil's murder.

Shortly after securing his position as caliph, al-Muntasir decided to send an army against the Byzantines. According to the historian al-Tabari, this decision was prompted by Ahmad ibn al-Khasib; the vizier had recently had a falling out with Wasif, and he sought to find an excuse to get him out of the capital. Ahmad ultimately decided that the best way to accomplish this was to put him at the head of a military campaign. He was eventually able to convince the caliph to go along with the plan, and al-Muntasir ordered Wasif to head to the Byzantine frontier.

== Planning and preparations ==
Regardless of the motivations for the expedition, Wasif seems to have had no objection to his assignment, and preparations for the operation soon began. Although the traditional annual summer raids (sawaʾif) against the Byzantine Empire had been maintained by local frontier commanders like 'Ali ibn Yahya al-Armani and 'Umar ibn 'Abdallah al-Aqta during the reign of al-Mutawakkil, this was to be the first large-scale expedition in several years that the central government planned to send against the Byzantines, and the caliph was prepared to put a large amount of resources into the venture.

"The [caliph] desires to come close to God by waging holy war against His enemy, by carrying out His obligations in the religion that He entrusted him with, and seeking proximity to Him by strengthening His friends and permitting injury and revenge against those who deviate from His religion, deny His messengers, and disobey Him.

Pursuant to the above, he has seen fit to urge Wasif...to march this year to the territory of the enemies of God, the Roman infidels, to mount a campaign..."

— Excerpt from al-Muntasir's proclamation of the campaign.

The campaign was planned to be a major affair. Wasif was to command upwards of ten thousand troops, consisting of the regular army, the mawlās and the shākiriyyah. In addition, a recruitment drive to gain volunteers for the campaign was ordered by al-Muntasir. On March 13, 862 a proclamation announcing the campaign was issued; it characterized the upcoming expedition as a holy war and extolled Wasif as a fine leader and a loyal servant of the caliph.

Officers were assigned to specific roles in the army; Muzahim ibn Khaqan was put in charge of the vanguard, Muhammad ibn Raja' of the rear guard, al-Sindi ibn Bukhtashah of the right flank, and Nasr ibn Sa'id al-Maghribi of the siege machines. Abu al-Walid al-Jariri al-Bajali was appointed to handle the army's expenditures and to oversee the distribution of spoils. A timetable for the expedition was drafted; Wasif and the army were scheduled to arrive at the frontier outpost of Malatya (the Greek Melitene) on June 15, 862, and were to invade Byzantine territory on July 1. After attacking Byzantine positions throughout the summer, Wasif was to remain at the frontier and launch additional campaigns over the next four years, until he received further instructions from the caliph.

== The Campaign ==
Having completed their preparations for the campaign, Wasif and the army departed for the Byzantine frontier in early 862. Upon arriving at the Syrian side of the frontier zone, they set up camp there in preparation for their incursions into Byzantine territory.

Before Wasif had a chance to make any serious progress against the Byzantines, however, the campaign was overshadowed by events back at the capital. After a reign of only six months, al-Muntasir died around the beginning of June, of either illness or poison. Following his death, the vizir Ahmad ibn al-Khasib and a small group of senior Turkish commanders met and decided to appoint al-Musta'in as caliph in his stead. They presented their decision to the Samarran military regiments, and were eventually able to force the soldiers to swear allegiance to their candidate.

The death of al-Muntasir did not immediately result in the termination of the military campaign. Wasif, upon learning of the passing of the caliph, decided that he should still persist with the operation, and led his forces into Byzantine territory. The army advanced against a Byzantine fortress called Faruriyyah in the region of Tarsus. The defenders of the fortress were defeated and the stronghold was conquered by the Muslims.

Ultimately, however, the change of government in Samarra brought the expedition to a premature conclusion. The ascension of al-Musta'in could not be ignored indefinitely by Wasif; having already missed the opportunity to play a role in the selection of the new caliph, he needed to make sure his interests back in the capital were protected. As a result, he decided to abandon the Byzantine front, and by 863 he was back in Samarra.

== Aftermath ==
In the year following the campaign, the Byzantine military scored major successes on the frontier, defeating the Muslims at the decisive Battle of Lalakaon and killing the veteran commanders 'Umar ibn 'Abdallah and 'Ali ibn Yahya.
