= Muhammad ibn Bugha =

9th century Abbasid military officer

Muhammad ibn Bugha أبو نصر محمد بن بغا
- Born: Abbasid Caliphate
- Died: c. 870; Samārra, Abbasid Caliphate
- Children: Nasr
- Relatives: Musa ibn Bugha al-Kabir (brother)
- Military career
- Allegiance: Abbasid Caliphate
- Branch: Abbasid Turkic regiment
- Service years: c. 864 – 870
- Rank: Military officer
- Conflicts: Abbasid civil war (865–866)

Abu Nasr Muhammad ibn Bugha (Arabic: أبو نصر محمد بن بغا) was a ninth-century military officer in the service of the Abbasid Caliphate.

He was the son of Bugha al-Kabir, a Turkic slave soldier (ghulam) and prominent army general. He is first mentioned during the civil war of 865–866, when he was responsible for seizing and defending the town of al-Anbar on behalf of al-Mu'tazz. He later played a leading role in the deposition of al-Mu'tazz in 869, when he, Salih ibn Wasif, and Bayakbak headed the party that arrested the caliph. Following the arrival of his brother Musa ibn Bugha in Samarra that same year, Muhammad joined his side and was subsequently ranked as one of the senior commanders in his faction.

During the breakdown in relations between the caliph al-Muhtadi and the Turkish leadership in June 870, Muhammad and his brother were targeted by attempts to incite the residents of Samarra against them. Following accusations that he and Musa were guilty of expropriating revenues, Muhammad was seized and placed into prison, and was shortly afterwards put to death. His fate contributed to the decision by the Samarran regiments to overthrow al-Muhtadi later that month.
