= Al-Mu'ayyad =

Abbasid prince and governor of Syria (850–861)

Al-Mu'ayyad المؤيد

Governor of Syria
- In office 850 – 855
- Monarch: Al-Mutawakkil
- Preceded by: Malik ibn Tawk (847–850)
- Succeeded by: al-Fath ibn Hakan al-Turki (856–861)
- In office 856 – 861
- Monarch: Al-Mutawakkil
- Deputy: al-Fath ibn Hakan al-Turki

Personal details
- Born: 842/844 Samarra, Abbasid Caliphate (now Iraq)
- Died: 866 Samarra, Abbasid Caliphate
- Parents: Al-Mutawakkil (father); Umm Ishaq (mother)
- Relatives: Al-Muntasir (brother); Al-Musta'in (cousin); Al-Mu'tazz (brother); Al-Muhtadi (cousin); Al-Mu'tamid (brother)

Ibrahim ibn Jaʽfar al-Mutawakkil (Arabic: ابراهيم بن جعفر المتوكل; died 866), better known by his laqab al-Mu'ayyad (المؤيد), was an Abbasid prince, the third son of the Abbasid caliph al-Mutawakkil, He was the governor of Syria from 850 to 861 and also for a time third-in-line to the Abbasid throne.

Al-Mua'yyad was the brother of al-Muntasir and al-Mu'tazz, who both would eventually become caliphs as well.

== Biography ==
=== Early life, nomination as heir and governor of Syria ===
Al-Mu'ayyad was the son of Al-Mutawakkil and his concubine, Umm Ishaq, an Andalusian concubine.

His father, caliph al-Mutawakkil, had created a plan of succession that would allow his sons to inherit the caliphate after his death; he would be succeeded first by his eldest son, al-Muntasir, then by al-Mu'tazz and third by al-Mu'ayyad.

In 849, al-Mutawakkil arranged for his succession, by appointing three of his sons as heirs and assigning them the governance and proceeds of the Empire's provinces: the eldest, al-Muntasir, was named first heir, and received governorship of Egypt, the Jazira, and the proceeds of the rents in the capital, Samarra; al-Mu'tazz was charged with supervising the domains of the governor in the Khorasan; and al-Mu'ayyad was placed in charge of Syria. During the reign of his father al-Mutawakkil, as a son and heir to the throne, al-Mu'ayyad took up residence in the great Al-Matira palace.

=== Assassination of his father Al-Mutawakkil ===
His father, Al-Mutawakkil had nominated his oldest son, al-Muntasir, as his first heir in 849/50, but slowly had shifted his favor to his second son, al-Mu'tazz, encouraged by al-Fath ibn Khaqan and the vizier Ubayd Allah ibn Yahya ibn Khaqan. This rivalry extended into the political sphere, as al-Mu'tazz's succession appears to have been backed by the traditional Abbasid elites as well, while al-Muntasir was backed by the Turkic and Maghariba guard troops. In late autumn 861, matters came to a head: in October, al-Mutawakkil ordered the estates of the Turkic general Wasif to be confiscated and handed over to al-Fath. Feeling backed into a corner, the Turkic leadership began a plot to assassinate the Caliph. They were soon joined, or at least had the tacit approval, of al-Muntasir, who smarted from a succession of humiliations: on 5 December, on the recommendation of al-Fath and Ubayd Allah, he was bypassed in favor of al-Mu'tazz for leading the Friday prayer at the end of Ramadan, while three days later, when al-Mutawakkil was feeling ill and chose al-Muntasir to represent him on the prayer, once again Ubayd Allah intervened and persuaded the Caliph to go in person. Even worse, according to the historian al-Tabari, on the next day, al-Mutawakkil alternately vilified and threatened to kill his eldest son, and even had al-Fath slap him on the face. With rumors circulating that Wasif and the other Turkish leaders would be rounded up and executed on 12 December, the conspirators decided to act.

According to al-Tabari, a story later circulated that al-Fath and Ubayd Allah were forewarned of the plot by a Turkic woman, but had disregarded it, confident that no one would dare carry it out. On the night of 10/11 December, about one hour after midnight, the Turks burst in the chamber where the caliph and al-Fath were having supper. Al-Fath was killed trying to protect the Caliph, who was killed next. Al-Muntasir, who now assumed the caliphate, initially claimed that al-Fath had murdered his father and that he had been killed after; within a short time, however, the official story changed to al-Mutawakkil choking on his drink.

=== Later life ===
The Turkic regiments then prevailed on al-Muntasir to remove his brothers from the succession, fearing revenge for the murder of their father. In their place, he was to appoint his son as heir-apparent. On April 27, 862, both brothers, al-Mu'ayyad and al-Mu'tazz, wrote a statement of abdication. During al-Muntasir's short reign (r. 861–862), the Turks convinced him to remove al-Mu'tazz and al-Mu'ayyad from the succession. When al-Muntasir died of unknown causes, the Turkic officers gathered together and decided to install the dead caliph's cousin al-Musta'in (al-Mutawakkil's Nephew) on the throne.

The new caliph was almost immediately faced with a large riot in Samarra in support of the disenfranchised al-Mu'tazz; the rioters were put down by the military, but casualties on both sides were heavy. Al-Musta'in, worried that al-Mu'tazz or al-Mua'yyad could press their claims to the caliphate, first attempted to buy them off and then threw them in prison.

=== Complete removal as heir of al-Mu'tazz and Death ===
In 866, al-Musta'in was deposed and al-Mu'tazz came into power. Immediately upon becoming the new Caliph, al-Mu'tazz had the former Caliph al-Musta'in executed. The Turkish soldiery, after a brawl with the Maghariba troops, now turned their support to al-Mu'ayyad. Enraged by this predicament, the jealous Caliph had his brother, al-Mu'ayyad, being next heir to the throne, imprisoned along with another brother, Abu Ahmad, who had bravely led the troops in the late struggle on his side. His brother, Abu Ahmad was initially received with honour by the Caliph al-Mu'tazz, but six months later he was thrown into prison as a potential rival, along with another of his brother, al-Mu'ayyad. Abu Ahmad survived due to the protection of the military regiments. Eventually, he was released and exiled to Basra before being allowed to return to Baghdad, where he was forced to reside at the Qasr al-Dinar palace in East Baghdad.

The Turkic soldiers attempted to release al-Mu'ayyad, but al-Mu'tazz, the more alarmed, resolved on his death. He was smothered in a downy robe (or, as others say, frozen in a bed of ice); and the body was then exposed before the Court, as if, being without mark of violence, he had died a natural death (a transparent subterfuge).

== Myth about his death ==
This period saw the rise of a legend that an Abbasid prince had converted to Christianity under the influence of Theodore of Edessa, taken the name "John" and been killed for his apostasy; Alexander Vasiliev speculates that Muayyad may have been the convert. However, there is no Christian or Muslim record remotely associating Muayyad with Christianity or even, indeed, religious speculation. The motives for his murder seem to have been purely political; had he indeed converted, it would have given Mutazz an excuse to murder him for apostasy and been recorded.

== See also ==
- Abdallah ibn al-Mu'tazz, nephew of al-Mu'ayyad.
- Al-Mufawwid, nephew of al-Mu'ayyad.
