= Al-Muntasir =

11th Abbasid Caliph (r. 861–862)

al-Muntasir bi-llah المنتصر بالله
- Khalifah; Amir al-Mu'minin
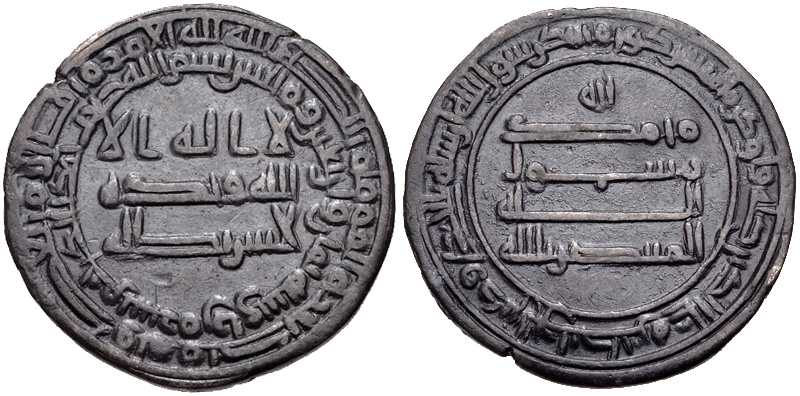
- Dirham of al-Muntasir minted in Samarra in 862

11th Caliph of the Abbasid Caliphate
- Reign: 11 December 861 – 7 June 862
- Predecessor: al-Mutawakkil
- Successor: al-Musta'in
- Born: November 837; Samarra, Abbasid Caliphate (modern Iraq)
- Died: 7 June 862 (aged 24); Samarra, Abbasid Caliphate (modern Iraq)
- Burial: Samarra, now Saladin Governorate, Iraq
- Issue: Ahmad; Abd al-Wahab; Ubaydullah
Names
- Abu Ja'far Muḥammad ibn Ja'far ibn Muḥammad ibn Hārūn al-Muntasir biʾLlāh
- Dynasty: Abbasid
- Father: al-Mutawakkil
- Mother: Hubshiya
- Religion: Sunni Islam

Abu Ja'far Muḥammad ibn Ja'far ibn Muḥammad ibn Hārūn al-Muntasir biʾLlāh (Arabic: أبو جعفر محمد; November 837 – 7 June 862), better known by his regnal title al-Muntasir biʾLlāh (المنتصر بالله, "He who triumphs in God") was the caliph of the Abbasid Caliphate from 861 to 862, during the "Anarchy at Samarra". The power struggle between al-Muntasir and his brother, al-Mu'tazz, backed by different factions, climaxed with the Turkic leaders plotting the murder of his father al-Mutawakkil. Following the assassination in 861, al-Muntasir assumed the caliphate with Turkic support.

He adopted a more favorable policy toward Shia Muslims than his father. He relaxed several restrictions imposed on the Alids, permitted visitation to the Imam Husayn Shrine in Karbala, and restored some property and privileges to members of the Alid family, including Fadak. He also maintained a favorable relationship with Ali al-Hadi, the tenth of the Twelve Imams. Al-Muntasir engaged in military actions against the Byzantines, led by his general Wasif al-Turki, but his sudden death in June 862 resulted in a change of leadership, and al-Musta'in succeeded him as caliph. The military campaign continued briefly, with Wasif achieving success before returning to Samarra due to the change in government.

== Early life ==
Family tree of the Abbasid caliphs of the ninth century

Al-Muntasir was the eldest son of Abu al-Fadl Ja'far (future Abbasid caliph al-Mutawakkil). At the time of his birth, his father was fourteen years old. His given name was Muhammad. Al-Muntasir's mother was Hubshiya, a Greek slave.

In 849, al-Mutawakkil arranged for his succession, by appointing three of his sons as heirs and assigning them the governance and proceeds of the Empire's provinces: the eldest, al-Muntasir, was named first heir, and received the governorship of Egypt, the Jazira, and the proceeds of the rents in the capital, Samarra; al-Mu'tazz was charged with supervising the domains of the governor in the Khorasan; and al-Mu'ayyad was placed in charge of Syria.

Muhammad ibn Jarir al-Tabari records that in 236 AH (850–851) al-Muntasir led the pilgrimage. The previous year al-Mutawakkil had named his three sons as heirs and seemed to favor al-Muntasir. However, afterward, this seemed to change and al-Muntasir feared his father was going to move against him. So, he decided to strike first. Under his father, al-Mutawakkil (r. 847–861) Al-Muntasir was assigned a secretary as the caliph's eldest son and heir. His secretary was Ahmad ibn al-Khasib al-Jarjara'i. As a prince, al-Muntasir fathered some children including Ahmad, Abd al-Wahab, and Ubayd Allah.

As an elder prince and heir, al-Muntasir offered the funeral prayer of his grandmother Umm Ja'far Shuja, who died on 19 June 861 in al-Ja'fariyyah and she was buried in the Friday Mosque.

=== Involvement in the assassination of al-Mutawakkil ===
Al-Mutawakkil had appointed his oldest son, al-Muntasir, as his heir in 849/50, but slowly had shifted his favor to his second son, al-Mu'tazz, encouraged by al-Fath ibn Khaqan and the vizier Ubayd Allah ibn Yahya ibn Khaqan. This rivalry extended into the political sphere, as al-Mu'tazz's succession appears to have been backed by the traditional Abbasid elites as well, while al-Muntasir was backed by the Turkic and Maghariba guard troops. In late autumn 861, matters came to a head: in October, al-Mutawakkil ordered the estates of the Turkic general Wasif to be confiscated and handed over to al-Fath. Feeling backed into a corner, the Turkic leadership began a plot to assassinate the Caliph. They were soon joined, or at least had the tacit approval, of al-Muntasir, who smarted from a succession of humiliations: on 5 December, on the recommendation of al-Fath and Ubayd Allah, he was bypassed in favor of al-Mu'tazz for leading the Friday prayer at the end of Ramadan, while three days later, when al-Mutawakkil was feeling ill and chose al-Muntasir to represent him on the prayer, once again Ubayd Allah intervened and persuaded the Caliph to go in person. Even worse, according to the historian al-Tabari, on the next day, al-Mutawakkil alternately vilified and threatened to kill his eldest son, and even had al-Fath slap him on the face. With rumors circulating that Wasif and the other Turkish leaders would be rounded up and executed on 12 December, the conspirators decided to act.

According to al-Tabari, a story later circulated that al-Fath and Ubayd Allah were forewarned of the plot by a Turkic woman, but had disregarded it, confident that no one would dare carry it out. On the night of 10/11 December, about one hour after midnight, the Turks burst in the chamber where the caliph and al-Fath were having supper. Al-Fath was killed trying to protect the Caliph, who was killed next. Al-Muntasir, who now assumed the caliphate, initially claimed that al-Fath had murdered his father and that he had been killed after; within a short time, however, the official story changed to al-Mutawakkil choking on his drink. Al-Mutawakkil was assassinated by a Turkish soldiers on Wednesday December 10th, 861.

== Reign ==
Al-Muntasir became caliph on December 11, 861, after his father al-Mutawakkil was assassinated by members of his Turkic guard. Although he was suspected of being involved in the plot to kill al-Mutawakkil, he was able to quickly take control of affairs in the capital city of Samarra and receive the oath of allegiance from the leading men of the state. Al-Muntasir's sudden elevation to the Caliphate served to benefit several of his close associates, who gained senior positions in the government after his ascension. Included among these were his secretary, Ahmad ibn al-Khasib, who became vizier, and Wasif, a senior Turkic general who had likely been heavily involved in al-Mutawakkil's murder.

Al-Muntasir's secretary Ahmad ibn al-Khasib quickly worked to secure the succession for al-Muntasir. The army, secretaries and eminent men were assembled and Ahmad ibn al-Khasib read to them an official version of the caliph's murder, claiming (falsely) that he had been killed by his favorite companion al-Fath ibn Khaqan. He also had an Bay'ah drawn up and administered to everyone present. Al-Muntasir's younger brothers al-Mu'tazz and al-Mu'ayyad immediately recognized the new caliph, and al-Muntasir was able to establish his position without incident.

Ahmad ibn al-Khasib, now serving as al-Muntasir's vizier, held a dominant position in the new caliph's administration. According to al-Tabari, he was able to get rid of a rival, the general Wasif al-Turki, by convincing the caliph to send him on a campaign at the Byzantine frontier. He also plotted with the Turkic officers to deprive al-Mu'tazz and al-Mu'ayyad of their rights to succeed al-Muntasir in the event of the latter's death, as they feared that al-Mu'tazz would eradicate them if he became caliph. Al-Muntasir eventually agreed to this and the two brothers were forced to abdicate their position as heirs apparent. He also fearing they would seek revenge for his involvement in the murder of their father. In their place, he was to appoint his son as heir apparent. On 27 April 862, both brothers wrote statements of abdication, although al-Mu'tazz did so after some hesitation.

Al-Muntasir was lauded because, unlike his father, he loved the house of ʻAlī (Shīʻa) and removed the ban on pilgrimage to the tombs of Hassan and Hussayn. He sent Wasif to raid the Byzantines.

=== War with Byzantines ===
Shortly after securing his position as caliph, al-Muntasir decided to send an Abbasid army against the Byzantines. According to al-Tabari, this decision was prompted by Ahmad ibn al-Khasib; the vizier had recently had a falling out with Wasif, and he sought to find an excuse to get him out of the capital. Ahmad ultimately decided that the best way to accomplish this was to put him at the head of a military campaign. He was eventually able to convince the caliph to go along with the plan, and al-Muntasir ordered Wasif to head to the Byzantine frontier.

Having completed their preparations for the campaign, Wasif and the army departed for the Byzantine frontier in early 862. Upon arriving at the Syrian side of the frontier zone, They set up camp there in preparation for their incursions into Byzantine territory.

Before Wasif had a chance to make any serious progress against the Byzantines, however, the campaign was overshadowed by events back at the capital. After a reign of only six months, al-Muntasir died around the beginning of June, of either illness or poison. Following his death, the vizier Ahmad ibn al-Khasib and a small group of senior Turkish commanders met and decided to appoint al-Musta'in as caliph in his stead. They presented their decision to the Samarran military regiments and were eventually able to force the soldiers to swear allegiance to their candidate.

The death of al-Muntasir did not immediately result in the termination of the military campaign. Wasif, upon learning of the passing of the caliph, decided that he should still persist with the operation, and led his forces into Byzantine territory. The army advanced against a Byzantine fortress called Faruriyyah in the region of Tarsus. The defenders of the fortress were defeated and the stronghold was conquered by the Muslims.

Ultimately, however, the change of government in Samarra brought the expedition to a premature conclusion. The ascension of al-Musta'in could not be ignored indefinitely by Wasif; having already missed the opportunity to play a role in the selection of the new caliph, he needed to make sure his interests back in the capital were protected. As a result, he decided to abandon the Byzantine front, and by 863 he was back in Samarra.

== Death ==
Al-Muntasir's reign lasted less than half a year; it ended with his death from unknown causes on Sunday, 7 June 862, at the age of 24 years (solar). There are various accounts of the illness that led to his death, including that he was bled with a poisoned lancet. According to al-Tabari, al-Muntaṣir was the first Abbasid caliph whose tomb became publicly known, attributing this to his mother, a Greek concubine, and that the earlier caliphs preferred secrecy regarding their tombs out of fear of desecration.

However, Joel L. Kraemer notes, citing Ayni (via al-Sibt ibn al-Jawzi), that this statement is surprising, since the tombs of several earlier Abbasid caliphs were in fact known, including al-Saffāḥ at Anbār, al-Mahdī at Masabadhān, Hārūn al-Rashīd at Ṭūs, al-Maʾmūn at Ṭarsūs, and al-Muʿtaṣim, al-Wāthiq, and al-Mutawakkil at Samarra.

== Succession ==
His father, caliph al-Mutawakkil (r. 847–861) had created a plan of succession that would allow his sons to inherit the caliphate after his death; he would be succeeded first by his eldest son, al-Muntasir, then by al-Mu'tazz and third by al-Mu'ayyad. During al-Muntasir's short reign (r. 861–862), the Turks convinced him into removing al-Mu'tazz and al-Mu'ayyad from the succession. When al-Muntasir died, the Turkic officers gathered together and decided to install the dead caliph's cousin Ahmad al-Musta'in on the throne.

Following al-Muntasir's death, Utamish and the officers Bugha al-Kabir and Bugha al-Sharabi met to select a new caliph, eventually deciding on al-Musta'in, a cousin of al-Muntasir. Utamish seems to have held a strong influence on al-Musta'in and became one of the most powerful individuals in the new administration; he was appointed as vizier and given control over the treasury, and additionally received the governorships of Egypt and the Maghrib. The new caliph was almost immediately faced with a large riot in Samarra in support of the disenfranchised al-Mu'tazz; the rioters were put down by the military but casualties on both sides were heavy. Al-Musta'in, worried that al-Mu'tazz or al-Mu'ayyad could press their claims to the caliphate, first attempted to buy them off and then threw them in prison.

== See also ==
- al-Muhtadi, cousin of al-Muntasir
- al-Mu'tamid, brother of al-Muntasir
- al-Muwaffaq, brother of al-Muntasir

== Bibliography ==
- Kennedy, Hugh (2004) [1986]. The Prophet and the Age of the Caliphates: The Islamic Near East from the 6th to the 11th Century (Second ed.). Harlow: Longman. ISBN 978-0-582-40525-7.
- Kennedy, Hugh (2006). When Baghdad Ruled the Muslim World: The Rise and Fall of Islam's Greatest Dynasty. Cambridge, MA: Da Capo Press. ISBN 978-0-306814808.
- Kraemer, Joel L., ed. (1989). The History of al-Ṭabarī, Volume XXXIV: Incipient Decline: The Caliphates of al-Wāthiq, al-Mutawakkil and al-Muntaṣir, A.D. 841–863/A.H. 227–248. SUNY Series in Near Eastern Studies. Albany, New York: State University of New York Press. ISBN 978-0-88706-874-4.
- Gordon, Matthew S. (2001). The Breaking of a Thousand Swords: A History of the Turkish Military of Samarra (A.H. 200–275/815–889 C.E.). Albany, New York: State University of New York Press. ISBN 0-7914-4795-2.
- Masudi (28 October 2013). Meadows Of Gold. Routledge Taylor & Francis. ISBN 978-1-136-14522-3.
- William Muir, The Caliphate: Its Rise, Decline, and Fall.
- Masudi (2010) [1989]. The Meadows of Gold: The Abbasids. Translated by Paul Lunde and Caroline Stone. London and New York: Routledge. ISBN 978-0-7103-0246-5.
- Saliba, George, ed. (1985). The History of al-Ṭabarī, Volume XXXV: The Crisis of the ʿAbbāsid Caliphate: The Caliphates of al-Mustaʿīn and al-Muʿtazz, A.D. 862–869/A.H. 248–255. SUNY Series in Near Eastern Studies. Albany, New York: State University of New York Press. ISBN 978-0-87395-883-7.
- Al-Baladhuri, Ahmad ibn Jabir (1916). The Origins of the Islamic State, Part I. Trans. Philip Khuri Hitti. New York: Columbia University.
- Sourdel, Dominique (1959). Le Vizirat Abbaside de 749 à 936 (132 à 224 de l'Hégire) Vol. I. Damascus: Institut Français de Damas. OCLC 489875099.
- Sourdel, Dominique (1965). "al-D̲j̲ard̲j̲arāʾī". In Lewis, B.; Pellat, Ch. & Schacht, J. (eds.). The Encyclopaedia of Islam, Second Edition. Volume II: C–G. Leiden: E. J. Brill. pp. 461–462. OCLC 495469475.
- Al-Tabari, Abu Ja'far Muhammad ibn Jarir (1985–2007). Ehsan Yar-Shater (ed.). The History of Al-Ṭabarī. Vol. 40 vols. Albany, NY: State University of New York Press.
- Al-Ya'qubi, Ahmad ibn Abu Ya'qub (1883). Houtsma, M. Th. (ed.). Historiae, Vol. 2. Leiden: E. J. Brill.
- Bosworth, C.E. (1993). "Al-Muntasir". In Bosworth, C. E.; van Donzel, E.; Heinrichs, W. P. & Pellat, Ch. (eds.). The Encyclopaedia of Islam, Second Edition. Volume VII: Mif–Naz. Leiden: E. J. Brill. ISBN 978-90-04-09419-2.

al-Muntasir Abbasid dynasty Born: November 837 Died: 7 June 862
Sunni Islam titles
Preceded by al-Mutawakkil	Caliph of the Abbasid Caliphate; 11 December 861 – 7 June 862	Succeeded by al-Musta'in
