= Musa ibn Bugha al-Kabir =

9th-century Abbasid Turkic military leader

- Born: before 819; Abbasid Caliphate
- Died: 877; Samārra, Abbasid Caliphate
- Children: Ahmad, Muhammad, al-Fadl
- Military career
- Allegiance: Abbasid Caliphate
- Branch: Abbasid Turkic regiment
- Service years: c. 862 – 877

Musa ibn Bugha al-Kabir (died 877) was an Abbasid military leader of Turkic origin.

Musa was the son of Bugha al-Kabir, one of the leading Turkish generals under Caliph al-Mu'tasim (r. 833–842). Bugha came into the caliph's service as a slave (ghulam) in 819 or 820 CE, alongside his son, suggesting a birthdate earlier than this. He may have participated in or at least organized the assassination of Caliph al-Mutawakkil in 861. Upon Bugha's death in 862, Musa succeeded his father in his offices and played an important role in the troubles of the "Anarchy at Samarra". Finally, he emerged victorious, and through his close association with the vizier and regent al-Muwaffaq, he became the most powerful general of the Abbasid Caliphate from 870 until his own death in 877. His sons Ahmad, Muhammad and al-Fadl likewise became senior military figures of the Caliphate, especially against the Zanj Rebellion. Musa has also campaigned against Hasan ibn Zayd in Tabaristan between the years of 253/867 to 256/870 in the motive of establishing a dominance over the region.

== Sources ==
- Gordon, Matthew S. (2001). The Breaking of a Thousand Swords: A History of the Turkish Military of Samarra (A.H. 200–275/815–889 C.E.). Albany, New York: State University of New York Press. ISBN 0-7914-4795-2.
- Kennedy, Hugh (2001). The Armies of the Caliphs: Military and Society in the Early Islamic State. London and New York: Routledge. pp. 149ff. ISBN 0-415-25093-5.
