= Bugha al-Sharabi =

Mid-9th century Abbasid Army General

- Native name: Bugha al-Saghir
- Born: Abbasid Caliphate
- Died: c. 868 Samarra, Abbasid Caliphate (now Iraq); Cause of death: Executed
- Allegiance: Abbasid Caliphate
- Branch: Abbasid Turkic regiment
- Service years: c. 850s – 867

Bugha al-Sharabi ("Bugha the Cupbearer"), also known as Bugha al-Saghir ("Bugha the Younger") to distinguish him from his unrelated contemporary Bugha the Elder, was a senior Turkic military leader in the mid-9th century Abbasid Caliphate.

He served under Caliph al-Mutawakkil (r. 847–861) in Azerbaijan, but later led the conspiracy among the Turkic troops who killed the caliph. Closely allied to another Turkic officer, Wasif, Bugha held power at court under the caliphs al-Muntasir (r. 861–862) and al-Musta'in (r. 862–866), during the "Anarchy at Samarra". He fell into disgrace under al-Mu'tazz (r. 866–869), however, who resented both his influence and his role in the murder of al-Mutawakkil, his father. In 868, Bugha was imprisoned and executed at the Caliph's orders.

== Sources ==
- Kraemer, Joel L., ed. (1989). The History of al-Ṭabarī, Volume XXXIV: Incipient Decline: The Caliphates of al-Wāthiq, al-Mutawakkil and al-Muntaṣir, A.D. 841–863/A.H. 227–248. SUNY Series in Near Eastern Studies. Albany, New York: State University of New York Press. ISBN 978-0-88706-874-4.
- Sourdel, D. (1960). "Bughā al-Sharābī". In Gibb, H. A. R.; Kramers, J. H.; Lévi-Provençal, E.; Schacht, J.; Lewis, B. & Pellat, Ch. (eds.). The Encyclopaedia of Islam, Second Edition. Volume I: A–B. Leiden: E. J. Brill. p. 1287. OCLC 495469456.
