= Anarchy at Samarra =

861–870 crisis in the Abbasid Caliphate

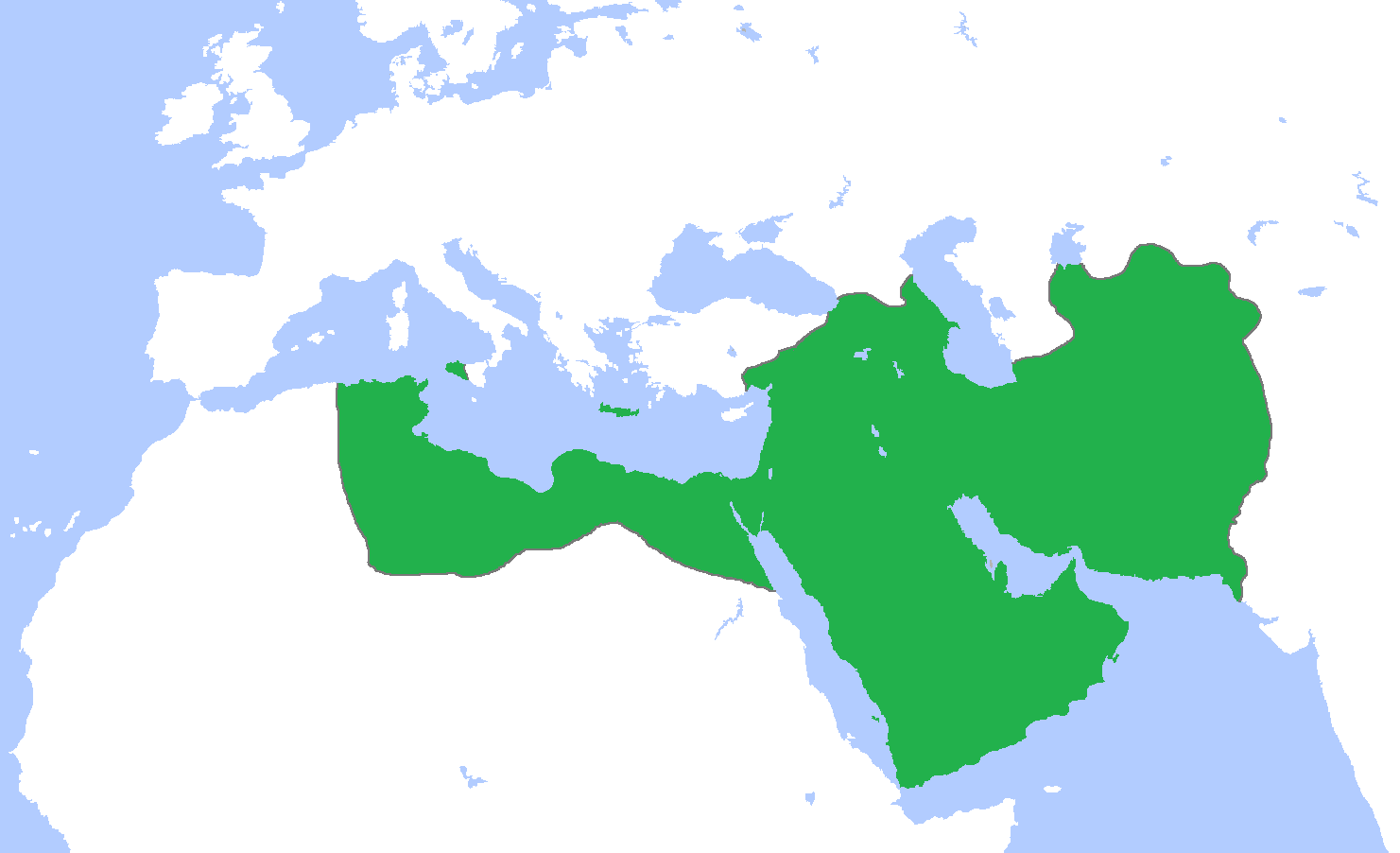
Abbasid Caliphate at the time of al-Mutawakkil's death in c. 861

The Anarchy at Samarra (Arabic: فوضى سامراء, romanized: fawḍā Sāmarrāʾ) was a period of extreme internal instability from 861 to 870 in the history of the Abbasid Caliphate, marked by the violent succession of four caliphs, who became puppets in the hands of powerful rival military groups.

The term derives from the then capital and seat of the caliphal court, Samarra. The "anarchy" began in 861, with the murder of Caliph al-Mutawakkil by his Turkic guards. His successor, al-Muntasir, ruled for six months before his death, possibly poisoned by the Turkic military chiefs. He was succeeded by al-Musta'in. Divisions within the Turkic army leadership enabled Musta'in to flee to Baghdad in 865 with the support of some Turkic chiefs (Bugha the Younger and Wasif) and the Police chief and governor of Baghdad Muhammad, but the rest of the Turkic army chose a new caliph in the person of al-Mu'tazz and besieged Baghdad, forcing the city's capitulation in 866. Musta'in was exiled and executed. Mu'tazz was able and energetic, and he tried to control the military chiefs and exclude the military from the civil administration. His policies were resisted, and in July 869 he too was deposed and killed. His successor, al-Muhtadi, also tried to reaffirm the caliphal authority, but he too was killed in June 870. With Muhtadi's death and the ascension of al-Mu'tamid, the Turkic faction around Musa ibn Bugha, closely associated with Mu'tamid's brother and regent al-Muwaffaq, became dominant in the caliphal court, ending the "anarchy".

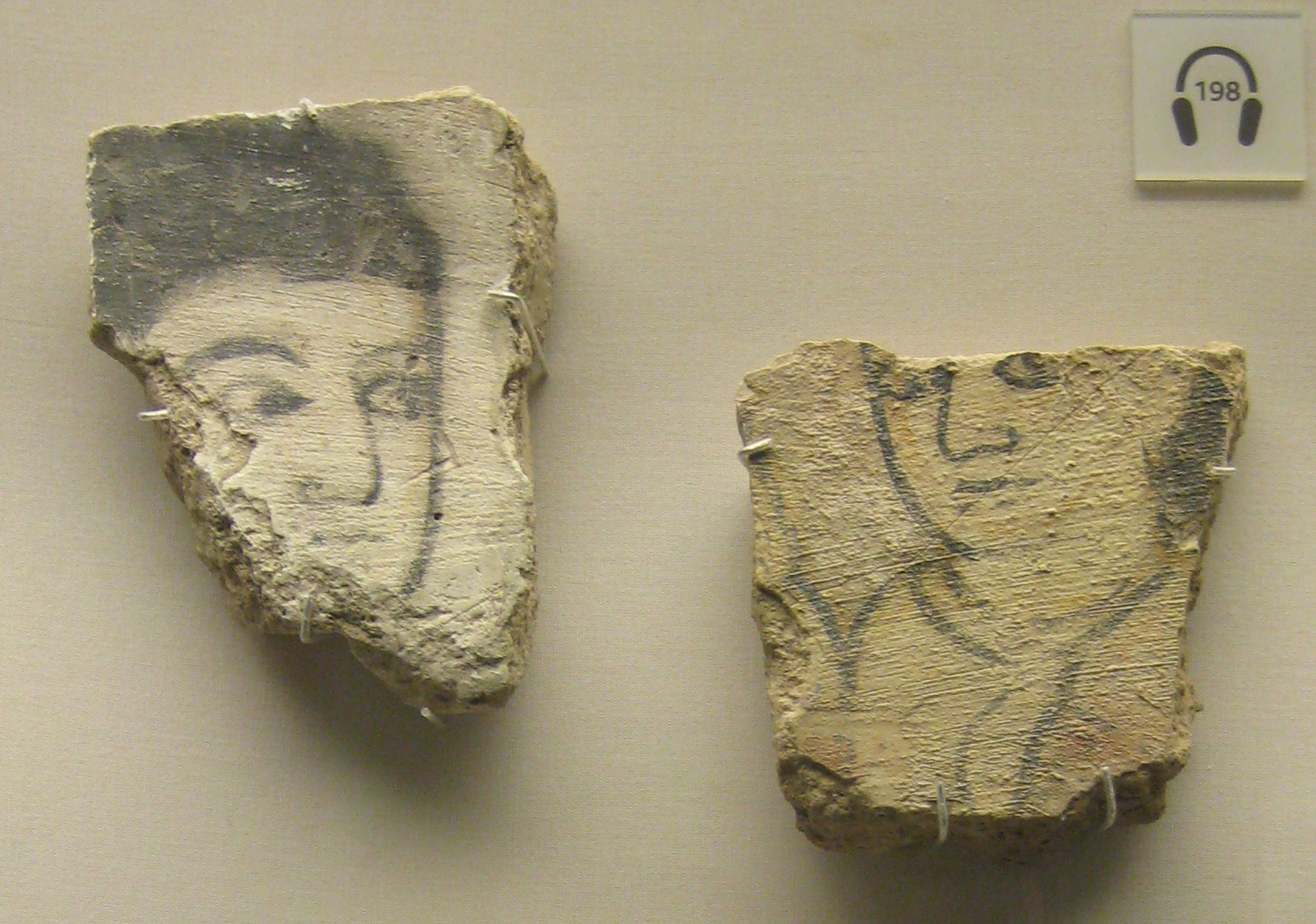
Harem wall painting fragments from 9th-century Samarra

Although the Abbasid Caliphate was able to stage a modest recovery in the following decades, the troubles of the "Anarchy at Samarra" inflicted great and lasting damage on the structures and prestige of the Abbasid central government, encouraging and facilitating secessionist and rebellious tendencies in the caliphal provinces.

Family tree of the Abbasid dynasty in the middle and late 9th century

== Al-Muntasir (861–862) ==
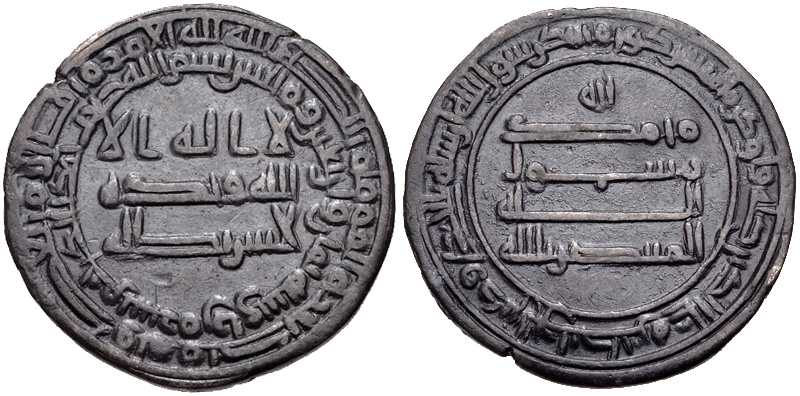
Silver dirham of al-Muntasir

Al-Muntasir became caliph on December 11, 861, after his father al-Mutawakkil was assassinated by members of his Turkic guard. Although he was suspected of being involved in the plot to kill al-Mutawakkil, he was able to quickly take control of affairs in the capital city of Samarra and receive the oath of allegiance from the leading men of the state. Al-Muntasir's sudden elevation to the Caliphate served to benefit several of his close associates, who gained senior positions in the government after his ascension. Included among these were his secretary, Ahmad ibn al-Khasib, who became vizier, and Wasif, a senior Turkic general who had likely been heavily involved in al-Mutawakkil's murder. Al-Muntasir's reign lasted less than half a year; it ended with his death from unknown causes on Sunday 7 June 862, at the age of 24 years (solar). There are various accounts of the illness that led to his death, including that he was bled with a poisoned lancet.

== Al-Musta'in (862–866) ==
After the death of the previous Caliph, al-Muntasir (who had not appointed any successors), the Turkic military leaders held a council to select his successor. They were not willing to have al-Mu'tazz or his brothers; so they elected Ahmad ibn Muhammad, son of the Abbasid prince Muhammad ibn al-Mu'tasim, who took the regnal name al-Mustaʿin. He reigned for four and half years and then abdicated in favor of al-Mu'tazz because of the Abbasid civil war. As part of the terms of al-Musta'in's abdication, he was to be given an estate in the Hijaz and allowed to travel between the cities of Mecca and Medina. On January 12, Muhammad brought a group of judges and jurists to witness that al-Musta'in had entrusted his affairs to him. Delegates carrying the terms of abdication were sent to Samarra, where al-Mu'tazz personally signed the document and agreed to the conditions. The delegates returned to Baghdad with the signed document on January 24, accompanied by a group of emissaries sent to secure al-Musta'in's allegiance to al-Mu'tazz. On Friday, January 25, al-Mu'tazz was acknowledged as caliph in the mosques throughout Baghdad.

Instead of finding refuge at Medina, al-Musta'in found himself kept in Baghdad. There he was put to death on 17 October 866 by the order of al-Mu'tazz. Carrying al-Musta'in's head to the Caliph, "Here," cried the executioner, "behold thy cousin's head!" "Lay it aside," answered al-Mu'tazz who was playing chess, "till I have finished the game." And then, having satisfied himself that it was really al-Musta'in's head, he commanded 500 pieces to be given to the assassin as his reward.

== Al-Mu'tazz (866–869) ==
Originally named as the second in line of three heirs of his father al-Mutawakkil, al-Mu'tazz was forced to renounce his rights after the accession of his brother al-Muntasir and was thrown in prison as a dangerous rival during the reign of his cousin al-Musta'in. He was released and raised to the caliphate in January 866, during the civil war between al-Musta'in and the Turkic military of Samarra. Al-Mu'tazz was determined to reassert the authority of the caliph over the Turkic military but had only limited success. Despite these successes, the Caliph could not overcome the main problem of the period: a shortage of revenue with which to pay the troops. The financial straits of the Caliphate had become evident already at his accession—the customary accession donative of ten months' pay for the troops had to be reduced to two for lack of funds—and had helped bring down the regime of al-Musta'in in Baghdad. The civil war and the ensuing general anarchy only worsened the situation, as revenue stopped coming in even from the environs of Baghdad, let alone more remote provinces. As a result, al-Mu'tazz refused to honor his agreement with Ibn Tahir in Baghdad, leaving him to provide for his own supporters; this led to unrest in Baghdad and the rapid decline of the Governor's authority. The turmoil in Baghdad was worsened by al-Mu'tazz, who in 869 dismissed Ubaydallah and replaced him with his far less capable brother Sulayman. In the event, this only served to deprive the Caliph of a useful counterweight against the Samarra soldiery, and allowed the Turks to regain their former power.

As a result, by 869 the Turkic leaders Salih ibn Wasif (the son of Wasif al-Turki) and Ba'ikbak were again in the ascendant and secured the removal of Ahmad ibn Isra'il. Finally, unable to meet the financial demands of the Turkic troops, in mid-July a palace coup deposed al-Mu'tazz. He was imprisoned and maltreated to such an extent that he died after three days, on 16 July 869. He was succeeded by his cousin al-Muhtadi.

== Al-Muhtadi (869–870) ==
After the deposition and murder of his cousin al-Mu'tazz (r. 866–869) on 15 July 869, the leaders of the Turkic guard chose al-Muhtadi as the new Caliph on 21/22 July. As a ruler, al-Muhtadi sought to emulate the Caliph Umar ibn Abd al-Aziz, widely considered a model Islamic ruler. He therefore lived an austere and pious life—notably removing all musical instruments from the court—and made a point of presiding in person over the courts of grievances (mazalim), thus gaining the support of the common people. Combining "strength and ability", he was determined to restore the Caliph's authority and power, that had been eroded during the ongoing "Anarchy at Samarra" by the squabbles of the Turkic generals. Al-Muhtadi faced Alid risings in the provinces, but the main threat to his power was the Turkic commanders.

When Musa ibn Bugha left to campaign against the Kharijites, al-Muhtadi took the opportunity to incite the people against him and his brother, Muhammad ibn Bugha. Muhammad was brought to trial on accusations of embezzlement and was condemned. Although al-Muhtadi had promised a pardon, Muhammad was executed. This cemented the rift with Musa: the latter marched on the capital with his army and defeated the troops loyal to the Caliph. He refused to abdicate but tried to preserve his life and office by recourse to the religious status of the caliph, and the support of the people. He was nevertheless murdered on 21 June 870, and replaced by his cousin, al-Mu'tamid (r. 870–892).

== Aftermath ==
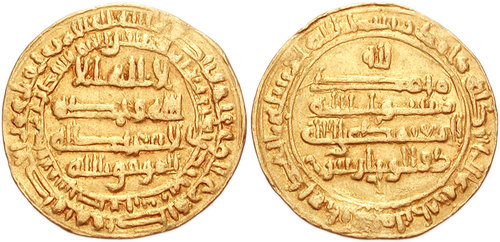
Gold dinar of Caliph al-Mu'tamid (r.870—892), minted in c. 884/5, with the names of Commander in chief al-Muwaffaq and the Vizier Sa'id ibn Makhlad (Dhu'l-Wizaratayn), The Zanj Rebellion was active during al-Mu'tamid's reign from 870s until c. 883

At the end of Anarchy at Samarra, a rebellion broke out famously known as Zanj Rebellion. It grew to involve slaves and freemen, including both Africans and Arabs, from several regions of the Caliphate and claimed tens of thousands of lives before it was finally defeated.

Several Muslim historians, such as al-Tabari and al-Mas'udi, consider the Zanj revolt to be one of the "most vicious and brutal uprisings" of the many disturbances that plagued the Abbasid central government.

== Bibliography ==
- Bonner, Michael (2010). "The waning of empire, 861–945". In Robinson, Chase F. (ed.). The New Cambridge History of Islam, Volume 1: The Formation of the Islamic World, Sixth to Eleventh Centuries. Cambridge: Cambridge University Press. pp. 305–359. ISBN 978-0-521-83823-8.
- Bosworth, C. E. (1993). "al-Muʿtazz Bi'llāh". In Bosworth, C. E.; van Donzel, E.; Heinrichs, W. P. & Pellat, Ch. (eds.). The Encyclopaedia of Islam, Second Edition. Volume VII: Mif–Naz. Leiden: E. J. Brill. pp. 793–794. doi:10.1163/1573-3912_islam_SIM_5668. ISBN 978-90-04-09419-2.
- Bosworth, C.E. (1993). "al-Muntasir". In Bosworth, C. E.; van Donzel, E.; Heinrichs, W. P. & Pellat, Ch. (eds.). The Encyclopaedia of Islam, Second Edition. Volume VII: Mif–Naz. Leiden: E. J. Brill. ISBN 978-90-04-09419-2.
- Cobb, P. M. (2000). "ʿUmar (II) b. ʿAbd al-ʿAzīz". In Bearman, P. J.; Bianquis, Th.; Bosworth, C. E.; van Donzel, E. & Heinrichs, W. P. (eds.). The Encyclopaedia of Islam, Second Edition. Volume X: T–U. Leiden: E. J. Brill. pp. 821–822. ISBN 978-90-04-11211-7.
- Furlonge, Nigel D. (1999). "Revisiting the Zanj and Re-Visioning Revolt: Complexities of the Zanj Conflict – 868–883 AD". Negro History Bulletin. 62 (4): 7–14. Archived from the original on 2015-06-14 – via Questia.
- Gordon, Matthew S. (2001). The Breaking of a Thousand Swords: A History of the Turkish Military of Samarra (A.H. 200–275/815–889 C.E.). Albany, New York: State University of New York Press. ISBN 0-7914-4795-2.
- Kennedy, Hugh N. (2001). The armies of the caliphs: military and society in the early Islamic state. London and New York: Routledge. ISBN 0-415-25093-5.
- Kennedy, Hugh (2004) [1986]. The Prophet and the Age of the Caliphates: The Islamic Near East from the 6th to the 11th Century (Second ed.). Harlow: Longman. ISBN 978-0-582-40525-7.
- Kennedy, Hugh (2006). When Baghdad Ruled the Muslim World: The Rise and Fall of Islam's Greatest Dynasty. Cambridge, MA: Da Capo Press. ISBN 978-0-306814808.
- Saliba, George, ed. (1985). The History of al-Ṭabarī, Volume XXXV: The Crisis of the ʿAbbāsid Caliphate: The Caliphates of al-Mustaʿīn and al-Muʿtazz, A.D. 862–869/A.H. 248–255. SUNY Series in Near Eastern Studies. Albany, New York: State University of New York Press. ISBN 978-0-87395-883-7.
- Zetterstéen, K. V. & Bosworth, C. E. (1993). "al-Muhtadī". In Bosworth, C. E.; van Donzel, E.; Heinrichs, W. P. & Pellat, Ch. (eds.). The Encyclopaedia of Islam, Second Edition. Volume VII: Mif–Naz. Leiden: E. J. Brill. pp. 476–477. doi:10.1163/1573-3912_islam_SIM_5437. ISBN 978-90-04-09419-2.
