= Al-Musta'in =

12th Abbasid caliph (r. 862–866)

al-Musta'in bi-llah المستعين بالله
- Caliph; Commander of the Faithful
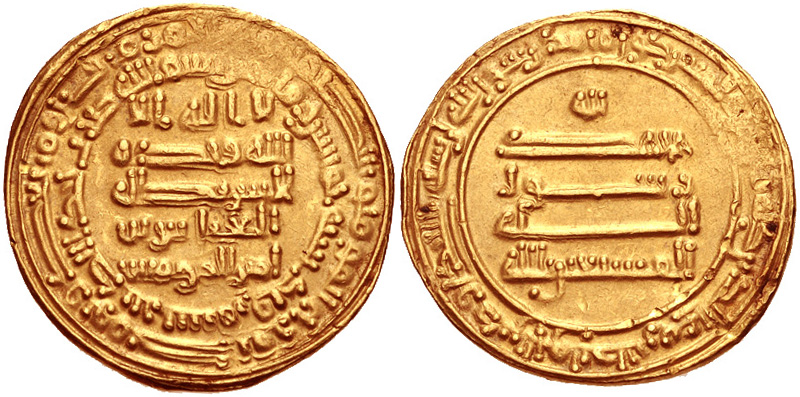
- Gold dinar of al-Musta'in

12th Caliph of the Abbasid Caliphate
- Reign: 8 June 862 – January 866
- Predecessor: al-Muntasir
- Successor: al-Mu'tazz
- Born: c. 836; Samarra, Abbasid Caliphate
- Died: 17 October 866 (aged 29–30); Baghdad, Abbasid Caliphate
- Issue: al-Abbas
Names
- Abū al-ʿAbbās Aḥmad ibn Muḥammad ibn Muḥammad al-Mustaʿīn bi-ʾllāh
- Dynasty: Abbasid
- Father: Muhammad ibn al-Mu'tasim
- Mother: Makhariq
- Religion: Sunni Islam

Abū al-ʿAbbās Aḥmad ibn Muḥammad ibn Muḥammad al-Mustaʿīn bi-ʾllāh (Arabic: أبو العباس أحمد بن محمد بن محمد; 836 – 17 October 866), better known by his regnal title al-Mustaʿīn, was the Abbasid caliph from 862 to 866 during the period known as the "Anarchy at Samarra". Following the death of caliph al-Muntasir, the Turkic military leaders bypassed the claims of al-Mu'tazz and his brothers and selected al-Mustaʿīn, a nephew of al-Mutawakkil, as caliph.

Al-Mustaʿīn's reign was marked by the growing influence of the Turkish military officers in the affairs of the caliphate. His accession provoked unrest in Samarra and opposition from supporters of al-Mu'tazz, while defeats in campaigns in Armenia and Asia Minor and internal rebellions contributed to instability within the caliphate. In 865, conflict between rival military factions led al-Mustaʿīn to flee from Samarra to Baghdad, where he became the center of a civil war with al-Mu'tazz and his supporters.

After a prolonged siege of Baghdad, al-Mustaʿīn agreed to abdicate in favor of al-Mu'tazz in January 866. Although he was promised safe conduct and retirement in the Hijaz, he remained under guard in Baghdad and was executed later that year on the orders of al-Mu'tazz.

== Birth and background ==
Ahmad ibn Muhammad (future al-Musta'in) was the son of Abbasid prince Muhammad ibn al-Mu'tasim and his mother was a concubine from province of Sicily called Makhariq. Al-Musta'in was the grandson of caliph al-Mu'tasim (r. 833–842). He was the nephew of caliph al-Wathiq (r. 842–847) and caliph al-Mutawakkil (r. 847–861).

His uncle, caliph al-Mutawakkil (r. 847–861) had created a plan of succession that would allow his sons to inherit the caliphate after his death; he would be succeeded first by his eldest son, al-Muntasir, then by al-Mu'tazz and third by al-Mu'ayyad. In December 861 al-Mutawakkil was assassinated by a group of Turkic military officers, likely with the support of al-Muntasir. During al-Muntasir's short reign (r. 861–862), the Turks pressured him into removing al-Mu'tazz and al-Mu'ayyad from the succession. When al-Muntasir died, the Turkic officers gathered together and decided to install the dead caliph's cousin al-Musta'in on the throne.

== Reign ==
Family tree of the Abbasid caliphs of the ninth century

Following al-Muntasir's death in June 862, Utamish and the officers Bugha al-Kabir and Bugha al-Sharabi met to select a new caliph, eventually deciding on al-Musta'in, a nephew of al-Mutawakkil. Utamish seems to have held a strong influence on al-Musta'in and became one of the most powerful individuals in the new administration; he was appointed as vizier and given control over the treasury, and additionally received the governorships of Egypt and the Maghrib. Al-Musta'in further entrusted him with the supervision of his son al-Abbas.

The new caliph was almost immediately faced with a large riot in Samarra in support of the disenfranchised al-Mu'tazz; the rioters were put down by the military but casualties on both sides were heavy. Al-Musta'in, worried that al-Mu'tazz or al-Mua'yyad could press their claims to the caliphate, first attempted to buy them off and then threw them in prison.

The governor of Baghdad persuaded the city to submit, and the succession was thereafter acknowledged throughout the land. Al-Mu'tazz and his brother, threatened by the Turkic and Berber troops, resigned their titles to succeed, and were then, by way of protection, kept in confinement. After a second attempt to overturn the decision made by the Turks, al-Mu'tazz and his brother would have been put to death, but the vizier intervened and saved their lives, for which act of mercy, his property was seized by the Turkic soldiers, and himself banished to Crete. The Empire, in fact, both at home and abroad, had passed into the hands of Turks.

Over the course of the first year of al-Musta'in's reign, Utamish enjoyed influence over the caliph and his affairs; in the opinion of the historian Dominique Sourdel, he was "un véritable régent de l'empire." As vizier, he seems to have managed little of the day-to-day administration, leaving his secretary Shuja' ibn al-Qasim to handle it instead. Utamish and Shuja' seem to have initially shared power with Ahmad ibn al-Khasib, until the latter was exiled in July 862.

During his reign, al-Musta'in also married-off Najla, a concubine of his dead uncle Al-Mutawakkil to the Utamish. She was known for her beauty and singing. In 863, the Muslim campaign against the Christians was going badly. Two whole corps in Armenia and Asia Minor, some 8,000 strong, with their leaders, were killed during the Battle of Lalakaon. The tidings created anger and riots in Baghdad. The ancient cry for a Holy War rang through the streets. People blamed the Turks that had brought disaster on the faith, murdered their Caliphs, and set up others at their pleasure.

With such cries the city rose in uproar; the prisons were broken into and bridges burned. But Baghdad could no longer dictate to its rulers; it could only riot. The fighting spirit was, however, strong enough to draw men from the surrounding provinces, who flocked as free lances to fight against the infidel. But the Turks cared for none of these things, nor did the Caliph.

In 864, his forces put down a rebellion by the Alid Yahya ibn Umar and a revolt in Hims.

Utamish's influence over the government soon caused him to make enemies in the army and bureaucracy. He and several other officials stole from the treasury, which caused discontent among the poorly-paid mawlas. Utamish also excluded the influential officers Bugha al-Sharabi and Wasif al-Turki from power, and the two retaliated by plotting his downfall. On June 4, 863, the Turks and Faraghina marched out from their cantonments in Samarra and advanced toward the Jawsaq Palace against Utamish. The vizier attempted to seek refuge with al-Musta'in but was refused; two days later, the troops entered the palace and seized Utamish. He and Shuja' were killed and Utamish's residence was plundered.

In 865, the end for al-Musta'in himself was now at hand. After some disagreements between the Turkish leaders that placed al-Musta'in in much danger, he, along with two other Turkic leaders, Bugha al-Sharabi (known as Bugha al-Saghir) and Wasif al-Turki, left Samarra on a boat to East Baghdad. The Turks sent after him a party of their captains, requesting him to return to Samarra. But the Caliph refused, and hard words followed between the two sides, in the heat of which one of the Turkic speakers received a blow.

The insult rankled the Turkic officers, and on returning to Samarra, the Turkic troops rose together, and bringing forth al-Mu'tazz from his confinement, saluted him as Caliph. Within a few weeks, his brother Abu Ahmad al-Muwaffaq, with 50,000 Turks and 2,000 Berbers, besieged Baghdad, a siege that would last throughout the year 865.

== Abdication in favor of al-Mu'tazz ==
As the siege of Baghdad wore on, it began to have its intended effect. Food and money slowly became scarce, and discontent among the populace began to emerge. As early as August, a group of members of the Abbasid family complained to Muhammad ibn 'Abdallah that their stipends were not being paid. As conditions in the city deteriorated, Muhammad gradually became convinced that victory through force of arms was impossible. By November at the latest, and without the knowledge or permission of al-Musta'in, he had opened negotiations with al-Mu'tazz regarding al-Musta'in's surrender.

Muhammad and al-Mu'tazz had already started negotiating with each other when the former launched his failed sally. After the battle, al-Mu'tazz criticized Muhammad for acting in bad faith, and the Samarran army intensified the siege. Soon the city was running low on resources. Crowds began appearing before Muhammad's palace, crying "hunger!" and demanding a resolution to their problems. Muhammad held off the crowds with promises, and at the same time sent an offer of peace to al-Mu'tazz. This was responded to favorably, and beginning on December 8 a representative from Abu Ahmad's camp began meeting Muhammad in private to discuss how to end the conflict.

As the siege progressed into December, the population of Baghdad became more agitated. On December 16, some of the regular infantry and commoners gathered together, with the former demanding their pay and the latter complaining about how food prices had skyrocketed. Muhammad was able to convince them to temporarily disperse, but riots broke out in the city two days later and it was only with difficulty that they were quelled. Meanwhile, negotiations between Muhammad and Abu Ahmad continued; emissaries were sent by Muhammad to Abu Ahmad's camp, and Samarran prisoners of war were released. Toward the end of December, a provisional agreement between the two sides to depose al-Musta'in was reached, and Abu Ahmad sent five ships loaded with foodstuffs and fodder to relieve the shortages in the city.

When the citizens of Baghdad learned that Muhammad had agreed to depose al-Musta'in, they angrily assembled outside his palace. Out of loyalty to al-Musta'in and fears that Muhammad's surrender could result in the Samarrans plundering the city, they attacked the palace gates and fought against the guards. In order to calm the protestors, al-Musta'in appeared above the palace gate with Muhammad at his side, and he gave assurances to the crowd that he was still caliph and that he would lead the Friday prayers the next morning. The following day, December 28, he failed to appear; in response, the houses of Muhammad's subordinates were looted and a large crowd again approached Muhammad's palace, forcing al-Musta'in to make another public appearance. Shortly after this he moved out of Muhammad's palace to another residence in the city, and on January 2, 866, he led the prayer for the Feast of Sacrifice.

Muhammad, for his part, strove to convince the people that he was still acting in al-Musta'in's best interests, while at the same time continuing to negotiate with Abu Ahmad regarding the terms of surrender. On January 7, Muhammad and Abu Ahmad met in person under a canopy outside the Shammasiyah gate, and the two men agreed that the state revenues would be split among the parties, with two thirds going to the Turks and one third going to Muhammad and the Baghdadi army, and al-Musta'in should be held liable for part of the soldiers' pay. On the following day, Muhammad went to al-Musta'in and attempted to convince him to abdicate. At first al-Musta'in adamantly refused, but when the Turkish officers Wasif and Bugha stated that they had sided with Muhammad, he agreed to step down.

As part of the terms of al-Musta'in's abdication, he was to be given an estate in the Hijaz, and allowed to travel between the cities of Mecca and Medina. On January 12, Muhammad brought a group of judges and jurists to witness that al-Musta'in had entrusted his affairs to him. Delegates carrying the terms of abdication were sent to Samarra, where al-Mu'tazz personally signed the document and agreed to the conditions. The delegates returned to Baghdad with the signed document on January 24, accompanied by a group of emissaries sent to secure al-Musta'in's allegiance to al-Mu'tazz. On Friday, January 25, al-Mu'tazz was acknowledged as caliph in the mosques throughout Baghdad.

== Death ==
By the beginning of 866, with plots and treachery all around, al-Musta'in was persuaded by alternating threats and promises to abdicate in favor of al-Mu'tazz. He was to live at Medina with a sufficient income. The conditions signed, the Governor of Baghdad received the ministers and courtiers of al-Musta'in, and, having assured them he had done what he had for the best and to stop further bloodshed, sent them to Samarra to pay homage to the new Caliph. Al-Mu'tazz ratified the terms and took possession of Baghdad in the early days of 252 AH (866 CE). He also sent to al-Musta'in his mother and family from Samarra, but not until they had been stripped of everything they possessed.

In spite of the terms of abdication, al-Musta'in was not allowed to go into exile to the Hijaz, but was instead moved to Wasit. In October 866 he was ordered to travel to Samarra, but on October 17, when he had arrived in the vicinity of the city, he was intercepted by a group of men sent to kill him and was quickly executed. He was put to death on 17 October 866 by the order of al-Mu'tazz. Carrying al-Musta'in's head to the Caliph, "Here," cried the executioner, "behold thy cousin's head!" "Lay it aside," answered al-Mu'tazz who was playing chess,—"till I have finished the game." And then, having satisfied himself that it was really al-Musta'in's head, he commanded 500 pieces to be given to the assassin as his reward.

== See also ==
- Ja'far ibn Muhammad ibn Ammar al-Burjumi, an Abbasid chief judge of al-Musta'in.
- Fifth Fitna

== Source ==
- Al-Baladhuri, Ahmad ibn Jabir (1916). The Origins of the Islamic State, Part I. Trans. Philip Khuri Hitti. New York: Columbia University.
- Gordon, Matthew S. (2001). The Breaking of a Thousand Swords: A History of the Turkish Military of Samarra (A.H. 200-275/815-889 C.E.). Albany, NY: State University of New York Press. ISBN 0-7914-4795-2.
- Al-Mas'udi, Ali ibn al-Husain (1873). Les Prairies D'Or, Tome Septieme. Ed. and Trans. Charles Barbier de Meynard and Abel Pavet de Courteille. Paris: Imprimerie Nationale.
- Sourdel, Dominique (1959). Le Vizirat Abbaside de 749 à 936 (132 à 224 de l'Hégire) Vol. I. Damascus: Institut Français de Damas. OCLC 489875099.
- al-Ya'qubi, Ahmad ibn Abu Ya'qub (1883). Houtsma, M. Th. (ed.). Historiae, Vol. 2. Leiden: E. J. Brill.
- Zetterstéen, K.V. & Bosworth, C.E. (1993). "Al-Musta'in". In Bosworth, C. E.; van Donzel, E.; Heinrichs, W. P. & Pellat, Ch. (eds.). The Encyclopaedia of Islam, Second Edition. Volume VII: Mif–Naz. Leiden: E. J. Brill. ISBN 978-90-04-09419-2.
- This text is adapted from William Muir's public domain, The Caliphate: Its Rise, Decline, and Fall.
- Bosworth, C.E. (1993). "al-Muntasir". In Bosworth, C. E.; van Donzel, E.; Heinrichs, W. P. & Pellat, Ch. (eds.). The Encyclopaedia of Islam, Second Edition. Volume VII: Mif–Naz. Leiden: E. J. Brill. ISBN 978-90-04-09419-2.
- Bosworth, C.E. (1993). "al-Mu'tazz Bi 'llah". In Bosworth, C. E.; van Donzel, E.; Heinrichs, W. P. & Pellat, Ch. (eds.). The Encyclopaedia of Islam, Second Edition. Volume VII: Mif–Naz. Leiden: E. J. Brill. ISBN 978-90-04-09419-2.
- Saliba, George, ed. (1985). The History of al-Ṭabarī, Volume XXXV: The Crisis of the ʿAbbāsid Caliphate: The Caliphates of al-Mustaʿīn and al-Muʿtazz, A.D. 862–869/A.H. 248–255. SUNY Series in Near Eastern Studies. Albany, New York: State University of New York Press. ISBN 978-0-87395-883-7.

al-Musta'in Abbasid dynasty Born: 836 Died: 866
Sunni Islam titles
Preceded by al-Muntasir	Caliph of the Abbasid Caliphate; 862–866	Succeeded by al-Mu'tazz
