= Al-Fadl ibn al-Rabi =

Abbasid vizier

Al-Fadl ibn al-Rabi (Arabic: الفضل بن الربيع, 757/8–823/4), was one of the most influential officials of the Abbasid Caliphate in the reigns of Harun al-Rashid (r. 786–809) and al-Amin (r. 809–813), whom he served as chamberlain and chief minister. Fadl played an important role as the chief instigator of the civil war that erupted after Harun's death, siding with al-Amin against his half-brother al-Ma'mun (r. 813–833). After al-Ma'mun's victory he went into hiding, but eventually reconciled himself with the new ruler.

== Biography ==
=== Career under Harun al-Rashid ===
Born in AH 138 (757/8 CE), Fadl was the son of al-Rabi ibn Yunus. Rabi was a former slave who had risen to occupy the influential post of chamberlain (hajib) under caliphs al-Mansur (r. 754–775) and al-Mahdi (r. 775–785). Rabi's power relied on his control of the access of outsiders to the Caliph, as well as his de facto leadership of the Caliph's numerous and influential mawla (servants, freedmen). Fadl effectively inherited his father's position at court, and benefited from the high esteem in which Harun al-Rashid held him: upon his accession, the Caliph placed Fadl in charge of his personal seal, and in 789/90 he was made head of the diwan al-Nafaqat (the "Bureau of Expenditure"). In 795/6 he was named to his father's old post of hajib, reportedly after succeeding in finding the poet Ibn Jami, who had been exiled under al-Hadi (r. 785–786).

Utterly loyal to his master, Fadl served as Harun's trusted agent. In the words of Hugh N. Kennedy, "If Hārūn wanted to have someone brought to him secretly or to organize a test for someone he suspected of disloyalty, Fadl could be relied on to carry this out." Anecdotes from the court also serve to emphasize his "hard-headed, practical and somewhat unimaginative" (Kennedy) character, in stark contrast to the cultured Barmakids, who until their sudden disgrace in 803 dominated the Abbasid court and government. Despite his apparently good personal relations to the Barmakid patriarch Yahya ibn Khalid, stories portray Fadl as the Barmakids' chief rival at court. Following the fall of the Barmakid family from power, Fadl succeeded Yahya as vizier, in effect becoming the Caliph's chief minister and advisor. However, Fadl lacked the almost plenipotentiary powers that Harun had granted Yahya, and his remit was limited to a supervisory role over expenditure and in the handling of petitions, correspondence and execution of orders to the Caliph, while the actual financial administration was entrusted to another official.

In 808, Fadl accompanied Harun in his expedition to Khurasan to suppress the revolt of Rafi ibn al-Layth, and was with him when he died at Tus in March 809. There Fadl had the army pledge allegiance (bay'ah) to Harun's heir al-Amin, who had remained behind in Baghdad. Amin, who had need of Fadl's experience, sent letters to him urging him to return to the capital, and to bring with him the treasury, which Harun had taken along, as well as the entire expeditionary army assembled to crush the rebellion. Harun's second heir, al-Ma'mun, who was tasked with the governance of Khurasan, regarded the withdrawal of the entire army as a betrayal, and vainly tried to dissuade Fadl from this move.

=== Career under al-Amin and role in the civil war ===
Back in Baghdad, Fadl remained Amin's leading advisor, but his role in the governance of the state seems to have been limited. Nevertheless, he was the leading figure among those in the Abbasid establishment who pressured Amin into reversing his father's succession plans, removing Ma'mun from his place in the succession in favor of Amin's son Musa, and also as governor of Khurasan. This policy increased the already existing polarization of the Abbasid elites between the two princes, with the Khurasani nobility, headed by Ma'mun's vizier, al-Fadl ibn Sahl, flocking to Ma'mun, whom they saw as the champion of their interests against the central government in Baghdad. The breach between the two sides was complete in November 810, when Amin dropped Ma'mun's name from the Friday prayer. This led to a chain of mutual acts that resulted in the outbreak of open civil war (the "Fourth Fitna") between the two brothers. After Ma'mun's forces scored an unexpected victory over the caliphal army at the Battle of Ray, the situation became critical in Baghdad, where many began to accuse Amin of idleness and complacency and Fadl of inefficient leadership. As Ma'mun's general Tahir ibn Husayn advanced through Iran, Fadl tried to reinforce the Baghdad troops (the abna al-dawla) with levies from the Arab tribes of Syria and the Jazira, but they soon fell out with the abna′, who were jealous of their pay and privileges, so that this project came to nothing. Seeing Amin's cause as lost, and with Ma'mun's troops approaching the capital, Fadl went into hiding.

Baghdad fell to Ma'mun's forces in September 813, after a brutal year-long siege, and Amin was executed. Ma'mun however remained in Khurasan and made no move to come to Baghdad, entrusting the governance of the Caliphate to Fadl ibn Sahl and his Khurasani friends. This provoked great resentment in Iraq, and when Ma'mun chose an Alid, Ali al-Ridha, as his heir, the old Abbasid elites of Baghdad rose up in 817 and raised Ibrahim ibn al-Mahdi as caliph in the place of Ma'mun. However, when Ma'mun finally began to advance on Baghdad, Ibrahim's support collapsed. Fadl re-emerged briefly from hiding during this time in support of Ibrahim, but when Ma'mun entered the capital in 819, he secured his pardon. During his last years, Fadl even enjoyed a return to the Caliph's favour due to his long experience and loyal service to the Abbasid house. He died in Baghdad in the spring of 823 or 824.

== Assessment and legacy ==
Despite his long and loyal service to the Abbasids, Fadl's assessment by modern historians is negative, as he is considered the main instigator of the civil war through his machinations to remove Ma'mun from the succession. Thus Dominique Sourdel calls him "an intriguer of mediocre personality and limited ability" who tried to use Amin's weak character for his own advantage, while Kennedy sees in him the "evil genius" responsible for the destructive civil war.

The Persian Juvayni family from the 13th century claimed to have Fadl as a common ancestor.

== Sources ==
- Biran, Michal (2009). "JOVAYNI, ṢĀḤEB DIVĀN". In Yarshater, Ehsan (ed.). Encyclopædia Iranica. Vol. XV/1: Joči–Judeopersian communities of Iran V. Qajar period (1786-1925). London and New York: Routledge & Kegan Paul. pp. 71–74. ISBN 978-1-934283-14-1.
- Kennedy, Hugh (2006). When Baghdad Ruled the Muslim World: The Rise and Fall of Islam's Greatest Dynasty. Cambridge, MA: Da Capo Press. ISBN 978-0-306814808.
- Sourdel, Dominique (1965). "al-Faḍl b. al-Rabīʿ". In Lewis, B.; Pellat, Ch. & Schacht, J. (eds.). The Encyclopaedia of Islam, Second Edition. Volume II: C–G. Leiden: E. J. Brill. pp. 730–731. OCLC 495469475.
