= Fourth Fitna =

Abbasid-era Muslim civil war (811–819)

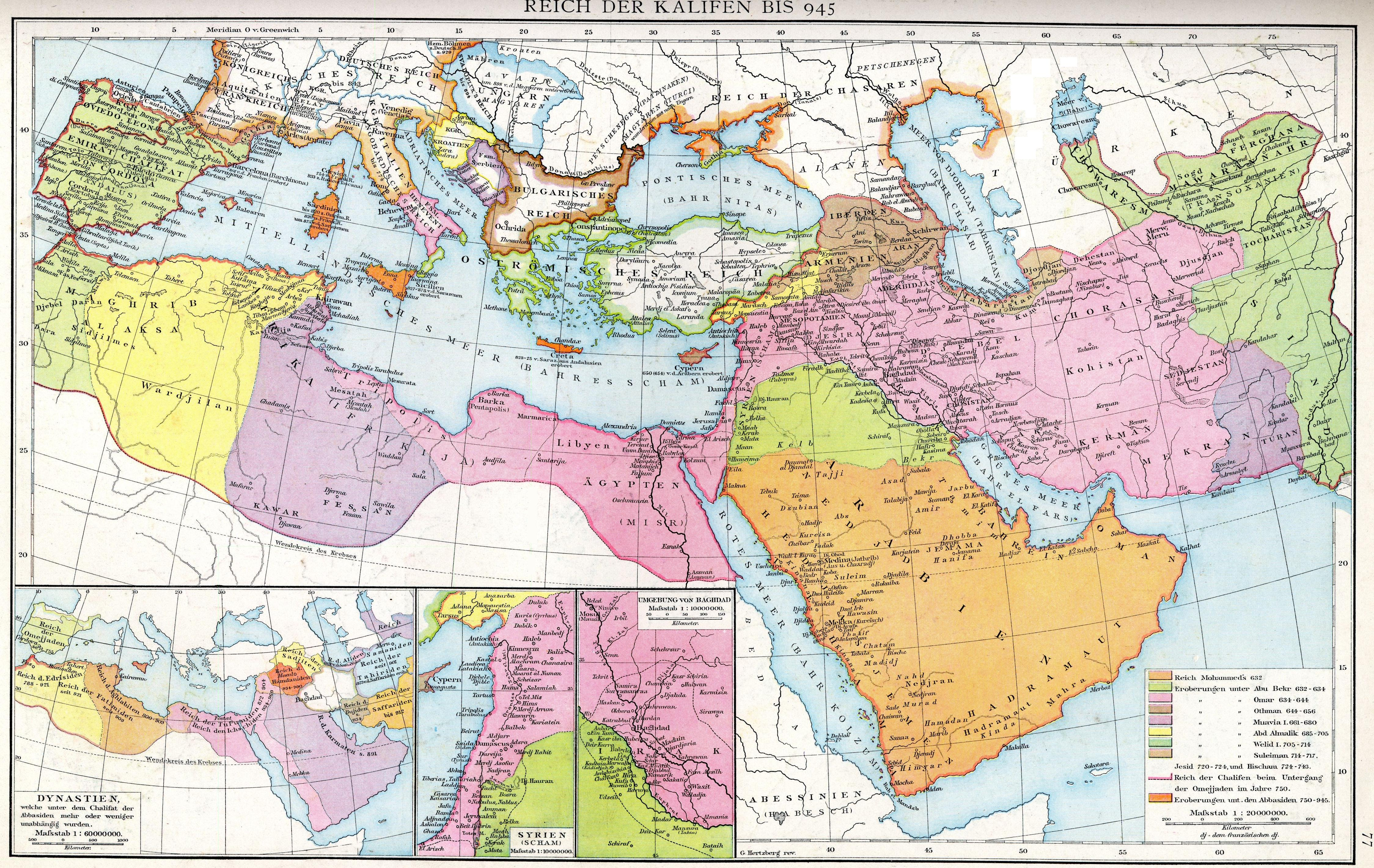
- Map of the Muslim expansion and the Muslim world under the Umayyad and early Abbasid caliphates
Date	811–813/837
Location	Abbasid Caliphate territories (modern day Iran, Iraq, Syria and Egypt)
Result	Victory of al-Ma'mun

Belligerents
al-Amin's forces	al-Ma'mun's forces	Local rulers & rebel leaders

Commanders and leaders
al-Amin †; Ali ibn Isa †; Abd al-Rahman ibn Jabala †; Muhammad al-Muhallabi †	al-Ma'mun; Tahir ibn Husayn; Harthama ibn A'yan; Abdallah ibn Tahir; al-Hasan ibn Sahl; al-Fadl ibn Sahl	Ubaydallah ibn al-Sari; Nasr al-Uqayli; Babak Khorramdin; Abu'l-Saraya (executed); Muhammad ibn Ja'far al-Sadiq (surrendered); Ibrahim ibn Musa al-Kazim; Abu al-Umaytir al-Sufyani

The Fourth Fitna, Fourth Muslim Civil War, or Great Abbasid Civil War resulted from the conflict between the brothers al-Amin and al-Ma'mun over the succession to the throne of the Abbasid Caliphate. Their father, Caliph Harun al-Rashid, had named al-Amin as the first successor, but had also named al-Ma'mun as the second, with Khorasan granted to him as an appanage. Later a third son, al-Qasim, was designated as third successor. After Harun died in 809, al-Amin succeeded him in Baghdad. Encouraged by the Baghdad court, al-Amin began trying to subvert the autonomous status of Khurasan, and al-Qasim was quickly sidelined. In response, al-Ma'mun sought the support of the provincial élites of Khurasan and made moves to assert his own autonomy. As the rift between the two brothers and their respective camps widened, al-Amin declared his own son Musa as his heir and assembled a large army. In 811, al-Amin's troops marched against Khurasan, but al-Ma'mun's general Tahir ibn Husayn defeated them in the Battle of Ray, and then invaded Iraq and besieged Baghdad itself. The city fell after a year, al-Amin was executed, and al-Ma'mun became Caliph.

Al-Ma'mun chose to remain in Khorasan, however, rather than coming to the capital. This allowed the power vacuum which the civil war had fostered in the Caliphate's provinces to grow, and several local rulers sprang up in Jazira, Syria and Egypt. In addition, a series of Alid uprisings occurred, beginning with Abu'l-Saraya at Kufa and spreading to southern Iraq, the Hejaz, and Yemen. The pro-Khorasani policies followed by al-Ma'mun's powerful chief minister, al-Fadl ibn Sahl, and al-Ma'mun's eventual espousal of an Alid succession in the person of Ali al-Ridha, alienated the traditional Baghdad élites, who saw themselves increasingly marginalized. Consequently, al-Ma'mun's uncle Ibrahim was proclaimed rival caliph at Baghdad in 817, forcing al-Ma'mun to intervene in person. Fadl ibn Sahl was assassinated and al-Ma'mun left Khorasan for Baghdad, which he entered in 819. The next years saw the consolidation of al-Ma'mun's authority and the re-incorporation of the western provinces against local rebels, a process not completed until the pacification of Egypt in 827. Some local rebellions, notably that of the Khurramites, dragged on for far longer, into the 830s.

Historians have interpreted the conflict variously; in the words of the Iranologist Elton L. Daniel, it has been regarded as "a conflict over the succession between a rather incompetent, besotted al-Amin and his shrewdly competent brother al-Ma'mun; as the product of harem intrigues; as an extension of the personal rivalry between the ministers al-Fadl b. Rabi and al-Fadl b. Sahl; or as a struggle between Arabs and Persians for the control of the government".

== Background ==
The origins of the civil war lie in the succession arrangements of Harun al-Rashid (r. 786–809) as well as the internal political dynamics of the Abbasid Caliphate. The two main contenders, Muhammad al-Amin and Abdallah al-Ma'mun, were born six months apart in AH 170 (786/7) with al-Ma'mun being the elder. It was al-Amin however who was named first heir in 792, while al-Ma'mun followed in 799, a sequence which was influenced by their lines of descent and their political implications: al-Amin had a solidly Abbasid lineage, being Harun's son by Zubayda, herself descended from the second Abbasid Caliph al-Mansur (r. 754–775), while al-Ma'mun's mother was Marajil, a Persian concubine from Badhgis in Khurasan.

While al-Ma'mun's origin was less prestigious than the purely Arab al-Amin, his ties to Khurasan and the Iranian-dominated eastern provinces were an important factor in his choice as heir. In contrast to the exclusively Arab-ruled Umayyad Caliphate, the Abbasid state was under heavy Iranian, and particularly Khurasani, influence. The Abbasid Revolution, which brought the Abbasids to power, originated in Khurasan, and the Abbasid dynasty relied heavily on Khurasanis as military leaders and administrators. Many of the original Khurasani Arab army (Khurasaniyya) that came west with the Abbasids were given estates in Iraq and the new Abbasid capital, Baghdad, and became an elite group known as the abnaʾ al-dawla ("sons of the state/dynasty"). Khurasan retained a privileged position among the Caliphate's provinces, and Harun al-Rashid, in particular, was careful to cultivate his ties with the Iranian element of the Caliphate, not least through his promotion of the Khurasani Barmakid family to positions of power. Both al-Amin and al-Ma'mun had been tutored in their youth by the Barmakids, al-Amin by al-Fadl ibn Yahya and al-Ma'mun by Ja'far ibn Yahya. While al-Amin would distance himself from the Barmakids and become closely associated with the abnaʾ aristocracy of Baghdad, al-Ma'mun remained influenced by Ja'far and his associates.

In 802, Harun and the most powerful officials of the Abbasid government made the pilgrimage to Mecca, where the definitive succession arrangement was drawn up: al-Amin would succeed Harun in Baghdad, but al-Ma'mun would remain al-Amin's heir and would additionally rule over an enlarged and practically independent Khurasan. A third son, al-Qasim (al-Mu'tamin), was also added as third heir and received responsibility over the frontier areas with the Byzantine Empire. The stipulations of the agreement, extensively recorded by the historian al-Tabari, may however have been distorted by later apologists of al-Ma'mun, especially as regards the extent of the autonomy granted to al-Ma'mun's eastern viceroyalty.

Almost immediately after it returned to Baghdad, in January 803, the Abbasid court witnessed the abrupt fall of the Barmakid family from power. On the one hand, this decision may reflect the fact that the Barmakids may have become indeed too powerful for the Caliph's liking, but its timing suggests that it was tied to the succession issue as well: with al-Amin siding with the abnaʾ and al-Ma'mun with the Barmakids, and the two camps becoming more estranged every day, if al-Amin was to have a chance to succeed, the power of the Barmakids had to be broken. Indeed, the years after the fall of the Barmakids saw an increasing centralization of the administration and the concomitant rise of the influence of the abnaʾ, many of whom were now dispatched to take up positions as provincial governors and bring these provinces under closer control from Baghdad.

This led to unrest in the provinces, especially Khurasan, where, according to Elton L. Daniel, "Abbasid policies [fluctuated] between two extremes. One governor would attempt to extract as much wealth as he could from the province for the benefit of Iraq, the central government, and, not infrequently, himself. When the people protested loudly enough, such governors would be temporarily replaced by ones who would attend to local interests". The Khurasani elites had a long-standing rivalry with the abnaʾ. Although the latter now resided chiefly in what is now Iraq, they insisted on retaining control of Khurasani affairs and demanded that the province's revenues be sent west to supply their salaries, something strongly resisted by the local Arab and Iranian elites. The resulting tension was eased when al-Fadl ibn Yahya, universally praised as a model governor, was appointed to Khurasan in 793, but was re-fanned in 796, when a member of the abnaʾ, Ali ibn Isa ibn Mahan, was placed in charge of the province. His harsh taxation measures provoked increasing unrest, which expressed itself in Kharijite uprisings and, finally, a rebellion by the governor of Samarkand, Rafi ibn al-Layth. This uprising forced Harun himself, accompanied by al-Ma'mun and the powerful chamberlain (hajib) and chief minister al-Fadl ibn al-Rabi, to travel to the province in 808. Al-Ma'mun was sent ahead with part of the army to Marv, while Harun stayed at Tus, where he died on 24 March 809.

== Civil war between al-Amin and al-Ma'mun, 809–813 ==
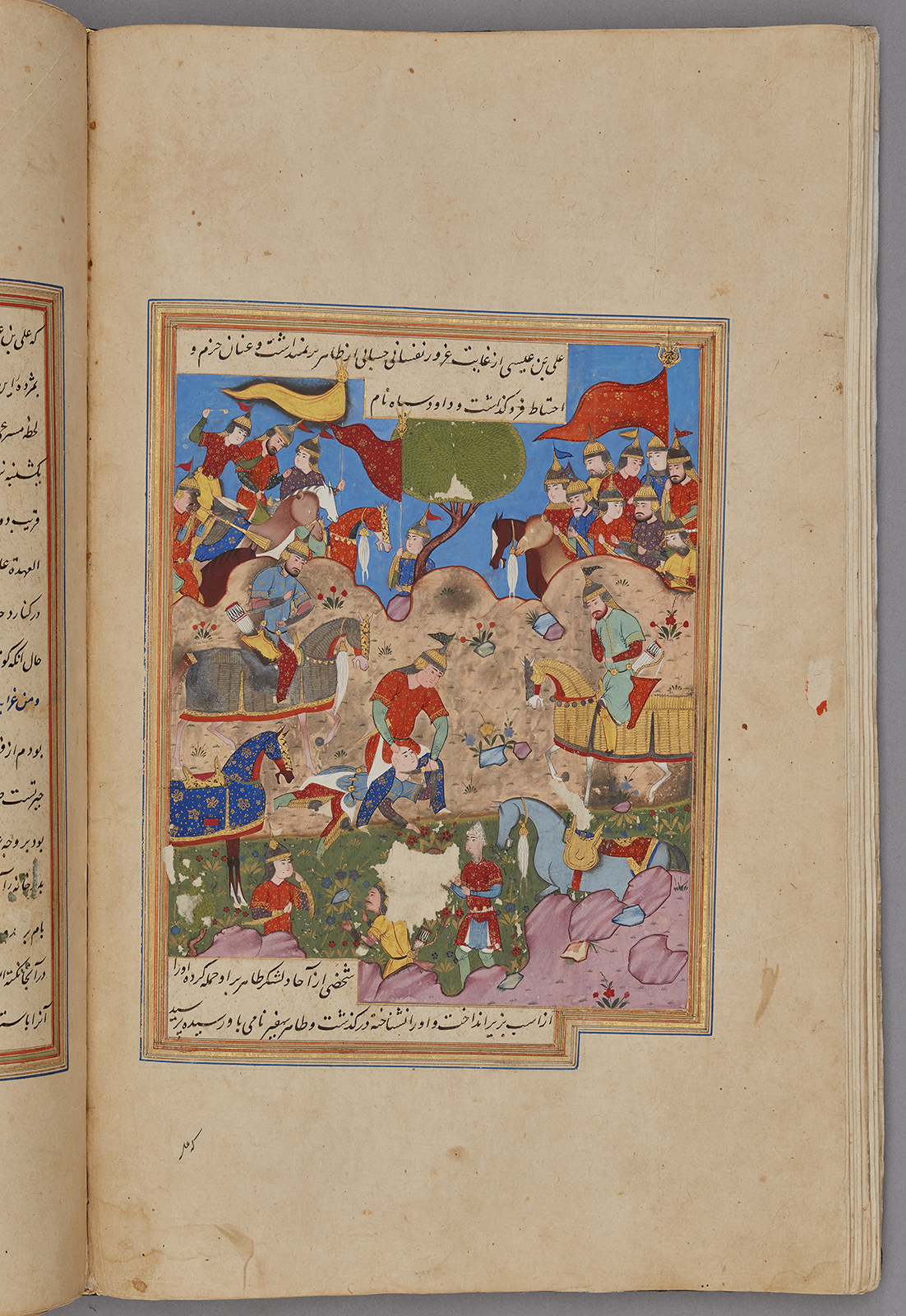
"The victory of Maʿmun over Amin". Folio from a manuscript of Nigaristan, Iran, probably Shiraz, dated 1573–74.

Upon Harun's death, al-Amin ascended the throne in Baghdad, where his popularity was great, while al-Ma'mun remained at Marv, from where he planned to campaign against the remaining rebels. However, al-Amin recalled the army and treasury from the east, leaving al-Ma'mun with little in the way of military forces. It was in this time that al-Ma'mun came to rely upon his wazir, the former Barmakid protégé al-Fadl ibn Sahl, who began to implement a policy of conciliation and cooperation with the local elites, whose autonomy and privileges were guaranteed. The covenant of 802 however soon began to fall apart over Baghdad's centralizing ambitions and the dispute over the status of Khurasan: the abnaʾ, led by Ali ibn Isa, whom Harun had imprisoned but who was now set free and appointed head of the Caliph's bodyguard, were joined by other influential officials, chief amongst them al-Fadl ibn al-Rabi, in demanding that Khurasan and its revenue return to the direct control of the central government, even if that meant breaking the stipulations of the Mecca agreement.

Some modern scholars have tried to interpret the conflict between the two brothers as a confrontation between the Arab and Iranian elements of the caliphate, represented by the two contenders' mothers. It is true that the Iranian-dominated East generally backed al-Ma'mun, but neither was al-Amin a conscious champion of "Arabism", nor was the support for al-Ma'mun the result of his Iranian origin, although his supporters did make propaganda among the local population for the "son of their sister". Al-Ma'mun enjoyed the support of the local elites of Khurasan mainly because they saw in him a champion of their newly won autonomy, and because he himself assiduously cultivated that support. Later, during the war, the prospect of his victory also offered the Khurasanis the promise of a yet more privileged position in the new regime. However, the conflict was first and foremost a dynastic dispute, with al-Amin attempting to institute a direct patrilineal succession. In this he did nothing but follow the footsteps of his predecessors since al-Mansur, all of whom struggled against the claims of brothers or cousins. Harun al-Rashid himself was imprisoned during the brief reign of his elder brother al-Hadi (r. 785–786). Given to indolence and lacking any political ability himself, al-Amin entrusted this project to al-Fadl ibn al-Rabi, who is generally portrayed as the "evil genius" behind al-Amin, and one of the main instigators of the conflict. Very quickly, al-Amin moved to sideline the youngest brother, Qasim. Initially, Qasim was removed from his governorship of the Jazira, but soon after he was stripped altogether of his place in the succession and placed under guard at Baghdad. It was only because al-Ma'mun resided far from the Caliph's immediate area of control that he escaped sharing this fate.

The rift between the two camps manifested in 810, when al-Amin added his own son, Musa, to the line of succession. Al-Amin then sent a delegation to Marv, asking al-Ma'mun to return to Baghdad. After al-Ma'mun, fearing for his safety, refused, al-Amin began to interfere with his brother's domain: he protested al-Ma'mun's pardon to Ibn al-Layth after his surrender and asked for tribute from the governors of the western provinces of Khurasan as a sign of submission. He then demanded of his brother the cession of the western regions of Khurasan, the admission of caliphal tax and postal agents into the province, and the forwarding of Khurasan's revenue to Baghdad. Al-Ma'mun, who could not rely on large military forces and whose position was consequently weak, was at first inclined to accede to his brother's demands, but al-Fadl ibn Sahl dissuaded him from this course and encouraged him to seek support among the native population of Khurasan, who also opposed control by the caliphal court.

Al-Ma'mun, who was already favourably regarded after the excesses of Ali ibn Isa, consciously set about to cultivate the support of the local population, reducing taxes, dispensing justice in person, conceding privileges to the native princes, and demonstratively evoking episodes from the beginnings of the Abbasid movement in the province. He now became a "political magnet for Iranian sympathisers" (El-Hibri) refused to cede his province or return to Baghdad, and began to gather around him those dissatisfied with Baghdad's centralizing policies or who had simply been left out of the share of spoils and power after the Abbasid Revolution.

Under the influence of their respective chief ministers, al-Amin and al-Ma'mun took steps that further polarized the political climate and made the breach irreparable. After al-Ma'mun symbolically removed al-Amin's name from his coins and from the Friday prayer, in November 810 al-Amin removed al-Ma'mun and al-Mu'tamin from the succession and nominated his own sons Musa and Abdallah instead. Al-Ma'mun replied by declaring himself imam, a religious title which shied of directly challenging the Caliph but nevertheless implied independent authority, as well as hearkening back to the early days of the Hashimiyya movement which had carried the Abbasids to power.

Despite the reservations of some of his senior ministers and governors, two months later, in January 811, al-Amin formally began the civil war when he appointed Ali ibn Isa governor of Khurasan, placed him at the head of an unusually large army of 40,000 men, drawn from the abnaʾ, and sent him to depose al-Ma'mun. When Ali ibn Isa set out for Khurasan, he reportedly took along a set of silver chains with which to bind al-Ma'mun and carry him back to Baghdad. The news of Ali's approach threw Khurasan into panic, and even al-Ma'mun considered fleeing. The only military force available to him was a small army of some 4,000–5,000 men, under Tahir ibn al-Husayn. Tahir was sent to confront Ali's advance, but it was widely regarded as almost a suicide mission, even by Tahir's own father. The two armies met at Rayy, on the western borders of Khurasan, and the ensuing battle on 3 July 811 resulted in a crushing victory for the Khurasanis, in which Ali was killed and his army disintegrated on its flight west.

Tahir's unexpected victory was decisive: al-Ma'mun's position was secured, while his main opponents, the abnaʾ, lost men, prestige and their most dynamic leader. Tahir now advanced westwards, defeated another abnaʾ army of 20,000 under Abd al-Rahman ibn Jabala after a series of hard-fought engagements near Hamadan, and reached Hulwan by winter. Al-Amin now desperately tried to bolster his forces by alliances with Arab tribes, notably the Banu Shayban of Jazira and the Qays of Syria. The veteran Abd al-Malik ibn Salih was sent to Syria to mobilize its troops along with Ali ibn Isa's son, Husayn. However, al-Amin's efforts failed due to the long-standing intertribal divisions between the Qays and the Kalb, the Syrians' reluctance to get involved in the civil war, as well as the unwillingness of the abnaʾ to cooperate with the Arab tribes and to make political concessions to them. These failed efforts to secure Arab tribal support backfired on al-Amin, as the abnaʾ began to doubt whether their interests were best served by him. In March 812, Husayn ibn Ali led a short-lived coup against al-Amin in Baghdad, proclaiming al-Ma'mun as the rightful Caliph, until a counter-coup, led by other factions within the abnaʾ, restored al-Amin to the throne. Fadl ibn al-Rabi, however, one of the main instigators of the war, concluded that al-Amin's case was lost and resigned from his court offices. At about the same time, al-Ma'mun was officially proclaimed caliph, while Fadl ibn Sahl acquired the unique title of Dhu 'l-Ri'asatayn ("he of the two headships"), signifying his control over both civil and military administration.

Map of Iraq and surrounding regions in the early ninth century

In spring 812, Tahir, reinforced with more troops under Harthama ibn A'yan, resumed his offensive. He invaded Khuzistan, where he defeated and killed the Muhallabid governor Muhammad ibn Yazid, whereupon the Muhallabids of Basra surrendered to him. Tahir also took Kufa and al-Mada'in, advancing on Baghdad from the west while Harthama closed in from the east. At the same time, al-Amin's authority crumbled as supporters of al-Ma'mun took control of Mosul, Egypt and the Hejaz, while most of Syria, Armenia and Adharbayjan fell under the control of local Arab tribal leaders. As Tahir's army closed on Baghdad, the rift between al-Amin and the abnaʾ was solidified when the desperate Caliph turned to the common people of the city for help and gave them arms. The abnaʾ began defecting to Tahir in droves, and in August 812, when Tahir's army appeared before the city, he established his quarters in the suburb of Harbiyya, traditionally an abnaʾ stronghold.

The historian Hugh N. Kennedy characterized the subsequent siege of the city as "an episode almost without parallel in the history of early Islamic society" and "the nearest early Islamic history saw to an attempt at social revolution", as Baghdad's urban proletariat defended their city for over a year in a vicious urban guerrilla war. Indeed, it was this "revolutionary" situation in the city as much as famine and the besiegers' professional expertise, that brought about its fall: in September 813, Tahir convinced some of the richer citizens to cut the pontoon bridges over the Tigris that connected the city to the outside world, allowing al-Ma'mun's men to occupy the city's eastern suburbs. Al-Ma'mun's troops then launched a final assault, in which al-Amin was captured and executed at Tahir's orders while trying to seek refuge with his old family friend Harthama. While al-Ma'mun was probably not implicated in the act, it was politically convenient, as it left him both de jure and de facto the legitimate caliph.

== Sahlid dominance and reaction, 813–819 ==
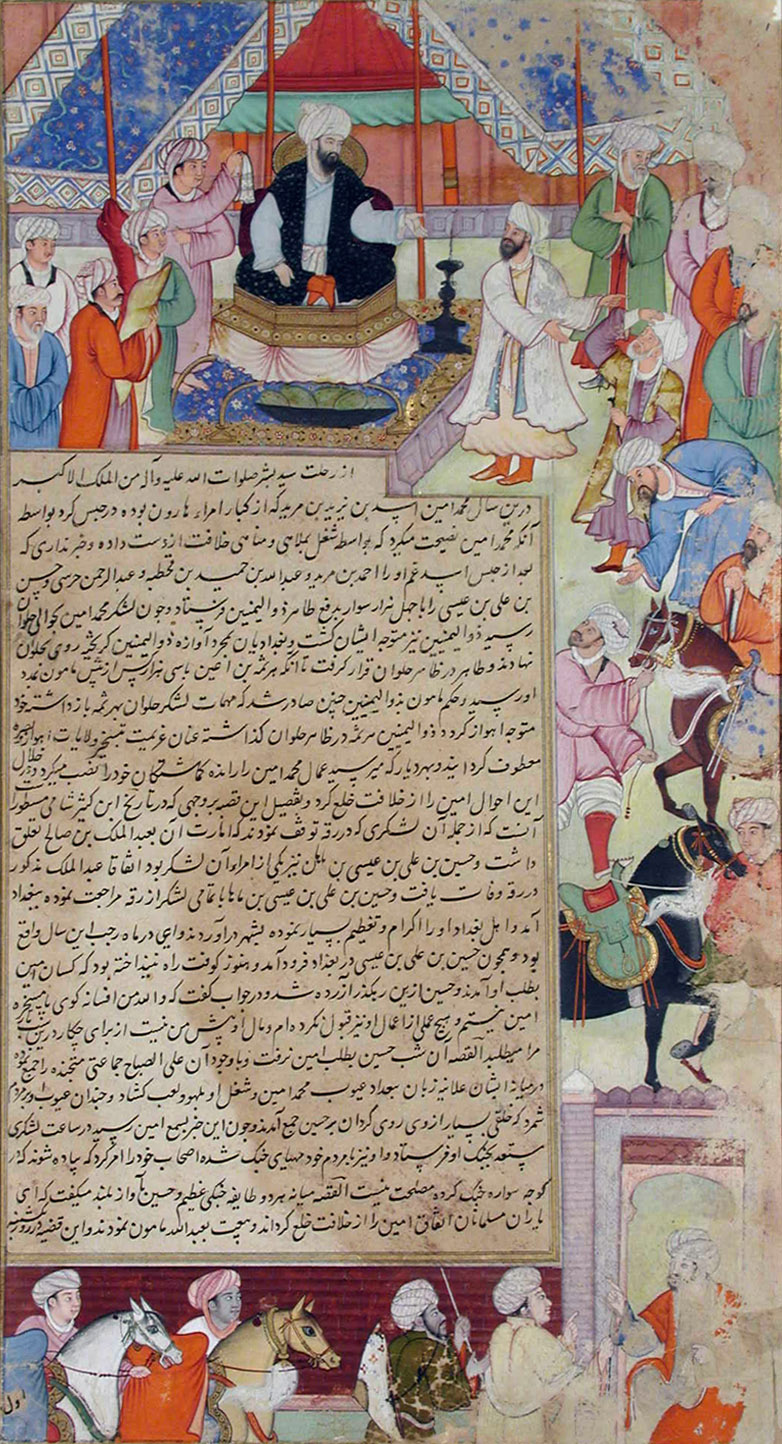
The populace pays Allegiance to the Abbasid caliph, Al-Ma'mun in 813. (from the book Tarikh-i Alfi 1593 CE)

Nevertheless, the regicide soured al-Ma'mun's victory. Tahir was soon transferred out of the public eye to an unimportant post in Raqqa, but his deed lastingly tarnished the prestige and image of the Abbasid dynasty. According to Elton Daniel, "It shattered the sacrosanct aura which had surrounded the person of the Abbasid caliphs; For the first time, an Abbasid ruler had been humiliated and put to death by rebellious subjects". As al-Ma'mun remained in Marv and made no signs of returning to the caliphal capital, a wave of Arab antipathy towards al-Ma'mun and his "Persian" supporters came to the fore in the western regions of the Caliphate, particularly in Baghdad and surroundings, which feared being degraded to a mere province. This was furthered when the new Caliph entrusted the governance of the state to Fadl ibn Sahl, who intended to permanently move the Muslim world's centre of power eastwards to Khurasan, where he and his circle could control the reins of power to the exclusion of other groups. Fadl was also responsible for side-lining many other supporters of al-Ma'mun; thus, when Harthama ibn A'yan went to Marv to inform al-Ma'mun of the real situation in the west, the Sahlids turned the Caliph against him and he was executed on charges of treason in June 816. In response, Harthama's son Hatim led a short-lived revolt in Armenia.

The result of these policies was that revolts and local power struggles erupted across the Caliphate, with only Khurasan and the frontier districts with the Byzantine Empire exempt from this turmoil. Iraq in particular descended into near-anarchy. The new governor of Iraq, Fadl's brother al-Hasan ibn Sahl, soon lost the support of the abnaʾ. The local population's alienation from his regime was exploited by the Zaydi Alids, who on 26 January 815 rose in revolt at Kufa, led by Abu'l-Saraya. The revolt spread quickly through Iraq region as various groups with old grievances against the Abbasids used the opportunity to exact revenge. The revolt was nominally led by the Alid Ibn Tabataba, and after his death by Zayd, a son of the imam Musa al-Kadhim who had been executed in 799 on Harun al-Rashid's orders. The uprising came close to threatening Baghdad itself, and it was only through the intervention of the capable Harthama that it was quelled, with Abu'l-Saraya being captured and executed in October. Secondary pro-Alid movements also seized control of Yemen (under Ibrahim al-Jazzar, another son of Musa al-Kadhim) and the Tihamah, including Mecca, where Muhammad al-Dibaj, a grandson of the Alid imam Ja'far al-Sadiq, was proclaimed anti-caliph in November 815. The suppression of these revolts was entrusted to Ali ibn Isa's son Hamdawayh, with an army of abnaʾ. Hamdawayh was successful in subduing these provinces, but then attempted, unsuccessfully, to secede from the Caliphate himself.

In 816, to bolster his flagging prestige, al-Ma'mun assumed the title "God's Caliph". Taking note of the widespread Alid support in his western provinces, al-Ma'mun not only spared the lives of the various Alid anti-caliphs, but on 24 March 817 also named the Alid Ali ibn Musa al-Ridha, third son of Musa al-Kadhim, as his heir apparent, and even changed the official dynastic colour from Abbasid black to Alid green. Although the seriousness of al-Ma'mun's commitment to the Alid succession is uncertain—there are suggestions that Ali al-Ridha was so old that he could hardly be expected to actually succeed al-Ma'mun—its impact was disastrous: not only did it fail to produce any tangible popular support, but also provoked an uproar among the members of the Abbasid family in Baghdad. Hasan ibn Sahl had already been forced to abandon the city, where various factional leaders now shared power, and the news of the Alid succession ruined his attempts at conciliation. Instead, on 17 July 817 the members of the Abbasid family in Baghdad nominated a new Caliph of their own, Harun al-Rashid's younger brother Ibrahim. Ibrahim received broad backing from the Baghdad elites, from Abbasid princes like al-Ma'mun's younger brother Abu Ishaq (the future Caliph al-Mu'tasim, r. 833–842) to old-established members of the bureaucracy like Fadl ibn al-Rabi (who returned to his office as hajib), and leaders of the abnaʾ. As the scholar Mohamed Rekaya commented, "in other words, it was a revival of the war between the two camps [Baghdad and Khurasan], dormant since 813".

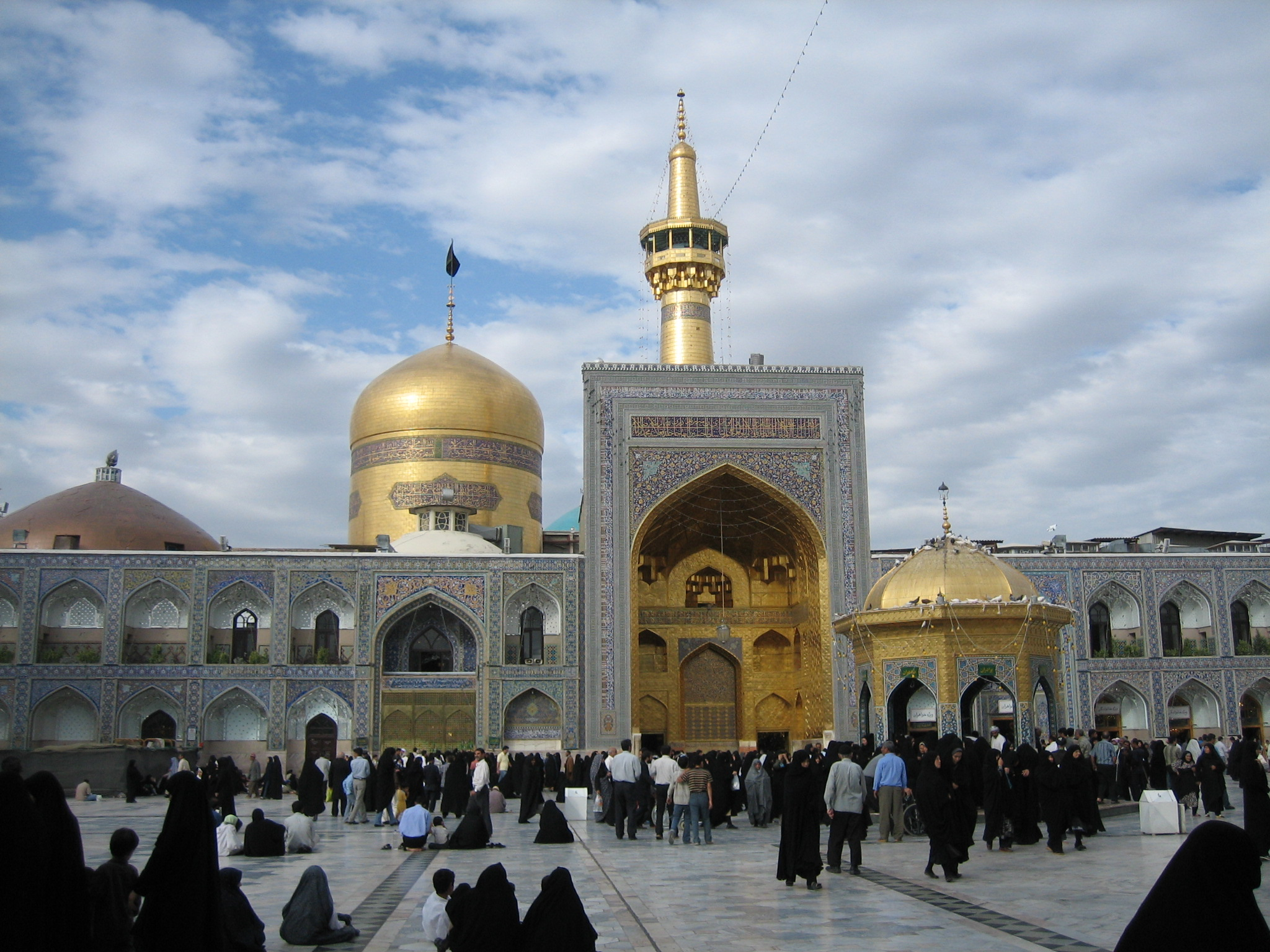
The Imam Reza shrine, erected over the grave of Ali ibn Musa al-Ridha

Ibrahim moved to secure control of Iraq, but although he captured Kufa, Hasan ibn Sahl, who had made Wasit his base of operations, managed to get to Basra first. However, the governor of Egypt, Abd al-Aziz al-Azdi, recognized Ibrahim as Caliph. In Khurasan, the Sahlids at first downplayed the events at Baghdad, falsely informing al-Ma'mun that Ibrahim had merely been declared governor (amir) rather than Caliph. Finally, in December 817 Ali al-Ridha succeeded in revealing to al-Ma'mun the real situation in Iraq, and convinced him that the turmoil in the Caliphate was far greater than the Sahlids presented it to be, and that a reconciliation with Baghdad was necessary. Al-Ma'mun now resolved to assume personal control of his empire, and on 22 January 818 he left Marv and began a very slow journey west to Baghdad. Fadl ibn Sahl was murdered on 13 February, probably on al-Ma'mun's orders, although the rest of his family was spared a persecution like that which had befallen the Barmakids. Indeed, Hasan ibn Sahl was for the time being confirmed in his brother's position, and al-Ma'mun was betrothed to one of his daughters. Ali al-Ridha also died during the march on 5 September, possibly of poison. His burial place at Sanabad, now known as Mashhad ("the place of martyrdom"), was to become a major Shi'a pilgrimage site.

In the meantime, back in Baghdad, Ibrahim faced desertions, rebellions and conspiracies, one of which involved his half-brother al-Mansur. Hasan ibn Sahl was able to use this turmoil and advance north, capturing Mada'in. As the months passed, discontent in Baghdad grew. Ibrahim's supporters, including Fadl ibn al-Rabi, began abandoning him, and in April and July 819 there was a plot to take Ibrahim captive and surrender him to al-Ma'mun's forces. Narrowly escaping from this conspiracy, Ibrahim abandoned the throne and went into hiding, opening the path for al-Ma'mun to reclaim Baghdad. On 17 August 819, al-Ma'mun entered Baghdad without resistance, and the political turmoil quickly subsided. Al-Ma'mun now set about to reconcile himself with the opposition: he rescinded the Alid succession, restored black as the dynastic colour, sent Hasan ibn Sahl into retirement, and recalled Tahir from his exile in Raqqa. Al-Ma'mun did however retain the title of imam, which became part of the standard caliphal titulature.

During the 812–813 siege of Baghdad, Tahir had established close ties with the abnaʾ, which now proved useful in smoothing their acceptance of al-Ma'mun. Tahir was further rewarded with the governorship of Khurasan in September 821, and when he died in October 822, he was succeeded by his son, Talha. For the next fifty years, the Tahirid line would provide the governors of a vast eastern province centred on Khurasan, while also providing the governors of Baghdad, securing the city's loyalty to the caliphal government even after the capital was moved to Samarra.

== Reunification and pacification of the Caliphate, 820–837 ==
At the time al-Ma'mun entered Baghdad, the western provinces of the Caliphate had slipped away from effective Abbasid control, with local rulers claiming various degrees of autonomy from the central government. Egypt had become divided between two bitterly hostile factions, one under Ubayd Allah ibn al-Sari which had come to control Fustat and the south, while his rival Ali ibn Abd al-Aziz al-Jarawi and his Qaysi Arabs controlled the north of the country around the Nile Delta. In addition, Alexandria was in the hands of a group of Andalusian exiles. In northern Syria and the Jazira, the traditionally dominant Qays tribe had taken control, led by Abdallah ibn Bayhas and Nasr ibn Shabath al-Uqayli. Ifriqiya had fallen under the control of the Aghlabids, while Yemen was troubled by pro-Alid revolts. Perhaps the most threatening rebellion of all was the anti-Muslim Khurramite movement, which controlled large parts of Adharbayjan and Armenia.

To face these insurgencies, al-Ma'mun turned to another of Tahir's sons, Abdallah ibn Tahir, to whom he entrusted the command of his army. Ibn Tahir first targeted Nasr ibn Shabath in northern Syria and the Jazira. Nasr was willing to acknowledge al-Ma'mun's authority, but demanded concessions for his followers and remained hostile to the Abbasids' Persian officials, so that he had to be browbeaten into submission by a show of force before his capital, Kaysum, in 824–825. After securing his northern flank, Ibn Tahir marched through Syria into Egypt. There the two rivals, although not opposed in principle to al-Ma'mun as Caliph, were eager to maintain the status quo, and had already repulsed an invasion in 824 under Khalid ibn Yazid ibn Mazyad. Ibn Tahir however managed to outmanoeuvre both, so that Ali al-Jarawi quickly went over to him, leaving Ubayd Allah to submit and face deportation to Baghdad. In Alexandria, Ibn Tahir secured the departure of the Andalusians, who left the city for the Byzantine island of Crete, which they conquered and transformed into a Muslim emirate. On his return to Baghdad in 827, Abdallah ibn Tahir received a triumphal reception, and was appointed governor of Khurasan in 828, replacing Talha. His place in the west was taken over by al-Ma'mun's younger brother Abu Ishaq al-Mu'tasim. In Yemen, another Alid revolt broke out in 822 under Abd al-Rahman ibn Ahmad, but al-Ma'mun managed to secure his surrender by negotiations.

Elsewhere, however, the process of consolidation was harder, or failed completely: Aghlabid-controlled Ifriqiya was confirmed in its autonomous status, effectively slipping entirely from Abbasid control, while in Adharbayjan, al-Ma'mun's general Isa ibn Abi Khalid re-established control over the various local Muslim lords in the cities, but was unable to suppress the Khurramite revolt. Expeditions were sent against the Khurramites under Sadaka ibn Ali al-Azdi in 824 and Muhammad ibn Humayd al-Ta'i in 827–829, but both failed before the mountainous terrain and the Khurramites' guerrilla tactics, with Ibn Humayd losing his life as well. It was not until the accession of al-Mu'tasim, who employed his new military corps composed of Turkish slave-soldiers (mawali or ghilman) against the Khurramites, that their rebellion was suppressed in 837, after years of hard campaigning. Despite the restoration of caliphal authority in most provinces, the Caliphate continued to be troubled by rebellions: the rest of al-Ma'mun's reign saw a series of uprisings by the Zutt in lower Iraq, a three-year revolt against oppressive taxation in Egypt in 829, in which both the Christian Copts and the Muslims participated, as well as the unsuccessful revolt of Ali ibn Hisham, Ibn Humayd's successor as governor of Armenia and Adharbayjan.

== Aftermath and impact ==
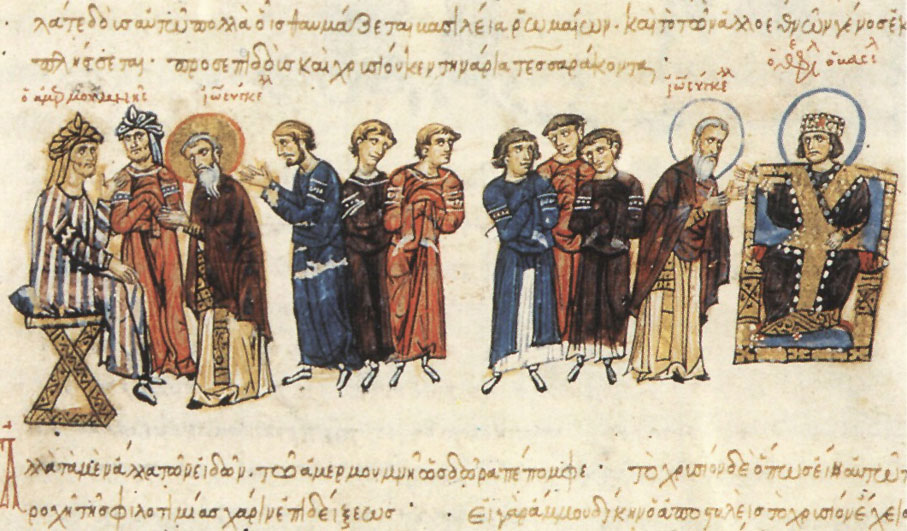
The Caliph al-Ma'mun (left) as depicted in the 13th-century Madrid Skylitzes manuscript, seen receiving the embassy of John the Grammarian in 829, sent by the Byzantine emperor Theophilos (depicted right)

The long civil war shattered the social and political order of the early Abbasid state, and a new system began to emerge under al-Ma'mun, which would characterize the middle period of the Abbasid Caliphate. The most tangible change was in the elites who supported the new regime: the abnaʾ, the old Arab families and the members of the Abbasid dynasty itself lost their positions in the administrative and military machinery, and with them their influence and power. The provinces of the Caliphate were now grouped into larger units, often controlled by a hereditary dynasty, like the Tahirids in Khurasan or the Samanids in Transoxiana, usually of Iranian descent. At the same time, however, al-Ma'mun tried to lessen his dependence on the Iranian element of his empire, and counterbalanced them through the creation of two new military corps: his brother Abu Ishaq's Turkish slaves, and the Arab tribal army of the Byzantine frontier, which was now reorganized and placed under the command of al-Ma'mun's son al-Abbas. This system was further elaborated and acquired its definite characteristics in the reign of Abu Ishaq (al-Mu'tasim), who created a tightly controlled, centralized state, and expanded his Turkish corps into an effective military force with which he waged campaigns against the Byzantines and internal rebellions alike. The Turkish leaders came to political power as provincial governors, while the old Arab and Iranian elites were completely sidelined. Al-Ma'mun's victory also had repercussions in the Abbasid official theological doctrine: in 829, al-Ma'mun adopted Mu'tazilism, in an attempt reconcile doctrinal differences in Islam and reduce social inequities.

At the same time, the willingness of al-Ma'mun and his successors to embrace the non-Arab populations of the Caliphate, especially in the Iranian East, as well as to entrust the governance of these provinces to local dynasties with considerable autonomy, helped to end a long series of religiously motivated rebellions and reconciled these populations to Islam: the rate of conversion during al-Ma'mun's reign increased markedly, and that was the time when most of the local princely families of the Iranian lands finally became Muslims. As El-Hibri comments, "in time this development represented a prelude to the emergence of autonomous provincial dynasties in the east, which would relate to the caliphal centre in nominal terms of loyalty only".

== Notes ==
a: At the outbreak of the civil war, large parts of Syria threw off allegiance to the Abbasids. The governor in Damascus, the Abbasid prince Sulayman ibn Abi Ja'far, was expelled by pro-Umayyad forces with particular backing from the Kalb tribe. A descendant of the Umayyad caliph Mu'awiya I, Abu al-Umaytir al-Sufyani, was proclaimed caliph in Damascus in 811 and gained recognition in Homs and other parts of Syria. He was less well-received by the Kalb's longtime rivals, the Qays, who mobilized against Abu al-Umaytir and the Kalb under the pro-Abbasid tribal chief, Ibn Bayhas al-Kilabi. The latter toppled the Umayyad government in Damascus in 813 and was recognized as governor by al-Ma'mun. Ibn Bayhas ruled semi-independently, even minting his own coins. He remained in office until being dismissed in the mid-820s by al-Ma'mun's viceroy over Syria and the Jazira, Abd Allah ibn Tahir ibn al-Husayn.
b: The relationship between the Abbasids and the Alids was troubled and underwent many changes. The Alids, claiming descent from Muhammad, had been the focal point of several failed revolts directed against the Umayyads–whose regime was widely regarded as oppressive and more concerned with the worldly aspects of the caliphate than the teachings of Islam–inspired by the belief that only a "chosen one from the Family of Muhammad" (al-ridha min Al Muhammad) would have the divine guidance necessary to rule according to the Quran and the Sunnah and create a truly Islamic government that would bring justice to the Muslim community. However, it was the Abbasid family, who like the Alids formed part of the Banu Hashim clan and hence could lay claim to be members of the wider "Family of the Prophet", who successfully seized the Caliphate. Following the Abbasid Revolution, the Abbasids tried to secure Alid support or at least acquiescence through salaries and honours at court, but some, chiefly the Zaydi and Hasanid branches of the Alids, continued to reject them as usurpers. Thereafter, periods of conciliatory efforts alternated with periods of suppression by the caliphs, provoking Alid uprisings which were followed in turn by large-scale persecutions of the Alids and their supporters.

== Sources ==
- Cobb, Paul M. (2001). White Banners: Contention in 'Abbasid Syria, 750–880. SUNY Press. ISBN 978-0791448809.
- Daniel, Elton L. (1979). The Political and Social History of Khurasan under Abbasid Rule, 747–820. Minneapolis & Chicago: Bibliotheca Islamica, Inc. ISBN 0-88297-025-9.
- El-Hibri, Tayeb (2010). "The empire in Iraq, 763–861". In Robinson, Chase F. (ed.). The New Cambridge History of Islam, Volume 1: The Formation of the Islamic World, Sixth to Eleventh Centuries. Cambridge: Cambridge University Press. pp. 269–304. ISBN 978-0-521-83823-8.
- Fishbein, Michael, ed. (1992). The History of al-Ṭabarī, Volume XXXI: The War Between Brothers: The Caliphate of Muḥammad al-Amīn, A.D. 809–813/A.H. 193–198. SUNY Series in Near Eastern Studies. Albany, New York: State University of New York Press. ISBN 978-0-7914-1085-1.
- Gabrieli, F. (1960). "al-Amīn". In Gibb, H. A. R.; Kramers, J. H.; Lévi-Provençal, E.; Schacht, J.; Lewis, B. & Pellat, Ch. (eds.). The Encyclopaedia of Islam, Second Edition. Volume I: A–B. Leiden: E. J. Brill. pp. 437–438. doi:10.1163/1573-3912_islam_SIM_0599. OCLC 495469456.
- Kennedy, Hugh (2004) [1986]. The Prophet and the Age of the Caliphates: The Islamic Near East from the 6th to the 11th Century (Second ed.). Harlow: Longman. ISBN 978-0-582-40525-7.
- Madelung, Wilferd (2000). "Abūʾl-Amayṭar al-Sufyānī". Jerusalem Studies in Arabic and Islam. 24: 327–341.
- Rekaya, M. (1991). "al-Maʾmūn". In Bosworth, C. E.; van Donzel, E. & Pellat, Ch. (eds.). The Encyclopaedia of Islam, Second Edition. Volume VI: Mahk–Mid. Leiden: E. J. Brill. pp. 331–339. doi:10.1163/1573-3912_islam_SIM_4889. ISBN 978-90-04-08112-3.
