= Nasr ibn Shabath al-Uqayli =

Rebel leader of caliph Al-Ma'mun's era

- Era: Abbasid Caliphate
- Known for: Rebellion against Abbasid Caliphate during the Fourth Fitna
- Father: Shabath

Nasr ibn Shabath al-Uqayli (fl. 811–825) was the leader of a rebellion of the Qays tribe in the Jazira against the central Abbasid government during the civil war of the Fourth Fitna.

== Life ==
Nasr appears in 811/812, when Caliph al-Amin (r. 809–813) sent his general, Abd al-Malik ibn Salih, to Syria to recruit troops for the civil war against his brother, al-Ma'mun (r. 813–833). The Syrians heeded Abd al-Malik's call and assembled at Raqqa, but soon a fierce and bloody conflict broke out between the Abbasid regular troops, the abnaʾ, and a group known in the sources by the term Zawaqil, probably Qaysi brigands, when a soldier of the abnaʾ discovered one of the Zawaqil riding his own stolen horse. The bulk of the Syrian levies left Raqqa, but Nasr led an attack by the Zawaqil against the Abbasid army, which was defeated with heavy losses for the Zawaqil.

As the civil war continued, the Abbasid government's hold on the region of Syria, the Jazira and other provinces collapsed, with local magnates taking hold of the cities and districts as autonomous rulers. Nasr was able to gather enough support from the Zawaqil to secure control over much of the Jazira, frequently co-operating with another Zawaqil leader, Abbas ibn Zufar al-Hilali of Cyrrhus, and the Qaysi tribal leader Uthman ibn Thumama in northern Syria. Nasr and his followers did not oppose the Abbasids or Caliph al-Ma'mun outright, but rather sought to defend the traditional position of the Arab tribes against what they saw as the increasing domination of the Abbasid government by the mostly Iranian supporters (derisively called ʿajam by the Arabs) of al-Ma'mun.

Nasr was heavily involved in the power struggles of the region. Thus when the tribe of Tanukh tried to take the city of Aleppo from the Salih family, a branch of the Abbasids, Nasr and his ally Abbas came to the aid of the latter, defeating and dispersing the Tanukh. In 812, he assaulted Harran, threatening to destroy its great Christian church, and left only after receiving a payment of 5,000 dirhams in ransom. In 814, al-Ma'mun appointed Tahir ibn Husayn to subdue Nasr and his followers. Tahir at first made Harran his base, but the unruliness of his troops forced him to flee at night and encamp at Raqqa, which became his base of operations. Despite his ability, Tahir failed to make any progress against Nasr and the Arab tribesmen, who continued to raid and terrorize the region for a further decade.

When Tahir was appointed governor of Khurasan and the eastern caliphate in 821, he left Syria and the Jazira in the hands of his son Abdallah ibn Tahir al-Khurasani. Over the next five years, Abdallah gradually reduced Nasr's territory and killed off his followers, until he was driven to his last refuge, the fortress of Kaysum. In the end, in 824 or 825, Nasr was forced to offer his surrender in exchange for a document guaranteeing his safety—preserved by al-Tabari along with a letter sent to him exhorting him to lay down arms—a request which was granted by al-Ma'mun. The fortress of Kaysum was torn down by Abdallah, and Nasr was brought to Baghdad. Nothing is known of him thereafter.

== See also ==
- List of people who disappeared mysteriously (pre-1910)

== Sources ==
- Bosworth, C.E. (1975). "The Ṭāhirids and Ṣaffārids". In Frye, Richard N. (ed.). The Cambridge History of Iran. Vol. 4. Cambridge: Cambridge University Press. pp. 90–135. ISBN 0-521-20093-8.
- Bosworth, C. E., ed. (1987). The History of al-Ṭabarī, Volume XXXII: The Reunification of the ʿAbbāsid Caliphate: The Caliphate of al-Maʾmūn, A.D. 813–33/A.H. 198–213. SUNY Series in Near Eastern Studies. Albany, New York: State University of New York Press. ISBN 978-0-88706-058-8.
- Bosworth, C.E. (1993). "Naṣr b. S̲h̲abat̲h̲". In Bosworth, C. E.; van Donzel, E.; Heinrichs, W. P. & Pellat, Ch. (eds.). The Encyclopaedia of Islam, Second Edition. Volume VII: Mif–Naz. Leiden: E. J. Brill. p. 1016. doi:10.1163/1573-3912_islam_SIM_5839. ISBN 978-90-04-09419-2.
- Cobb, Paul M. (2001). White Banners: Contention in ʿAbbāsid Syria, 750–880. Albany, NY: State University of New York Press. ISBN 978-0-7914-4880-9.
- Fishbein, Michael, ed. (1992). The History of al-Ṭabarī, Volume XXXI: The War Between Brothers: The Caliphate of Muḥammad al-Amīn, A.D. 809–813/A.H. 193–198. SUNY Series in Near Eastern Studies. Albany, New York: State University of New York Press. ISBN 978-0-7914-1085-1.
- Kennedy, Hugh (2004). The Prophet and the Age of the Caliphates: The Islamic Near East from the 6th to the 11th Century (Second ed.). Harlow: Longman. ISBN 978-0-582-40525-7.
- Segal, J. B. (2005). Edessa: The Blessed City. Gorgias Press LLC. ISBN 9781593331931.
