= Ali ibn Isa ibn Mahan =

Abbasid official and Governor of Khorasan

Shaykh hadhihi'l-dawla (title give by caliph al-Amin) Ali ibn Isa ibn Mahan علي بن عيسى بن ماهان

Commander of the Caliphal guard (Haras)
- In office 780s–796

Governor of Khorasan
- In office 796–807/808
- Monarch: Harun al-Rashid

Personal details
- Born: Abbasid Caliphate
- Died: 3 July 811 Baghdad, Abbasid Caliphate
- Children: Isa, Husayn
- Parent: Isa ibn Mahan

Military service
- Allegiance: Abbasid Caliphate
- Years of service: 780–811
- Rank: Commander
- Battles/wars: Fourth Fitna

Ali ibn Isa ibn Mahan (Arabic: علي بن عيسى بن ماهان, romanized: ʿAlī ibn ʿĪsā ibn Māhān; fl. 779/80 – 3 July 811) was an Iranian military leader of the Abbasid Caliphate in the late 8th and early 9th centuries.

== Origin and early career ==
Ali's father, Isa ibn Mahan, was an early follower and da'i of the Hashimiyya; he mutinied after the Abbasid Revolution and was executed by Abu Muslim. Ali himself appears first in 779/80, under Caliph al-Mahdi (r. 775–785), as commander of the caliphal guard (ḥaras). He then served as commander of the guard of the heir-apparent al-Hadi (r. 785–786), and continued in the post after the latter's accession. Under al-Hadi, he also occupied the posts of secretary of the army department (diwan al-jund), the powerful post of chamberlain (hajib) and director of the treasures.

== Governorship of Khurasan under Harun al-Rashid ==
Under Harun al-Rashid (r. 786–809) he continued to serve as commander of the guard until 796, when he was named governor of Khurasan, over the objections of Yahya al-Barmaki. As a leader of the abna al-dawla, the troops that formed the core of the Abbasid army in Iraq, he antagonized the Khurasanis and oppressed them through heavy taxation, with the revenue diverted for the upkeep of the abna and for filling his own coffers; during his eight-year tenure, he amassed a vast fortune.

His misgovernment provoked widespread discontent, and a spate of Kharijite uprisings. In April 805, as more and more complaints reached Harun, he went to Rayy to inspect the situation for himself. However, when Ali came and presented himself before the Caliph, he brought with him an enormous treasure in precious objects—worth 30 million gold dinars according to one source—which he liberally distributed to the Caliph's entourage and family. As a result, Harun not only kept him in place, but even accompanied him for part of his return journey, a rare mark of honour.

Eventually, Ali's misconduct resulted in the outbreak of a major rebellion under Rafi ibn al-Layth, which eventually required the personal intervention of Harun al-Rashid in 808.

== Return to prominence under al-Amin and the civil war ==
Replaced by Harthama ibn A'yan and disgraced, Ali rose again to prominence after the death of Harun in March 809. As many of the Baghdadi elites, he was a strong supporter of the new Caliph, al-Amin (r. 809–813), who honoured him with the appellation shaykh hadhihi'l-dawla ("elder of this dynasty") and put him in charge of the affairs of his own heir, Musa.

In early 811, with the outbreak of civil war between al-Amin and his brother al-Ma'mun (r. 813–833), who had been given a large viceregal domain encompassing Khurasan, al-Amin entrusted Ali with the subduing al-Ma'mun and his followers. At the head of a huge army of reportedly 50,000 men drawn from the abna, Ali marched east, but in the Battle of Ray on 3 July 811 he was crushingly defeated and killed by a far smaller army of al-Ma'mun under Tahir ibn al-Husayn.

== Descendants ==
Of his sons, Isa served his father as deputy governor for Sistan, but was killed by Rafi ibn al-Layth's supporters in 807. Another son, al-Husayn, also served in Sistan during Ali's governorship of Khurasan, and suppressed an anti-Abbasid rebellion and recruited troops in Syria in 811/2. With the advance of al-Ma'mun's troops, which led to the Siege of Baghdad (812–813), al-Husayn briefly imprisoned al-Amin and tried to rouse the citizens of Baghdad to switch their allegiance to al-Ma'mun, but failed and was killed.

== Sources ==
- Bosworth, C. E., ed. (1989). The History of al-Ṭabarī, Volume XXX: The ʿAbbāsid Caliphate in Equilibrium: The Caliphates of Mūsā al-Hādī and Hārūn al-Rashīd, A.D. 785–809/A.H. 169–192. SUNY Series in Near Eastern Studies. Albany, New York: State University of New York Press. ISBN 978-0-88706-564-4.
- Crone, Patricia (1980). Slaves on Horses: The Evolution of the Islamic Polity (1980 ed.). Cambridge: Cambridge University Press. ISBN 978-0521229616.
- Kennedy, Hugh (2004) [1986]. The Prophet and the Age of the Caliphates: The Islamic Near East from the 6th to the 11th Century (Second ed.). Harlow: Longman. pp. 144–148. ISBN 978-0-582-40525-7.
- Mottahedeh, Roy (1975). "The ʿAbbāsid Caliphate in Iran". In Frye, Richard N. (ed.). The Cambridge History of Iran: From the Arab Invasion to the Saljuqs. Vol. 4. Cambridge: Cambridge University Press. pp. 57–90. ISBN 0-521-20093-8.
- Sourdel, Dominique (1971). "Ibn Māhān". In Lewis, B.; Ménage, V. L.; Pellat, Ch. & Schacht, J. (eds.). The Encyclopaedia of Islam, Second Edition. Volume III: H–Iram. Leiden: E. J. Brill. p. 859. OCLC 495469525.
