= Abidah Al-Madaniyya =

- Occupation: Slave
- Known for: Hadith Scholar
- Spouse: Habib Dahhun
- Relatives: Abda bin Bishr (granddaughter)

Abidah Al-Madaniyyah was an Islamic hadith scholar.

== Early life ==
Al-Madaniyyah was born into slavery in what is now Saudi Arabia. She was owned by Muhammad ibn Yazid and spent her early life learning hadiths with teachers in Medina.

== Marriage and freedom ==
Al-Madaniyyah's enslaver, Muhammad ibn Yazid, gave her as a gift to Habib Dahhun, a Spanish man from Andalusia who was also a hadith scholar, when Dahhun visited Jerusalem on his way to perform the Hajj Islamic pilgrimage. Dahhun was so impressed by her knowledge of 10,000 hadiths that he freed her and married her.

== Legacy ==
She was the grandmother of hadith scholar Abda bin Bishr.
