= Harthama ibn A'yan =

Abbasid provincial governor and general (died 816)

Harthama ibn A'yan هرثمة بن أعين

Abbasid governor of Egypt
- In office 794–795
- Monarch: Harun al-Rashid
- Preceded by: Ishaq ibn Sulayman
- Succeeded by: Abd al-Malik ibn Salih

Abbasid governor of Ifriqiya
- In office 795–797
- Monarch: Harun al-Rashid
- Preceded by: Al-Fadl ibn Rawh ibn Hatim al-Muhallabi
- Succeeded by: Muhammad ibn Muqatil al-Akki

Abbasid governor of Mosul
- In office 798–802
- Monarch: Harun al-Rashid
- Preceded by: Yahya ibn Sa'id al-Harashi
- Succeeded by: Nadal ibn Rifas

Abbasid governor of Palestine
- Monarch: Harun al-Rashid

Personal details
- Born: Balkh, Abbasid Caliphate
- Died: June 816 Abbasid Caliphate
- Parent: A'yan

Military service
- Allegiance: Abbasid Caliphate
- Years of service: 790s - 816; 816 (end of service)
- Rank: Abbasid army general

Harthama ibn A'yan (Arabic: هرثمة بن أعين; died June 816) was a Khurasan-born general and governor of the early Abbasid Caliphate, serving under the caliphs al-Hadi, Harun al-Rashid and al-Ma'mun. He played an important role in the victory of al-Ma'mun in the Abbasid civil war, but was executed at his orders when he protested against the power of the Sahlid family that dominated his court.

== Biography ==
A native of Balkh, Harthama was a mawla of the Banu Dabba tribe. He first appears during the reign of the second Abbasid Caliph, al-Mansur (reigned 754–775), as one of the supporters of the Abbasid prince and heir-apparent Isa ibn Musa. Isa was forced to renounce his claim on the throne in favour of al-Mansur's son, al-Mahdi (r. 775–785), who had Harthama brought to Baghdad in chains and kept him under arrest throughout his reign.

Under al-Mahdi's son and successor al-Hadi (r. 785–786), however, he was released and rose to prominence as one of the Caliph's closest advisors. At one point he is said to have recommended that the Caliph should execute his younger brother and heir-apparent, the future caliph Harun al-Rashid (r. 786–809) to open the path for the succession of al-Hadi's own sons, but this plan was foiled through the intervention of the Caliph's mother, al-Khayzuran. Nevertheless, when al-Hadi died it was Harthama himself who released Harun from prison.

He continued to enjoy a privileged position and high office under Harun as well, serving as governor of Palestine, Egypt, Mosul and then Ifriqiya, before assuming command of the caliphal guard (haras) under the supervision of Harun's trusted vizier, Ja'far ibn Yahya the Barmakid. From this post he played a role in the downfall of the Barmakids in 803, and established himself as one of the Caliphate's senior military leaders. He also led two summer raids into Asia Minor against the Byzantines. When the large-scale rebellion of Rafi ibn al-Layth broke out in Khurasan in 805–806 and the local governor, Ali ibn Isa ibn Mahan, proved himself incapable of suppressing it, al-Rashid sent Harthama to replace him, following himself shortly after, in 808.

Harthama was in Samarkand when al-Rashid died at Tus in March 809, and remained in the east after. Consequently, he threw in his lot with al-Ma'mun (r. 813–833) in the civil war against al-Amin (r. 809–813), and was along with Tahir ibn Husayn one of the two commanders of al-Ma'mun's army during the crucial year-long siege of Baghdad in 812–813. During the siege he led the attack from the east while Tahir commanded from the west. In the final stage of the siege, Harthama tried unsuccessfully to secure the surrender and life of al-Amin, by sending a boat to ferry him over the Tigris. The boat, however, capsized, and al-Amin was captured and executed by Tahir's men.

Harthama remained in Iraq after that, and played a leading role in defeating the pro-Alid revolt of Abu'l-Saraya in 815. Soon after he was appointed as governor of Arabia and Syria, but instead of taking up his post Harthama went east with the intention of appraising al-Ma'mun, who had remained in Merv, of the real situation in Iraq, and especially the resentment caused by the government's domination by a group of Khurasanis around al-Ma'mun's vizier, al-Fadl ibn Sahl. Al-Fadl and his supporters were however able to turn al-Ma'mun against Harthama, who was imprisoned and executed in June 816. In response to the news of his execution, Harthama's son Hatim, the governor of Arminiya, led a rebellion that was however cut short by his own death. Another son, A'yan, governor of Sistan c. 820, is also known, and his descendants through Hatim continued to occupy high offices until well into the 9th century.

== Sources ==
- Crone, Patricia (1980). Slaves on Horses: The Evolution of the Islamic Polity (1980 ed.). Cambridge: Cambridge University Press. ISBN 978-0521229616.
- Kennedy, Hugh (2004) [1986]. The Prophet and the Age of the Caliphates: The Islamic Near East from the 6th to the 11th Century (Second ed.). Harlow: Longman. ISBN 978-0-582-40525-7.
- Pellat, Ch. (1971). "Hart̲h̲ama b. Aʿyan". In Lewis, B.; Ménage, V. L.; Pellat, Ch. & Schacht, J. (eds.). The Encyclopaedia of Islam, Second Edition. Volume III: H–Iram. Leiden: E. J. Brill. p. 231. doi:10.1163/1573-3912_islam_SIM_2744. OCLC 495469525.
- Rekaya, M. (1991). "al-Maʾmūn". In Bosworth, C. E.; van Donzel, E. & Pellat, Ch. (eds.). The Encyclopaedia of Islam, Second Edition. Volume VI: Mahk–Mid. Leiden: E. J. Brill. pp. 331–339. doi:10.1163/1573-3912_islam_SIM_4889. ISBN 978-90-04-08112-3.

Preceded by Ishaq ibn Sulayman al-Hashimi	Governor of Egypt; 794–795	Succeeded by Abd al-Malik ibn Salih
