= Muhammad ibn Yaqut =

Abbasid Caliphate official

Abu Bakr Muhammad ibn Yaqut (Arabic: أبو بكر محمد بن ياقوت) was an official who played a major role in the tumultuous political affairs of the Abbasid Caliphate in 930–935, particularly during the reign of al-Qahir (932–934) and the early months of the reign of ar-Radi, when he was the most powerful man in the state. His rivals secured his dismissal and imprisonment in April 935, and he died in prison soon after.

== Under al-Muqtadir ==
Muhammad's father Yaqut was serving as head chamberlain (hajib) of Caliph al-Muqtadir (r. 908–932) in 930, when Muhammad was appointed head of the security forces (sahib al-shurta) in the Abbasid capital, Baghdad, which at the time was plagued by armed clashes between rival factions in the military; during one such clash in February, Muhammad intervened on the side of the Hujariyya cavalry, forcing their opponents of the infantry to abandon the city, except for a contingent of black African troops who surrendered. The latter mutinied because of pay arrears a few months later, and were also expelled from Baghdad, after which they were attacked and destroyed near Wasit by the Abbasid commander-in-chief, Mu'nis al-Muzaffar.

Soon after, however, Muhammad and Mu'nis fell out, and in June/July 931 Muhammad was dismissed. Mu'nis pressed for his banishment, and despite initial reluctance, al-Muqtadir bowed to his pressure: in July 931, July was sent to the remote province of Sijistan. When al-Muqtadir fell out with Mu'nis, Muhammad was recalled, arriving in Baghdad in January 932. He was sent at the head of an army to Takrit, but when Mu'nis set out from Mosul towards Baghdad, Muhammad and his fellow commander Sa'id ibn Hamdan withdrew without giving battle with Mu'nis' forces.

== Under al-Qahir and al-Radi ==
Mu'nis was victorious and killed al-Muqtadir before Baghdad in October 932, installing al-Qahir (r. 932–934) on the throne. Muhammad, along with al-Muqtadir's son Abd al-Wahid, and others of al-Muqtadir's partisans, fled from the city to al-Mada'in and thence to Wasit. There a few of their generals defected, so that when the forces of the new regime, headed by the general Yalbaq, approached them, they fled to Tustar. Muhammad's arrogant and selfish behaviour quickly alienated his followers, who one by one began deserting him. After Abd al-Wahid too surrendered, Muhammad negotiated his surrender and pardon with Yalbaq.

On his return to Baghdad, he quickly rose to great favour with al-Qahir, and remained an influential member of the court for the duration of his brief reign. Indeed, when al-Qahir was deposed and ar-Radi (r. 934–940) installed as caliph in April 934, Muhammad was appointed hajib and commander-in-chief of the army, thus rising in power above even the vizier Ibn Muqla, and becoming the de facto ruler of the state. From this position, he headed an expedition against Harun ibn Gharib, a cousin of al-Muqtadir and governor of Mah al-Kufa, who had rebelled against al-Radi. In May 934, Muhammad was defeated in battle by Harun's troops, but Harun was killed soon after by one of Muhammad's slaves, and his rebellion collapsed.

Muhammad's very power earned him many enemies at court, particularly Ibn Muqla, who persuaded al-Radi to move against him: on 12 April 935, Muhammad, his brother Abu'l-Fath al-Muzaffar, and his secretary Abu Ishaq al-Qarariti, were arrested. Muhammad died in prison soon after.

== Sources ==
- Zetterstéen, K. V. (1993). "Muḥammad b. Yāḳūt". In Bosworth, C. E.; van Donzel, E.; Heinrichs, W. P. & Pellat, Ch. (eds.). The Encyclopaedia of Islam, Second Edition. Volume VII: Mif–Naz. Leiden: E. J. Brill. pp. 413–414. doi:10.1163/1573-3912_islam_SIM_5374. ISBN 978-90-04-09419-2.
