= Al-Amin =

6th Abbasid caliph (r. 809–813)

al-Amin الأمين
- Khalifah; Amir al-Mu'minin
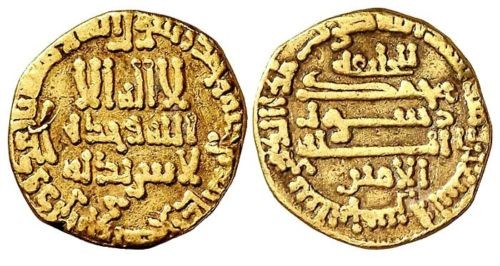
- Gold dinar of al-Amin, minted in Baghdad in 811

6th Caliph of the Abbasid Caliphate
- Reign: 24 March 809 – 27 September 813
- Predecessor: Harun al-Rashid
- Successor: al-Ma'mun
- Born: April 787; Baghdad, Abbasid Caliphate
- Died: 25 September 813 (aged 26); Baghdad, Abbasid Caliphate
- Burial: Baghdad, Iraq
- Consorts: List: Lubana bint Ali ibn al-Mahdi; Fatm; Umm Abdullah; Arib; Faridah; Hadiyya; Badhal; Da'f
- Issue: Musa; Abdallah
Names
- Abū Mūsā Muḥammad ibn Hārūn al-Amīn
- Dynasty: Abbasid
- Father: Harun al-Rashid
- Mother: Zubaidah bint Ja`far
- Religion: Sunni Islam

Abū Mūsā Muḥammad ibn Harun al-Amīn (Arabic: أبو موسى محمد بن هارون الأمين; April 787 – 24/25 September 813), better known by just his laqab of al-Amīn (Arabic: الأمين, lit. 'the Trustworthy'), was the sixth Abbasid caliph from 809 to 813.

Al-Amin succeeded his father, Harun al-Rashid, in 809 and ruled until he was deposed and killed in 813, during the civil war by his half-brother, al-Ma'mun.

== Early life and career ==
Muhammad, the future al-Amin, was born in April 787 to the Abbasid caliph Harun al-Rashid (r. 786–809) and Zubayda, herself descended from the second Abbasid caliph, al-Mansur (r. 754–775).

His mother, Zubayda was the first wife Harun al-Rashid. They both married in 781–82, at the residence of Muhammad ibn Sulayman in Baghdad. She was the daughter of Abbasid prince Ja'far ibn Abdallah al-Mansur and Salsal bint Atta.

=== Appointment as first heir and successor ===
Muhammad had an elder half-brother, Abdallah, the future al-Ma'mun (r. 813–833), who had been born in September 786. However, Abdallah's mother was a Persian slave concubine, and his pure Abbasid lineage gave Muhammad seniority over his half-brother. Indeed, he was the only Abbasid caliph to claim such descent. Already in 792, Harun had Muhammad receive the oath of allegiance (bay'ah) with the name of al-Amīn ("The Trustworthy"), effectively marking him out as his main heir, while Abdallah was not named second heir, under the name al-Maʾmūn ("The Trusted One") until 799. Both brothers were assigned members of the powerful Barmakid family as tutors: al-Amin's tutor was al-Fadl ibn Yahya, while al-Ma'mun's was Ja'far ibn Yahya.

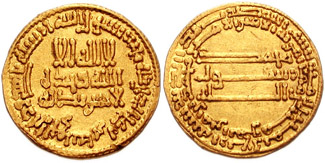
Dinar of Harun minted in Baghdad 184 AH (800 CE) with the name of Commander of the Faithful Harun al-Rashid and his first Heir, prince al-Amin

These arrangements were confirmed and publicly proclaimed in 802, when Harun and the most powerful officials of the Abbasid government made the pilgrimage to Mecca. Al-Amin would succeed Harun in Baghdad, but al-Ma'mun would remain al-Amin's heir and would additionally rule over an enlarged Khurasan. This was an appointment of particular significance, as Khurasan had been the starting-point of the Abbasid Revolution which brought the Abbasids to power, and retained a privileged position among the Caliphate's provinces. Furthermore, the Abbasid dynasty relied heavily on Khurasanis as military leaders and administrators. Many of the original Khurasani Arab army (Khurasaniyya) that came west with the Abbasids were given estates in Iraq and the new Abbasid capital, Baghdad, and became an elite group known as the abnāʾ al-dawla ("sons of the state/dynasty"). This large-scale presence of an Iranian element in the highest circles of the Abbasid state, with the Barmakid family as its most notable representatives, was certainly a factor in the appointment of al-Ma'mun, linked through his mother with the eastern Iranian provinces, as heir and governor of Khurasan. The stipulations of the agreement, which were recorded in detail by the historian al-Tabari, accorded al-Mamun's Khurasani viceroyalty extensive autonomy. However, modern historians consider that these accounts may have been distorted by later apologists of al-Ma'mun in the latter's favour. Harun's third heir, al-Mu'tamin, received responsibility over the frontier areas with the Byzantine Empire in Upper Mesopotamia and Syria.

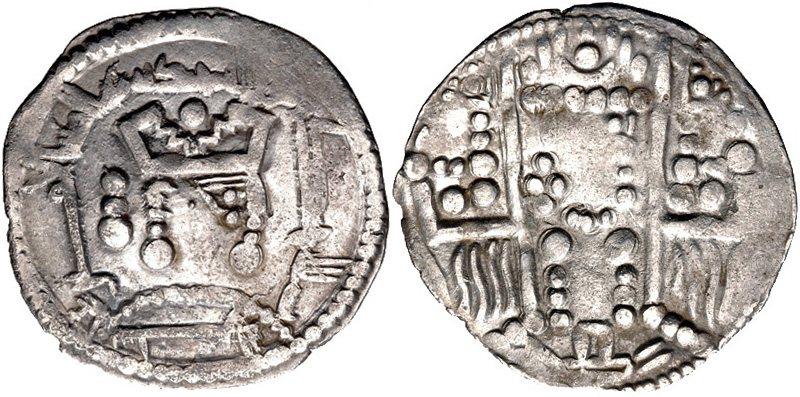
Bukharan coinage, naming al-Amin as governor of Khurasan, c. 796–801

These complex arrangements, sealed with mutual judicial and religious oaths, clearly demonstrate that Harun was conscious of their precariousness, in view of the profound differences between al-Amin and al-Ma'mun, both in character and in interests. Very quickly, this latent rivalry had important repercussions: almost immediately after the court returned to Baghdad in January 803, the Abbasid elites were shaken by the abrupt fall of the Barmakid family from power. On the one hand, this event may reflect the fact that the Barmakids had become indeed too powerful for the Caliph's liking, but its timing suggests that it was tied to the succession issue as well: with al-Amin siding with the abnāʾ and al-Ma'mun with the Barmakids, and the two camps becoming more estranged every day, if al-Amin was to have a chance to succeed, the power of the Barmakids had to be broken. Indeed, the years after the fall of the Barmakids saw an increasing centralization of the administration and the concomitant rise of the influence of the abnāʾ, many of whom were now dispatched to take up positions as provincial governors and bring these provinces under closer control from Baghdad. This led to unrest in the provinces, especially Khurasan, where local elites had a long-standing rivalry with the abnāʾ and their tendency to control of the province (and its revenues) from Iraq. The harsh taxation imposed by a prominent member of the abnāʾ, Ali ibn Isa ibn Mahan, even led to a revolt under Rafi ibn al-Layth, which eventually forced Harun himself, accompanied by al-Ma'mun and the powerful chamberlain (hajib) and chief minister al-Fadl ibn al-Rabi, to travel to the province in 808. Al-Ma'mun was sent ahead with part of the army to Marv, while Harun stayed at Tus, where he died on 24 March 809.

== Caliphate ==
When Harun al-Rashid died in March 809. (Harun had dismissed Ali and replaced him with Harthama ibn A'yan, and in 808 marched himself east to deal with the rebel Rafi ibn al-Layth, but died in March 809 while at Tus). Al-Amin smoothly succeeded him. The majority of army commanders on the Khorasan expedition decided to obey new caliph's order to return to Baghdad. The rebel chose to surrender himself to Harun's son and new governor of Khurasan, al-Ma'mun. He was pardoned, and nothing more is known of him after. Al-Amin continued the progressive moves of his father. The first two years of his reign were generally peaceful. During his reign, Ali ibn Isa rose to prominence, As many of the Baghdad's elites, he was a strong supporter of the new caliph, al-Amin, who honoured him with the appellation shaykh hadhihi'l-dawla ("elder of this dynasty") and put him in charge of the affairs of his own son, Musa ibn Muhammad al-Amin.

=== Hostility towards governor al-Mamun ===
Al-Ma'mun had mistrusted al-Amin before their father's death and convinced Harun to take him with him on Harun's last journey east. Although Harun had instructed the Baghdad commanders of this expedition to remain with al-Ma'mun, after Harun's death they returned to Baghdad. Harun's second heir, Abdallah (future al-Ma'mun), who was tasked with the governance of Khurasan, regarded the withdrawal of the entire army as a betrayal, and vainly tried to dissuade al-Fadl from this move. Al-Amin sought to turn al-Ma'mun's financial agent in Rayy against al-Ma'mun and he ordered al-Ma'mun to acknowledge al-Amin's son Musa as heir and return to Baghdad. Al-Ma'mun replaced his agent in Rayy and refused the orders.

The brothers had different mothers. Al-Amin was prompted to move against al-Ma'mun by meddlesome ministers, especially al-Fadl ibn al-Rabi. He had Harun's succession documents brought from Mecca to Baghdad, where he destroyed them. Then, he sent agents east to stir opposition to al-Ma'mun. However, a careful watch at the frontier denied them the opportunity. Al-Amin denied al-Ma'mun's request for his family and money and kept them in Baghdad.

Back in Baghdad, Al-Fadl ibn al-Rabi remained Amin's leading advisor, but his role in the governance of the state seems to have been limited. Nevertheless, he was the leading figure among those in the Abbasid establishment who pressured Amin into reversing his father's succession plans, removing Ma'mun from his place in the succession in favor of Amin's son Musa, and also as governor of Khurasan. This policy increased the already existing polarization of the Abbasid elites between the two princes, with the Khurasani nobility, headed by Ma'mun's vizier, al-Fadl ibn Sahl, flocking to Ma'mun, whom they saw as the champion of their interests against the central government in Baghdad. The breach between the two sides was complete in November 810, when Amin dropped Ma'mun's name from the Friday prayer.

=== Suppression of Internal rebellions ===
Sulayman ibn Abi Ja'far was entrusted by al-Amin to secure the oaths of allegiance to his caliphate from holdouts among the elite. Al-Amin, who was also related to Sulayman through his mother, reappointed Sulayman to govern Syria around 809–810 in response to unrest in Damascus emanating from the theft of a prized crystal pitcher from the Umayyad Mosque by the incumbent governor, Al-Amin's younger uncle Mansur ibn al-Mahdi. The outrage of the Damascenes prompted them to refuse prayer under Abbasid leadership. As governor of Syria, Sulayman was "a pillar of the 'Abbasid regime", according to the historian Wilferd Madelung.

After Al-Amin faced unrest in Syria. He sent Abd al-Malik ibn Salih to restore order there. There was fierce fighting and Abd al-Malik fell ill and died. Al-Amin sent Ahmad ibn Mazyad and Abdallah ibn Humayd east, each with an army (al-Tabari v. 31 p. 100 says each had 20,000 men). However, Tahir's agents sowed discord and these two armies fought against each other. Al-Amin suppressed the rebellion before his death.

Al-Amin faced an uprising in Baghdad led by Ali ibn Isa's son Husayn. This was quelled and Husayn was killed.

=== Civil war (811–813) ===
Under the influence of their respective ministers, al-Amin and al-Ma'mun took steps that further polarized the political climate and made the breach irreparable. After al-Ma'mun symbolically removed al-Amin's name from his coins and from the Friday prayer, in November 810 al-Amin removed al-Ma'mun and al-Mu'tamin from the succession and nominated his own sons Musa and Abdallah instead. Al-Ma'mun replied by declaring himself imam, a religious title which shied of directly challenging the Caliph but nevertheless implied independent authority, as well as hearkening back to the early days of the Hashimiyya movement which had carried the Abbasids to power.

Despite the reservations of some of his senior ministers and governors, two months later, in January 811, al-Amin formally began the civil war when he appointed Ali ibn Isa governor of Khurasan, placed him at the head of an unusually large army of 40,000 men, drawn from the abnaʾ, and sent him to depose al-Ma'mun. When Ali ibn Isa set out for Khurasan, he reportedly took along a set of silver chains with which to bind al-Ma'mun and carry him back to Baghdad.

In March 811 al-Amin dispatched an army under Ali ibn Isa ibn Mahan against al-Ma'mun. Ali advanced on Rayy. Al-Ma'mun's capable general Tahir bin Husain met and defeated Ali, who was killed.

After Ma'mun's forces scored an unexpected victory over the caliphal army at the Battle of Ray, the situation became critical in Baghdad, where many began to accuse Amin of idleness and complacency and Fadl of inefficient leadership. As Ma'mun's general Tahir ibn Husayn advanced through Iran, Fadl tried to reinforce the Baghdad troops (the abna al-dawla) with levies from the Arab tribes of Syria and the Jazira, but they soon fell out with the abna′, who were jealous of their pay and privileges, so that this project came to nothing. Seeing Amin's cause as lost, and with Ma'mun's troops approaching the capital, Fadl went into hiding.

Tahir took Ahwaz and gained control of Bahrayn and parts of Arabia. Basra and Kufa swore allegiance to al-Ma'mun. Tahir advanced on Baghdad and defeated a force sent against him. In Mecca, Dawud ibn Isa reminded worshippers that al-Amin had destroyed Harun ar Rashid's succession pledges and led them in swearing allegiance to al-Mamun. Dawud then went to Marv and presented himself to al-Ma'mun. Al-Ma'mun confirmed Dawud in his governorship of Mecca and Medina.

== Personal life ==
=== Family ===
Al-Amin's only wife was Lubana bint Ali ibn al-Mahdi, who was noted for her exceptional beauty. However, al-Amin died before the consummation of his marriage to Lubanah; her attested poetry includes a lament for his death: 'Oh hero lying dead in the open, betrayed by his commanders and guards. I cry over you not for the loss of my comfort and companionship, but for your spear, your horse and your dreams. I cry over my lord who widowed me before our wedding night'.

One of his concubines was Fatm, also known as Nazm and Umm Musa. She was the mother of his son Musa. She died during his reign, and he mourned her loss deeply. When his mother Zubaydah learned of his sorrow, she came to offer him solace, by reciting fitting verses from poetry. Another concubine was Umm Abdullah. She was the mother of his son Abdullah. She was a poetess. Another concubine was Arib. She asserted that she was the daughter of Ja'far ibn Yahya, a member of the Barmakid family, and claimed that she was abducted and sold as a child when the Barmakids lost their influence. Al-Amin acquired her and subsequently sold her to his brother al-Ma'mun. She gained recognition as a prominent poet, singer, and musician. Another concubine was Faridah. She was raised in the Hejaz. Initially, she served Harun al-Rashid's chamberlain, al-Rabi' ibn Yunus, where she learned to sing. Later, she came under the ownership of the Barmakid family. However, after Ja'far ibn Yahya's death and the Barmakids' downfall, she went into hiding. Despite efforts by Caliph al-Rashid to find her, she remained elusive. Following al-Rashid's death, she became the property of al-Amin, staying with him until his demise, after which she fled. She later married al-Haytham ibn Bassam and bore him a son named Abdullah. Upon al-Haytham's death, she married al-Sindi ibn al-Harashi. Another concubine was Hadiyya. She was a singer, who had been trained and presented to al-Amin by his uncle Ibrahim ibn al-Mahdi. Another concubine was Badhal. She had been formerly a concubine of al-Amin's cousin Ja'far bin al-Hadi. She hailed from Medina and was raised in Basra. Described as charming with fair skin, she was praised for her musical talent, particularly her skill in playing instruments, and was known for her exceptional ability as a songwriter and singer. After al-Amin's death, she became a concubine of Ali bin Hisham. Another concubine was Da'f. She was a songstress and was one of his favourites.

Al-Amin tried to nominate his sons, Musa and Abdullah, as heirs. Musa was born in 806, and died at a young age in December 823–January 824. Abdullah, who spent an extended period in the courts of subsequent caliphs, was the sole individual to continue the lineage of al-Amin.

=== Other alleged relationships ===
According to the Muslim historian Al Tabari, Al-Amin fell madly in love with one of his male slaves named Kauthar, whom he had named after a river in heaven. In an effort to dissuade her son from Kauthar, al-Amin's mother insisted that his female slaves dress in men's attire to encourage him to engage in sexual relationships with them.

== Death ==
In 812, Tahir advanced and set up camp near Baghdad's Anbar Gate and besieged the city. The effects of this siege were made more intense by the rampaging prisoners who broke out of jail. There were several vicious battles, such as at al-Amin's palace of Qasr Halih, at Darb al-Hijarah and the al-Shammasiyyah Gate. In that last one Tahir led reinforcements to regain positions lost by another officer. Overall the situation was worsening for al-Amin and he became depressed.

When Tahir pushed into the city, al-Amin sought to negotiate safe passage out. Tahir reluctantly agreed on the condition al-Amin turn over his sceptre, seal and other symbols of office. Al-Amin tried to leave on a boat, apparently with these symbols, rejecting warnings to wait. However, Tahir noticed the boat, and al-Amin was thrown into the water, swam to shore, was captured and then brought to a room, where he was executed. His head was placed on the Anbar Gate. Al-Tabari reports Tahir ibn al-Husayn’s letter to al-Maʾmun announcing the capture and execution of al-Amin and describing the restoration of order in Baghdad.

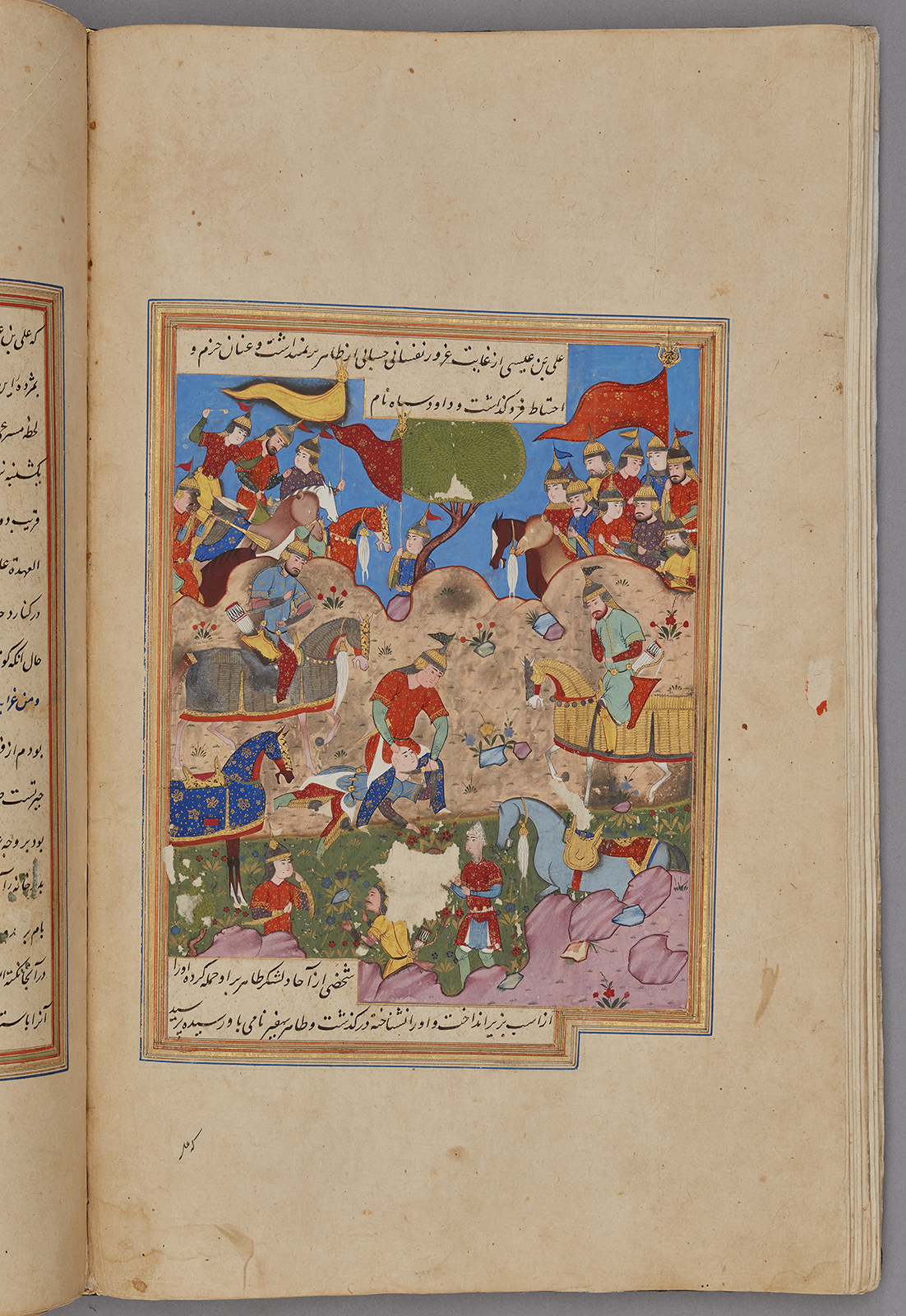
The victory of al-Maʿmun over al-Amin. Folio from a manuscript of Nigaristan, probably Shiraz, dated 1573–1574.

When al-Amin was killed, one of Zubaidah's eunuchs came to her and appealed to her to seek vengeance for al-Amin's blood as Aisha sought vengeance for the blood of Uthman (According to Eunuch's view). Zubaida, however, refused to do so. As al-Ma'mun refused to acknowledge al-Amin's son Musa as heir, the throne went to al-Ma'mun.

== See also ==
- Abbasa bint Sulayman, relative of Al-Amin
- Umm Isa bint Musa al-Hadi, cousin and sister-in-law of al-Amin.

== Sources ==
- El-Hibri, Tayeb (1999). "Al-Amīn: the challenge of regicide in Islamic memory". Reinterpreting Islamic Historiography: Hārūn al-Rashı̄d and the Narrative of the ʿAbbāsid Caliphate. Cambridge University Press. pp. 59–94. ISBN 0-521-65023-2.
- El-Hibri, Tayeb (2010). "The empire in Iraq, 763–861". In Robinson, Chase F. (ed.). The New Cambridge History of Islam, Volume 1: The Formation of the Islamic World, Sixth to Eleventh Centuries. Cambridge: Cambridge University Press. pp. 269–304. ISBN 978-0-521-83823-8.
- Abbott Nabia, Two Queens of Baghdad: Mother and Wife of Hārūn Al Rashīd, publisher=University of Chicago Press, year=1946, ISBN 978-0-86356-031-6
- Gabrieli, F. (1960). "al-Amīn". In Gibb, H. A. R.; Kramers, J. H.; Lévi-Provençal, E.; Schacht, J.; Lewis, B. & Pellat, Ch. (eds.). The Encyclopaedia of Islam, Second Edition. Volume I: A–B. Leiden: E. J. Brill. pp. 437–438. OCLC 495469456.
- Kennedy, Hugh (2004) [1986]. The Prophet and the Age of the Caliphates: The Islamic Near East from the 6th to the 11th Century (Second ed.). Harlow: Longman. ISBN 978-0-582-40525-7.
- Bosworth, C. E. (1995). "Rāfiʿ b. al- Layt̲h̲ b. Naṣr b. Sayyār". In Bosworth, C. E.; van Donzel, E.; Heinrichs, W. P. & Lecomte, G. (eds.). The Encyclopaedia of Islam, Second Edition. Volume VIII: Ned–Sam. Leiden: E. J. Brill. pp. 385–386. ISBN 978-90-04-09834-3.
- Kennedy, Hugh (2006). When Baghdad Ruled the Muslim World: The Rise and Fall of Islam's Greatest Dynasty. Cambridge, MA: Da Capo Press. ISBN 978-0-306814808.
- Sourdel, Dominique (1965). "al-Faḍl b. al-Rabīʿ". In Lewis, B.; Pellat, Ch. & Schacht, J. (eds.). The Encyclopaedia of Islam, Second Edition. Volume II: C–G. Leiden: E. J. Brill. pp. 730–731. OCLC 495469475.
- Fishbein, Michael, ed. (1992). The History of al-Ṭabarī, Volume XXXI: The War Between Brothers: The Caliphate of Muḥammad al-Amīn, A.D. 809–813/A.H. 193–198. SUNY Series in Near Eastern Studies. Albany, New York: State University of New York Press. ISBN 978-0-7914-1085-1.
- Madelung, Wilferd (2000). "Abūʾl ʿAmayṭar the Sufyānī". Jerusalem Studies in Arabic and Islam. 24: 327–343.
- Sourdel, Dominique (1971). "Ibn Māhān". In Lewis, B.; Ménage, V. L.; Pellat, Ch. & Schacht, J. (eds.). The Encyclopaedia of Islam, Second Edition. Volume III: H–Iram. Leiden: E. J. Brill. p. 859. OCLC 495469525.
- Crone, Patricia (1980). Slaves on Horses: The Evolution of the Islamic Polity (1980 ed.). Cambridge: Cambridge University Press. ISBN 978-0521229616.
- Rekaya, M. (1991). "al-Maʾmūn". In Bosworth, C. E.; van Donzel, E. & Pellat, Ch. (eds.). The Encyclopaedia of Islam, Second Edition. Volume VI: Mahk–Mid. Leiden: E. J. Brill. pp. 331–339. ISBN 978-90-04-08112-3.

al-Amin Abbasid dynasty Clan of the Banu Hashim Born: April 787 Died: 24/25 September 813
Sunni Islam titles
Preceded by Harun al-Rashid	Caliph of the Abbasid Caliphate; 24 March 809 – 24/25 September 813	Succeeded by al-Ma'mun
