= Nasr ibn Habib al-Muhallabi =

Nasr ibn Habib al-Muhallabi (Arabic: نصر بن حبيب المهلبي) was a member of the Muhallabid family who served as the governor of Ifriqiya for the Abbasid Caliphate, from 791 to 793.

== Career ==
Nasr is mentioned as having served under Yazid ibn Hatim al-Muhallabi while the latter was governor of Egypt (762–769); he was sent to put down a revolt at Sakha in 767 and was wounded during the fighting. He subsequently made his way to Ifriqiya, where according to al-Nuwayri he became well-liked and developed a reputation for good conduct. During the governorship of the infirm Rawh ibn Hatim al-Muhallabi (788–791), Nasr was secretly appointed by the caliph Harun al-Rashid as Rawh's successor, after the local postmaster informed Harun of Rawh's condition and urged him to preselect a replacement. Upon Rawh's death in early 791, his son Qabisah was initially proclaimed as his successor, but Nasr was recognized as governor after the postmaster delivered Harun's appointment letter to him.

Nasr's governorship lasted for approximately two years and seems to have proceeded without incident. His administration was brought to an end, however, after Rawh's son al-Fadl travelled to Harun's court and convinced the caliph to appoint him over Ifriqiya instead. Following his dismissal, Nasr appears to have remained in Ifriqiya until the death of al-Fadl, whereupon he and other Muhallabids were expelled from the province by 'Abdallah ibn al-Jarud.

According to al-Ya'qubi, Nasr was briefly appointed as the governor of Arminiya in ca. late 790s, but was dismissed shortly after.

== Notes ==
Preceded by Rawh ibn Hatim al-Muhallabi	Governor of Ifriqiya; 791–793	Succeeded by Al-Fadl ibn Rawh ibn Hatim al-Muhallabi
