= Al-Fadl ibn Rawh ibn Hatim al-Muhallabi =

Al-Fadl ibn Rawh ibn Hatim al-Muhallabi الفضل بن روح بن حاتم المهلبي

Abbasid Governor of Ifriqiya
- In office 793–794
- Monarch: Harun al-Rashid
- Preceded by: Nasr ibn Habib
- Succeeded by: Harthama ibn A'yan

Personal details
- Died: 794 al-Qayrawan, Abbasid Caliphate
- Parent: Rawh ibn Hatim (father)

Military service
- Allegiance: Abbasid Caliphate

Al-Fadl ibn Rawh ibn Hatim al-Muhallabi (Arabic: الفضل بن روح بن حاتم المهلبي) (d. 794) was a member of the Muhallabid family and a provincial governor for the Abbasid Caliphate. He was the last of the Muhallabid governors of Ifriqiya, serving there from 793 until his death.

== Career ==
Al-Fadl was the son of Rawh ibn Hatim al-Muhallabi, who was governor of Ifriqiya from 787 until 791. Following Rawh's death, Nasr ibn Habib al-Muhallabi became governor of the province, but al-Fadl, who was then in charge of the Zab region, wanted the position for himself. He therefore left Ifriqiya and made his way to the court of the caliph Harun al-Rashid, who he convinced to give him the appointment instead. Nasr was then dismissed and al-Muhallab ibn Yazid was made interim governor, until al-Fadl returned to the province in the spring of 791 and took up his new position.

Al-Fadl's governorship quickly became troubled due to his poor relations with the garrison troops (jund), who he dealt with harshly as a result of their continued preference for Nasr. These tensions became particularly acute in Tunis, where al-Fadl's governor and nephew al-Mughirah ibn Bishr ibn Rawh was detested by the local jund. The latter eventually wrote to al-Fadl, asking that a new governor be appointed, but al-Fadl refused their request. In response, the jund took matters into their own hands, organizing themselves under 'Abdallah ibn al-Jarud and expelling al-Mughirah from the city.

Following al-Mughirah's expulsion, Ibn al-Jarud initially attempted to reach an accord with al-Fadl, writing him to insist that no disloyalty against him was meant and asking that a suitable replacement be sent. Al-Fadl responded by appointing his cousin 'Abdallah ibn Yazid ibn Hatim over Tunis and sent him to take command of the city. When 'Abdallah ibn Yazid drew near to Tunis, however, he was met by a group sent by Ibn al-Jarud to speak to him; defying Ibn al-Jarud's orders, they attacked 'Abdallah ibn Yazid and killed him.

Now believing that reconciliation with al-Fadl was impossible, Ibn al-Jarud instead decided to rebel against him. He wrote to the commanders of each city in Ifriqiya, reminding them of how al-Fadl had abused them and urging them to join his cause. With much of the jund flocking to Ibn al-Jarud's side, al-Fadl was forced to march against the rebels. In the resulting battle, al-Fadl was defeated and he retreated back to al-Qayrawan; Ibn al-Jarud's army, however, pursued him and besieged the city for a short time. Eventually the inhabitants of al-Qayrawan agreed to open their doors to the rebels, allowing Ibn al-Jarud and his army to enter it in September 794. Following the conquest, al-Fadl and his followers departed from the city and headed to Qabis, but Ibn al-Jarud decided to not allow this and instead had al-Fadl killed.

== Notes ==
Preceded by Nasr ibn Habib al-Muhallabi	Governor of Ifriqiya; 793–794	Succeeded by Harthama ibn A'yan
