= Muhammad ibn Yazid al-Muhallabi =

Abbasid governor of Ahvaz

Muhammad ibn Yazid al-Muhallabi محمد بن يزيد المهلبي

Abbasid Governor of Ahvaz
- In office 810s–811/12
- Monarch: al-Amin

Personal details
- Born: Abbasid Caliphate
- Died: Late 811 or early 812 Ahvaz, Abbasid Caliphate
- Parent: Yazid ibn Hatim al-Muhallabi

Military service
- Allegiance: Abbasid Caliphate
- Years of service: 809–811
- Battles/wars: Fourth Fitna

Muhammad ibn Yazid ibn Hatim al-Muhallabi (Arabic: محمد بن يزيد بن حاتم المهلبي) (died late 811 or early 812) was an Abbasid governor of al-Ahwaz (southeastern Iraq) for the Abbasid dynasty during the caliphate of al-Amin. He was killed in the course of the civil war between al-Amin and al-Ma'mun while defending al-Ahwaz against the army of Tahir ibn al-Husayn.

== Career ==
Muhammad was a member of the prominent Muhallabid family, being a great-great-grandson of the eponymous al-Muhallab. At an unspecified date, he was appointed to the governorship of al-Ahwaz by the caliph al-Amin. When civil war broke out in early 811 between al-Amin, who was centered in Iraq, and his brother al-Ma'mun, who was in Khurasan, he remained loyal to al-Amin and defended al-Ahwaz for him.

When the war began, the fighting between the two sides did not initially take place near al-Ahwaz, but by the autumn of 811 al-Ma'mun's general Tahir had advanced from Khurasan to the district of Hulwan at the edge of northern Iraq. Soon after this, Muhammad received news that an army was marching from Hulwan to take al-Ahwaz; in response, he gathered his own forces and advanced north to 'Askar Mukram. As the enemy forces approached, however, he grew nervous and decided to return to al-Ahwaz. He therefore turned around and headed back to the city, with Tahir's men following close behind him.

As soon as Muhammad arrived at al-Ahwaz, he entered the city and prepared his men for combat. They quickly encountered Tahir's advance forces, who attacked them with stones and arrows. A fierce battle between the two sides followed, and soon many of Muhammad's soldiers began to flee. When Muhammad saw that he was losing the fight, he and several of his freedmen dismounted, hamstrung their horses and charged at Tahir's men, killing many of them. In the midst of the charge, however, Muhammad was hit by a spear and fell; a group of enemy soldiers then rushed him and struck him until he was dead. Tahir therefore won the battle and took al-Ahwaz.
