= Rafi ibn al-Layth =

8–9th-century Khurasani Arab noble and rebel

- Disappeared: c. 809; Greater Khorasan
- Known for: Leading large-scale rebellion against the Abbasid Caliphate

Rāfiʿ ibn al Layth ibn Naṣr ibn Sayyār (Arabic: رافع بن الليث بن نصر بن سيار) was a Khurasani Arab noble who led a large-scale rebellion against the Abbasid Caliphate in 806–809.

== Background ==
He was the grandson of the last Umayyad governor of Khurasan, Nasr ibn Sayyar. His father Layth was likely the "mawla of the amir al-mu'minin" whom Caliph al-Mansur sent as an envoy to the Turkish ruler of Farghana. According to al-Baladhuri, Rafi served as a garrison commander in Samarkand.

In 796, Caliph Harun al-Rashid appointed a prominent member of the Abbasid elites, Ali ibn Isa ibn Mahan, as the governor of Khurasan. Ali's ruthless exploitation of the province and oppressive fiscal measures caused much resentment among the local elites, as well as outbreaks of Kharijite uprisings. In April 805, as more and more complaints reached Harun, he went to Rayy to inspect the situation for himself. However, when Ali came and presented himself before the Caliph, he brought with him an enormous treasure in precious objects—worth 30 million gold dinars according to one source—which he liberally distributed to the Caliph's entourage and family. As a result, Harun not only kept him in place, but even accompanied him for part of his return journey, a rare mark of honour.

== Final years ==
Consequently, when in 806 Rafi launched a revolt in Samarkand, (Note: Al-Tabari does not mention any grievances against Ali ibn Isa as a reason for the revolt; rather, he attributes it to an illicit affair between Rafi and the wife of Yahya ibn al-Ash'ath ibn Yahya al-Ta'i, who went as far as renouncing Islam (and thus rendering her marriage to Yahya void) before remarrying Rafi. When Yahya complained to the Caliph, the latter ordered Ali to arrest Rafi. Rafi escaped from prison and raised a rebellion against Ali.) it spread quickly across Khurasan, finding support both among the Arabs and the Iranian natives. Rafi also secured the support of the Oghuz and Karluk Turks.

Harun al-Rashid dismissed Ali and replaced him with Harthama ibn A'yan, and in 808 marched himself east to deal with the situation, but died in March 809 while at Tus. After Harun's death, Rafi chose to surrender himself to Harun's son and new governor of Khurasan, al-Ma'mun. He was pardoned, and nothing more is known of him after.

== Sources ==
- Bosworth, C. E., ed. (1989). The History of al-Ṭabarī, Volume XXX: The ʿAbbāsid Caliphate in Equilibrium: The Caliphates of Mūsā al-Hādī and Hārūn al-Rashīd, A.D. 785–809/A.H. 169–192. SUNY Series in Near Eastern Studies. Albany, New York: State University of New York Press. ISBN 978-0-88706-564-4.
- Bosworth, C. E. (1995). "Rāfiʿ b. al- Layt̲h̲ b. Naṣr b. Sayyār". In Bosworth, C. E.; van Donzel, E.; Heinrichs, W. P. & Lecomte, G. (eds.). The Encyclopaedia of Islam, Second Edition. Volume VIII: Ned–Sam. Leiden: E. J. Brill. pp. 385–386. doi:10.1163/1573-3912_islam_SIM_6184. ISBN 978-90-04-09834-3.
- Daniel, Elton L. (1979). The Political and Social History of Khurasan under Abbasid Rule, 747–820. Minneapolis & Chicago: Bibliotheca Islamica, Inc. pp. 172ff. ISBN 978-0-88297-025-7.
- Kennedy, Hugh (2004). The Prophet and the Age of the Caliphates: The Islamic Near East from the 6th to the 11th Century (Second ed.). Harlow: Longman. ISBN 978-0-582-40525-7.
