= Elton L. Daniel =

American historian (born 1948)

Elton L. Daniel (born 1948) is an American historian and Iranologist.

He received his doctorate from University of Texas at Austin in 1978, and from 1981 to 2011 he was a professor of Middle Eastern and Islamic History at the University of Hawaiʻi. He retired in 2011. Daniel is the director of the Ehsan Yarshater Center for Iranian Studies at Columbia University and the former editor-in-chief of Encyclopaedia Iranica. He has conducted research and traveled extensively in Iran, Turkey, Syria, Egypt, France, and the United Kingdom.

He has published many books and articles pertaining to the history of Iran, including a revised translation of Al-Ghazali's Alchemy of Happiness.

== Works ==
He published several books as well as numerous article in the Encyclopaedia Iranica. His published monographs include the following:

- The Political and Social History of Khurasan under Abbasid Rule, 747-820, Bibliotheca Islamica (Minneapolis, Minnesota), 1979.
- The History of Iran, Greenwood Press (Westport, Connecticut), 2001.
- A Shi’ite Pilgrimage to Mecca (1885-1886), University of Texas Press (Austin, Texas), 1990 (as editor and translator, with Hafez Farmayan).
- Society and Culture in Qajar Iran: Studies in Honor of Hafez Farmayan, Mazda Publishers (Costa Mesa, California), 2002 (as editor).
- Culture and Customs of Iran, Greenwood Press (Westport, Connecticut), 2006 (with Ali Akbar Mahdi).
