= Abna al-dawla =

The abnāʾ ad-dawla (Arabic: أبناء الدولة, meaning "sons of the regime/dynasty"), often " the Abnāʾ", refers to the Khorasani Arabs who participated in the Abbasid Revolution of 749–750 and their descendants who settled in Baghdad and Iraq. They became the ruling elite of the Abbasid Caliphate and formed the mainstay of the caliphal army. The term rarely appears in the sources until the Fourth Fitna civil war in the 810s, when it was applied to the Khurasanis of Baghdad, who overwhelmingly supported Caliph al-Amin against his brother al-Ma'mun. The terms ahl Khurāsān ("people of Khurasan") and abnāʾ ahl Khurāsān ("sons of the people of Khurasan") are more frequently used for the Khurasanis who formed the mainstay of the Abbasid regime in general. Following al-Ma'mun's victory in the civil war, the abnāʾ al-dawla were largely replaced by the latter's Persian followers, and under his successor al-Mu'tasim, the rise of the Turkish slave-soldiers to power began.

== Sources ==
- Crone, Patricia (1998). "The 'Abbāsid Abnā' and Sāsānid Cavalrymen". Journal of the Royal Asiatic Society. 8 (1): 1–19. doi:10.1017/S1356186300016400. ISSN 1356-1863. JSTOR 25183463.
- Turner, John P. (2004). "The abnāʾ al-dawla: The Definition and Legitimation of Identity in Response to the Fourth Fitna". Journal of the American Oriental Society. 124 (1): 1–22. doi:10.2307/4132150. ISSN 0003-0279. JSTOR 4132150.
- Turner, John P. (2016). "Abnāʾ". In Fleet, Kate; Krämer, Gudrun; Matringe, Denis; Nawas, John; Rowson, Everett (eds.). Encyclopaedia of Islam (3rd ed.). Brill Online. ISSN 1873-9830.
