= Hajib =

Court official in early Muslim world

Hajib or hadjib (Arabic: الحاجب, romanized: al-ḥājib, [æl ˈħæːdʒib]) was a court official, equivalent to a chamberlain, in the early Muslim world, which evolved to fulfil various functions, often serving as chief ministers or enjoying dictatorial powers. The post appeared under the Umayyad Caliphate, but gained in influence and prestige in the more settled court of the Abbasids, under whom it ranked as one of the senior offices of the state, alongside the vizier. From the early caliphates, the post spread to other areas under Muslim dominion: in al-Andalus the hajib was always superior to the vizier and by the 10th century had come to wield enormous power as a de facto chancellor; in the eastern dynasties, the Samanids, Buyids and Ghaznavids, the title acquired a mainly military role; under the Seljuks, Ilkhanids and Timurids it reverted to its role as a court official; in Fatimid Egypt, the chief hajib, styled sahib al-bab ('Master of the Gate') or hajib al-hujjab ('chamberlain of chamberlains, head chamberlain') was also an important official; under the Mamluks, they acquired important judicial duties.

== Origin ==
The office has its origins in pre-Islamic Arabia, where doorkeeping (ḥijāba, "concealing") was one of the duties of domestic slaves or clients (mawālī, singular mawlā) of an Arab household. Modern scholars have traditionally regarded the office of hajib in a courtly setting as an innovation of the Umayyad Caliphate (661–750), but in reality it is widely attested in the sources for the pre-Islamic Ghassanid and Lakhmid kings, Muhammad, Sajah, various early Muslim provincial governors and political figures, including all early caliphs and anti-caliphs such as Hasan ibn Ali and Ibn al-Zubayr. However, in Arabic historiography, their existence is often obscured or euphemistically paraphrased, since the office was ill regarded in early Muslim society, with its strong egalitarian tendencies.

Indeed, the formalization of the hajib is part of the consolidation and stratification process of the Muslim society after the early Muslim conquests, when the ruler began to be separated from the ruled, and surrounded by an increasingly elaborate ceremonial, borrowed in large part from Sassanid Persian practic.

== Umayyad and Abbasid caliphates ==
In the Umayyad and early Abbasid periods, up to the early 9th century, most of the occupants of the office were still mawālī. During this time, the hajib still occupied a lower rung in the court hierarchy than the Arab aristocracy or the great ministers of state. His main duties were those of a master of ceremonies, organizing and supervising caliphal audiences, and bringing visitors to the caliph's presence. He was also head of the palace staff, and might sometimes be employed by the caliph as a trusted agent in eliminating certain of the caliph's subjects.

With the rise of the Abbasids, the mawālī gained in prestige at court, despite their often very humble origin. With the introduction of the vizier as the head of government, a kind of separation of powers emerged, where the vizier—usually drawn from the secretarial class—headed the administration, while the hajib controlled courtly affairs. The holders of the two offices often vied for control of the administration; thus the hajibs al-Rabi' ibn Yunus and his son al-Fadl ibn al-Rabi' both became viziers after the dismissal of their rivals who previously held the office. This division and the rivalry between the two offices was strengthened during the "Samarra period", when the office of hajib began to be occupied by Turkish slave soldiers (ghilman, sing. ghulam), whose "background, formation, and interests differed starkly from those of the bureaucratic vizier". Under Caliph al-Mutawakkil, the Turkish hajib Itakh served as chief minister, since the Caliph did not nominate a vizier.

In the late 9th century, the position of the vizier was strengthened, as the powers of the office became more formalized and he emerged as the head of the civilian administration, underpinned by a highly specialized secretarial class. Another contender for authority also emerged in the commander-in-chief of the army. However, the hajib remained a powerful official, especially during palace coups, as he controlled a part of the caliphal bodyguard, notably the Maṣāffiyya. Under al-Muqtadir (r. 908–932), the hajib Nasr al-Qushuri became a major power-broker, since he occupied his post continuously from 908–929, whereas the viziers changed rapidly during this period. He not only had a role in the selection of several viziers, but also was responsible for arresting them when they were dismissed.

After 929, the commanders-in-chief supplanted the viziers in power and began dominating the government, becoming the main rivals of the hajib, who now also assumed a more military character. Thus the hajib Yaqut had his son Muhammad ibn Yaqut appointed sahib al-shurta in his rivalry with the commander-in-chief Mu'nis al-Muzaffar, before they were both dismissed at the latter's insistence. Under al-Qahir (r. 932–934) the hajib Ibn Yalbaq was a soldier who tried to impose his pro-Shi'a beliefs on the caliph. Under ar-Radi, Muhammad ibn Yaqut made a comeback, combining the positions of hajib and commander-in-chief, but despite their dominant position in Baghdad, the lack of financial resources meant that the hajib could not compete with provincial governors who controlled the sources of revenue. Thus in 936 it was Ibn Ra'iq who was selected as amir al-umara, and became the de facto ruler of the caliphate. Having lost the struggle for power, the chamberlains were recompensed with an increase in titulature: from 941, the head chamberlain was known as hajib al-hujab ("chamberlain of chamberlains").

== Al-Andalus ==
In the Umayyad Emirate of Cordoba and in the succeeding Caliphate of Cordoba, the hajib was from the outset the most senior minister of the state, at the head of his own court (majlis), where he received petitioners and messengers. The hajib was the chief aide of the emir or caliph and the head of the administration, supervising the three main branches into which it was divided: the royal household, the chancery, and the financial department. Several of the holders of the office also commanded armies. Unlike the Islamic East, the title of vizier was given to lower-ranking counsellors tasked with various matters, and subordinate to the hajib; the latter was almost always chosen from the viziers. A number of ordinary hajibs was tasked with the doorkeeping duties and directing court ceremonies.

Notable hajibs were Abd al-Karim ibn Abd al-Wahid ibn Mughith, who served in the post in the successive reigns of Hisham I (r. 788–796), al-Hakam I (r. 796–822), and Abd al-Rahman II (r. 822–852); the famously incorruptible Isa ibn Shuhayd, who served under Abd al-Rahman II and into the reign of Muhammad I (r. 852–886); and finally Almanzor, who as the hajib assumed quasi-regal authority and was the de facto ruler of the Caliphate of Cordoba 978 until his death in 1002.

Following the collapse of the caliphate and the political fragmentation of al-Andalus into the competing taifa kingdoms, some of the taifa rulers, who were not members of the Umayyad dynasty and could not claim the title of caliph, imitated Almanzor and used the title of hajib, rather than malik ("king"), thus maintaining the fiction that they were simply representatives of the long-vanished caliph.

== Eastern Islamic dynasties ==
Many of the dynasties that emerged in the eastern Islamic world after the fragmentation of the Abbasid Caliphate in the mid 9th–10th centuries modelled their administrative and courtly practices on the Abbasids. Thus the title of hajib was still used for masters of ceremonies and intermediaries between the ruler to the bureaucracy, but also as a military rank given to generals and provincial governors.

Thus in the Samanid dynasty (819–999), which also relied on a Turkic-dominated ghilman corps, the title was originally restricted to the ruler's household, but by the mid-10th century had come to acquire a military role: the "chief" or "great hajib" (al-hajib al-kabir, hajib al-hudjjab, hajib-i buzurg) was the second man in the state, combining in his person the functions of head of the palace and commander-in-chief. Ordinary hajibs served as generals and, occasionally, provincial governors. According to Nizam al-Mulk's account on the training of ghilman, a ghulam could rise through the ranks to withaq-bashi ("tent leader"), khayl-bashi ("detachment commander"), before attaining the rank of hijab, and then become amir of a province. The Samanid practice was emulated by the successor Ghaznavid dynasty (977–1186) as well, with the hajib-i buzurg as the commander-in-chief in the Sultan's stead, commanding several ordinary hajibs as generals; all of them were distinguished by a black cloak, a specific type of belt, and a two-pointed cap. However, unlike the Samanids, the Ghaznavid hajib-i buzurg did not exercise direct control over the palace administration, which was in the hands of the wakil-i khass, nor over the palace guard, which was entrusted to the salar-i ghulaman-i saray. In the Buyid emirates (934–1062), which lacked the sophisticated central government of the Abbasid type, hajib was exclusively a military title. The account of Miskawayh implies that here too there was a succession of ranks, from naqib to qa'id and then to hajib.

In the Seljuk Empire (1037–1194), however, the mainly military role of the chief hajib receded somewhat, although, given the military character of the Seljuk court, its occupant was still a Turkish commander (amir), with a staff mostly drawn from ghilman. The amir hajib might still participate in campaigns and command parts of an army, but he was once again mostly a court official, commanding generals being designated as sipahsalar or isfahsalar. The office's role under the Seljuks is described in the writings of Nizam al-Mulk and Muhammad bin Ali Rawandi. Anachronistically ascribing its existence to the practices of the Sasanian court, the latter writes that the hajib was the official responsible for administering punishment. The amir hajib was the highest-ranking court official, and apart from ceremonies and protocol, he was also responsible for military discipline. Under Muhammad I Tapar, the amir hajib is recorded as acting as the intermediary between the Seljuk sultan and his officials, including the vizier. Nizam al-Mulk also mentions the existence of a hajib-i dargah, responsible for ceremonies and order at court; it is unclear whether that was a distinct office from that of amir hajib. From the names of amir hajibs provided by Rawandi, the office was not hereditary—with only one exception: Ali Bar, hajib of Muhammad I, was succeeded by his son Muhammad, under Mahmud II—and was often held by some of the most powerful amir of the day, while others are rather unknown. There were also a number of junior chamberlains with the simple title of hajib in the Seljuk court. In time, the most important generals and provincial governors, as well as other prominent men of the realm, also acquired hajibs in their retinues. These were not always military men.

Under the Ilkhanids (1256–1357), the hajib was again a chamberlain, although both in the royal court as well as in the lesser provincial courts these men were drawn from the military class. The hajibs remained court officials under the Timurids, while under the Safavids the chief chamberlain was known as ishik-aqasi bashi and held the duties of a master of ceremonies analogous to the hajib-i dargah.

== Egypt and the Levant ==
In the Fatimid Caliphate, the hajibs were chamberlains, with the chief chamberlain known as the "Lord of the Gate" (sahib al-bab) or, occasionally, as "Chief Chamberlain" (hajib al-hujjab). Furthermore, the writer Ibn al-Sayrfi mentions the existence of a hajib al-diwan, tasked with preventing unauthorized visitors and preserving state secrets.

The military hajib was introduced to the Levant by the Seljuks, and this model was followed by the Zengids and the Ayyubids after them. However, the use of the title hajib for chamberlains continued in Egypt until the 13th century.

== Sources ==
- D. Sourdel, Le vizirat 'Abbaside, Damascus 1959-1960.
- El Cheikh, Nadia Maria (2013). "The chamberlains". Crisis and Continuity at the Abbasid Court: Formal and Informal Politics in the Caliphate of al-Muqtadir (295-320/908-32). Leiden: BRILL. pp. 145–163. ISBN 978-90-04-25271-4.
- Kennedy, Hugh (1996). Muslim Spain and Portugal. A political history of al-Andalus. London: Longman. ISBN 978-0-582-49515-9.
- Morris, Ian D. (2017). "Ḥājib". In Fleet, Kate; Krämer, Gudrun; Matringe, Denis; Nawas, John; Rowson, Everett (eds.). Encyclopaedia of Islam (3rd ed.). Brill Online. doi:10.1163/1573-3912_ei3_COM_30196. ISSN 1873-9830.
- Sourdel, D.; Bosworth, C.E. & Lambton, A.K.S. (1971). "Ḥādjib". In Lewis, B.; Ménage, V. L.; Pellat, Ch. & Schacht, J. (eds.). The Encyclopaedia of Islam, Second Edition. Volume III: H–Iram. Leiden: E. J. Brill. pp. 45–49. OCLC 495469525.
