= Al-Fadl ibn Sahl =

Persian Abbasid vizier and official (died 818)

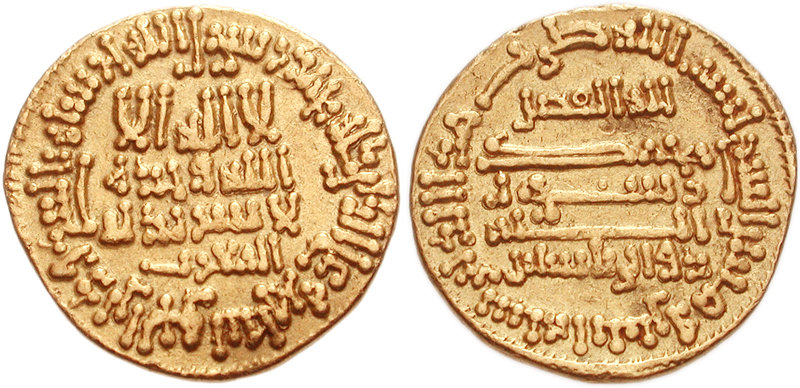
- Abbasid gold dinar, naming Caliph al-Ma'mun and al-Fadl, with his title Dhu 'l-Ri'āsatayn
- Born: c. 770; Khurasan, Abbasid Caliphate
- Died: 13 February 818; Sarakhs, Abbasid Caliphate (now Iran)
- Occupations: Abbasid vizier and official
- Years active: c. 813 – 817
- Era: Abbasid
- Father: Sahl
- Relatives: Hasan (brother); Buran (niece)

Abu l-Abbas al-Fadl ibn Sahl ibn Zadhanfarukh al-Sarakhsi (Arabic: أبو العباس الفضل بن سهل بن زادانفروخ السرخسي, romanized: Abu’l-ʿAbbās al-Faḍl ibn Sahl ibn Zādānfarrūkh as-Sarakhsī; died 818), titled Dhu 'l-Ri'āsatayn (Arabic: ذُو الرَّياسَتَيْن, "the man of the two headships"), was a famous Persian vizier of the Abbasid era in Khurasan, who served under Caliph al-Ma'mun (r. 813–832). He played a crucial role in the civil war between al-Ma'mun and his brother al-Amin (r. 809–813), and was the vizier of the Abbasid Caliphate until 817.

== Family ==
Fadl's father Sahl was a Zoroastrian from Kufa, who later converted to Islam and joined the Barmakids. At the urging of Barmakid Yahya ibn Khalid, Fadl also converted to Islam, probably in 806, and entered the service of the Caliph Harun al-Rashid and his son al-Ma'mun.

Fadl realized very early on that after Harun al-Rashid's death, his throne would be disputed between his sons, and urged al-Ma'mun, the son of a Persian concubine, to accompany his father on his expedition to Khurasan, to secure a power-base in Iranian lands. When the events unfolded as accurately as Fadl had predicted them, al-Ma'mun made him his chief adviser and right hand during the civil war with his brother al-Amin.

== Political career ==
After defeating al-Amin, al-Ma'mun became the new Caliph throughout the eastern Islamic world, primarily the Iranian lands, and Fadl was appointed vizier and Emir of these areas. Because of his local role as civil and military leader he received the honorary title of ذو الرئاستين, meaning "the dual leadership of violence". In addition, he was rewarded with immense riches and an inheritable estate. Fadl's brother, al-Hasan ibn Sahl was also appointed Minister of Finance.

Even though he emerged victorious during the Fourth Fitna, al-Ma'mun continued to face several revolts and a considerable resistance from the Arab aristocracy, especially in Baghdad and Syria. According to the historian al-Azraqi and Ibn Babuya, Fadl led several campaigns in Khurasan and the neighboring areas, and there the local rulers faced decisive defeats, including the Karluk Turks (whose leaders had to flee) and the Kabul Shahi. The significance of this victory can hardly be underestimated, since Fadl not only secured the eastern flank of the empire, but also for the influx of new mercenaries and military slaves made for al-Ma'mun's army.

A significant turning point in the history of the Abbasid Caliphate was the nomination of a Shiite Imam named Ali al-Ridha as al-Ma'mun's successor. The appointment of Ali al-Ridha as his successor, the general pro-Shiite attitude of the Caliph and the fact that al-Ma'mun continued reside in the Merv, a prominent city populated by Persians, and not in the Arab heartland of the Caliphate in Iraq, allowed the enemies of the Caliph, he and his consultants were seen as Persophiles and branded as "anti-Arab". Fadl was accused of secretly a Shiite takeover of the caliphate and trying to restore the Sasanian Empire. According to some sources, Fadl later rejected a large sum of money from the Caliph and resigned from his office to live a quiet and ascetic life.

== Death ==
On 13 February 818, Fadl was mysteriously found dead in a bathroom in Sarakhs, in northern Khurasan. According to various reports, he was circa 41–60 years old when he died. According to some rumors, the caliph himself had ordered his assassination. Within a short time later Ali Al-Ridha also died. Most modern historians agree that it was al-Ma'mun who ordered the death of both men, despite his deep friendship and solidarity to them (with whom he was related by marriage), politics and the unity of the caliphate.

Fadl was seen as a dynamic, sometimes violent and authoritarian politician, but was not selfish or greedy.

== See also ==
- List of Iranian scholars
- List of Persian poets and authors
- Iranian Intermezzo

== Sources ==
- Bosworth, C. E. (1999). "FAŻL, b. SAHL b. Zādānfarrūḵ". Encyclopaedia Iranica, Online Edition.
- Kennedy, Hugh (2004) [1986]. The Prophet and the Age of the Caliphates: The Islamic Near East from the 6th to the 11th Century (Second ed.). Harlow: Longman. ISBN 978-0-582-40525-7.
- Sourdel, Dominique (1965). "al-Faḍl b. Sahl b. Zad̲h̲ānfarūk̲h̲". In Lewis, B.; Pellat, Ch. & Schacht, J. (eds.). The Encyclopaedia of Islam, Second Edition. Volume II: C–G. Leiden: E. J. Brill. pp. 731–732. OCLC 495469475.
