= Al-Husayn ibn Isma'il al-Mus'abi =

Governor of Fars and Police Chief

Governor of Fars
- In office 850–861
- Monarch: Al-Mutawakkil
- Preceded by: Muhammad ibn Ibrahim

Chief of security (Shurtah) in Baghdad
- In office 870–885
- Monarch: Al-Mu'tamid

Personal details
- Born: Abbasid Caliphate
- Died: 885 Baghdad, Abbasid Caliphate
- Parent: Isma'il ibn Ibrahim ibn Mus'ab

Military service
- Allegiance: Abbasid Caliphate
- Years of service: 861–867
- Battles/wars: Fifth Fitna

Al-Husayn ibn Isma'il ibn Ibrahim ibn Mus'ab (Arabic: الحسين بن إسماعيل بن إبراهيم بن مصعب, died November 886) was a ninth century army commander in the service of the Abbasid Caliphate. He was particularly active during the period known as the Anarchy at Samarra (861–870).

== Career ==
A member of the Mus'abid family, al-Husayn was a blood relation of the Tahirid family, and he is occasionally referred to in the sources by the nisba of "al-Tahiri." During the caliphate of al-Mutawakkil (r. 847–861) he was appointed as governor of Fars by his cousin Muhammad ibn Ishaq ibn Ibrahim in 850, and was responsible for putting to death his uncle Muhammad ibn Ibrahim al-Mus'abi, the previous holder of that position. In 858 he is mentioned as being a member of the al-Mutawakkil's bodyguard (haras) when the caliph made his journey to Damascus, and in the following year he is reported to have been appointed as chamberlain (hajib) upon the death of Ibrahim ibn al-Hasan ibn Sahl.

Following the death of al-Mutawakkil in 861, al-Husayn returned to Baghdad and became a commander for the governor of the city, his second cousin Muhammad ibn Abdallah ibn Tahir. In 864 he was selected by Muhammad to lead an army against the Alid Yahya ibn Umar, who had rebelled in Kufa, and after a short campaign he was successful in defeating and killing Yahya in battle. During the civil war of 865–866 between the rival caliphs al-Musta'in and al-Mu'tazz he played a prominent role as one of Muhammad's lieutenants in defending Baghdad against a yearlong siege, having initially commanded the defense of the Shammasiyyah Gate on the east side of the city and later helping to repulse an assault by the besieging Samarran army. In the summer of that year he was charged with recapturing the town of Anbar from the forces of al-Mu'tazz, but despite having a great number of troops he was twice repulsed with heavy losses, causing Muhammad to publicly chastise both him and his men as a result.

After the end of the war al-Husayn appears to have remained in the service of Muhammad until the latter's death in 867, and he participated in the suppression of a troop riot in Baghdad in 866. Under Muhammad's successor Ubaydallah ibn Abdallah ibn Tahir he was placed in charge of the double bridge of Baghdad and the districts of Qatrabbul, Maskin and Anbar and additionally held command over the non-Arab and Shakiriyyah troops. He had a much more tense relationship with the next governor Sulayman ibn Abdallah ibn Tahir, who stripped him of his positions and imprisoned his subordinates, and a dispute between him and several other Baghdadi commanders against Sulayman's officer Muhammad ibn Aws quickly escalated into a spate of violent clashes in 869.

In 870 al-Husayn is mentioned as overseeing the seasonal festival (mawsim) during the pilgrimage of that year. He later held the office of chief of security (shurta) of Baghdad on behalf of Muhammad ibn Tahir in 885, during which time he protected a local monastery from being destroyed by a mob.
