= Ibn Ibrahim =

Ibn Ibrahim is a patronymic part of a full personal name in Islamic cultures, an Arabic patronymic, or nasab meaning "son of Ibrahim". Notable people with this patronymic include:

- Abdallah ibn Ibrahim
- Abdallah ibn Ishaq ibn Ibrahim
- Abdallah ibn Muhammad ibn Ibrahim al-Zaynabi
- Abu al-Abbas Ahmad ibn Ibrahim
- Abu Abdullah Muhamed Ibn Ibrahim Ibn Bassal
- Abu Bakr Ahmad ibn Ibrahim al-Madhara'i
- Abu Iqal al-Aghlab ibn Ibrahim
- Abu Salim Ali ibn Ibrahim
- Abu’l Fath Omar ibn Ibrahim al-Khayyam, or Omar Khayyam
- Abu'l Hasan Ahmad ibn Ibrahim Al-Uqlidisi
- Ahmad ibn Ibrahim al-Ghazi
- Ahmad ibn Ibrahim al-Naysaburi
- Al-Abbas ibn Ibrahim as-Samlali
- Alī ibn Ibrāhīm Ibn al-Shāṭir
- Ali Ibn Ibrahim Qomi
- Farid al-Din Muhammad ibn Ibrahim Attar
- Hatim ibn Ibrahim
- Ishaq ibn Ibrahim al-Mawsili
- Ishaq ibn Ibrahim al-Mus'abi
- Ismail ibn Ibrahim
- Muhammad ibn Ibrahim Al ash-Sheikh
- Muḥammad ibn Ibrāhīm al-Fazārī
- Muḥammad ibn Ibrāhīm ibn al-Akfani
- Muhammad Ibn Ibrahim Ibn Jafar al-Numani
- Muhammad ibn Ibrahim al-Mus'abi
- Muhammad ibn Ishaq ibn Ibrahim
- Muhammad Ibn Ismail Ibn Ibrahim Ibn al-Mughirah Ibn Bardizbah al-Bukhari
- Muhammad Hayyat ibn Ibrahim al-Sindhi
- Musafir ibn Ibrahim II
- Sa'd Zaghloul Pasha ibn Ibrahim
- Sidi ibn Ibrahim al-Taras
- Umar ibn Ibrahim ibn Waqid al-Umari
- Yahya Ibn Ibrahim
- Ya'ish ibn Ibrahim al-Umawi
- Yaqub ibn Ibrahim al-Ansari
- Yāˈqub ibn Isḥāq ibn Ibrāhīm
- Ziyadat Allah I ibn Ibrahim
