= Muhammad ibn Abdallah ibn Tahir =

Abbasid governor and police chief of Baghdad from 851 to 867

Chief of security (Shurtah) in Baghdad Governor of Baghdad
- In office 851–867
- Monarchs: al-Mutawakkil al-Muntasir al-Musta'in al-Mu'tazz
- Preceded by: Muhammad ibn Ishaq
- Succeeded by: Ubaydallah ibn Abdallah

Governor of Medina and Mecca
- In office 862–867
- Monarchs: al-Musta'in, al-Mu'tazz
- Preceded by: Ali ibn al-Husayn ibn Isma'il
- Succeeded by: Ishaq ibn Muhammad ibn Yusuf al-Ja'fari

Personal details
- Born: 824/5 (AH 209)
- Died: November 867
- Parent: Abdallah ibn Tahir

Abu'l-Abbas Muhammad ibn Abdallah ibn Tahir (Arabic: محمد بن عبدالله بن طاهر) (824/5 – November 867) was a Tahirid family member, who served the Abbasid Caliphate as governor and chief of police (sahib al-shurta) of Baghdad from 851 until his death, during a particularly troubled period in the city's history, which included its siege during the civil war of 865–866, in which he played a major role. He also served in the 860s as governor of Baghdad, Mecca and Medina, and was noted as a scholar, a poet and a patron of artists and scholars.

== Life ==
Muhammad was born in 824/5 (AH 209). He was the son of Abdallah ibn Tahir al-Khurasani, who after a distinguished military career became military governor (wali al-harb wa'l-shurta) of Baghdad, before going on to rule a vast viceroyalty in the East, comprising central and eastern Iran, from 830 to 845; according to C.E. Bosworth, he was "perhaps the greatest of the Tahirids". Baghdad and the family's interests in Iraq remained in the hands of his cousin, Ishaq ibn Ibrahim and his heirs. In the East, Abdallah was succeeded by his son Tahir, but in Iraq, the family's position was far less stable, as the Tahirids there quarrelled among themselves. As a result, in 851 the Caliph al-Mutawakkil called Muhammad ibn Abadallah from Khurasan to Iraq, where he assumed the governorships of Baghdad, the Sawad and Fars, while according to the 10th-century Egyptian scholar al-Shabushti, he also served as the caliphs' chamberlain (hajib).

Shortly after the accession of al-Musta'in in 862, Tahir ibn Abdallah died. Musta'in proposed that Muhammad take up his brother's viceroyalty in the East, but he refused, and Tahir's son Muhammad was named instead. Muhammad ibn Abdallah was reconfirmed in his old offices, and received in addition the governorship of Mecca and Medina. The next years were troubled for the Caliphate as it entered a period of domestic instability that paralysed its government. Riots broke out in Baghdad in 863 on the news of a major Byzantine victory against the Muslims, which necessitated the intervention of Turkish troops before they could be suppressed, while in 864, Muhammad ibn Abdallah had to suppress an Alid uprising that broke out in Kufa under Yahya ibn Umar, who defeated the first army sent against him before being encircled and killed by the general Husayn ibn Isma'il in August. Iraq Ajami, along with the provinces on the southern shore of the Caspian Sea, also came under Muhammad ibn Abdallah's jurisdiction. In the latter, Gurgan and Tabaristan, he had appointed his brother Sulayman, whose administration was so oppressive that the local people rose in revolt in 864 and invited another Alid, Hasan ibn Zayd, to lead them. Although caliphal forces managed to defeat the initial uprising and drive Hasan and his supporters to the mountains of Daylam, in the early 870s he managed to recover Tabaristan, establishing an independent Alid dynasty in the region. In Arabia too, Alid elements used the turmoil in Iraq to rise in revolt: in 865, an Alid named Isma'il ibn Yusuf plundered both Mecca and Medina, killing so many of the pilgrims who had gathered there for the hajj, that he was nicknamed al-Saffak, "the Bloodshedder".

In the same year, the civil strife in the Abbasid court reached Baghdad itself: in February 865, Musta'in left Samarra along with the Turkish generals Wasif and Bugha the Younger and sought refuge in Baghdad. Back in Samarra, the rest of the Turkic military establishment raised al-Mu'tazz to the throne, and under the command of the new caliph's brother, Abu Ahmad, marched on Baghdad. The siege of Baghdad by the Samarran troops lasted for almost the entire year, and Muhammad ibn Abdallah led the defence in support of al-Musta'in. Gradually however he despaired of any prospects for victory, and began negotiations with Abu Ahmad. He was accused of treason and almost lynched by the city's defenders, and was saved only by the intervention of al-Musta'in. Eventually, al-Musta'in agreed to surrender and abdicate in favour of Mu'tazz in January 866. Muhammad remained in his position and held his offices until his death in November 867.

Among contemporaries, he was also known as a scholar and poet. He related hadiths, and was a patron of artists like the singer Ahmad ibn Yahya al-Makki, called Zunayn, who wrote his Kitab mujarrad fi'l-aghani ("Book of Choice Songs") for him. He also had a "lively interest in grammar and philology" (Bosworth), with the prominent grammarians al-Mubarrad and Tha'lab frequenting his circle and engaging in disputations in his presence.

== Sources ==
- Bosworth, C.E. (1975). "The Ṭāhirids and Ṣaffārids". In Frye, Richard N. (ed.). The Cambridge History of Iran: From the Arab Invasion to the Saljuqs. Vol. 4. Cambridge: Cambridge University Press. pp. 90–135. ISBN 0-521-20093-8.
- Bosworth, C.E. (2002). "MOḤAMMAD b. ʿABD-ALLAH b. ṬĀHER". Encyclopædia Iranica.
- Kennedy, Hugh (2004) [1986]. The Prophet and the Age of the Caliphates: The Islamic Near East from the 6th to the 11th Century (Second ed.). Harlow: Longman. ISBN 978-0-582-40525-7.
- Le Strange, Guy (1900). Baghdad During the Abbasid Caliphate. From Contemporary Arabic and Persian Sources. Oxford: Clarendon Press. OCLC 257810905.
- Zetterstéen, K.V. & Bosworth, C.E. (1993). "Muḥammad b. ʿAbd Allāh". In Bosworth, C. E.; van Donzel, E.; Heinrichs, W. P. & Pellat, Ch. (eds.). The Encyclopaedia of Islam, Second Edition. Volume VII: Mif–Naz. Leiden: E. J. Brill. p. 390. ISBN 978-90-04-09419-2.

| Preceded by Abdallah ibn Ishaq ibn Ibrahim | Tahirid governor of Baghdad; 851–867 | Succeeded by Ubaydallah ibn Abdallah ibn Tahir |
