= 'Ali ibn al-Husayn ibn Quraysh =

Muslim 9th century military commander

Ali ibn al-Husayn ibn Quraysh ibn Shibl
- علي بن الحسين بن قريش بن شبل
- Other name: al-Bukhari
- Occupation: Military commander

'Ali ibn al-Husayn ibn Quraysh ibn Shibl (Arabic: علي بن الحسين بن قريش بن شبل) (also known as al-Bukhari) was a Muslim military commander who gained control of the Abbasid province of Fars in the mid-860s. He ruled Fars until 869, when he was defeated and captured by Ya'qub ibn al-Layth, the Saffarid amir of Sistan.

== Career prior to 868 ==
A number of Muslim historians, including al-Ya'qubi and al-Tabari, wrote about 'Ali, but their accounts are not identical.

=== According to al-Ya'qubi ===
'Ali first came to power in Fars in 863, when the provincial army revolted under his leadership. Fars at the time was one of several provinces that had been assigned to the Tahirid family, who held the important governorships of Khurasan and Baghdad. In response to the revolt, the governor of Baghdad, Muhammad ibn 'Abdallah appointed his fellow Tahirid 'Abdallah ibn Ishaq as governor of Fars and sent him to pacify the province. When 'Abdallah arrived, 'Ali at first submitted to him and was assigned to fight against a group of Kharijites near the border with Kerman. Soon, however, the army became disgruntled with 'Abdallah, who refused to pay their salaries; as a result, 'Ali was able to convince the troops to support him in a new uprising. 'Ali returned and attacked 'Abdallah, forced him to retreat and seized his possessions. The army of Fars then made 'Ali their amir.

=== According to al-Tabari ===
Al-Tabari's chronicle notes that, in the year 864, the army of Fars revolted against 'Abdallah ibn Ishaq, looted his residence and forced him to flee; however it does not explicitly name 'Ali as being involved with this event. It does not mention 'Ali until the events of 868 and 869, at which point he was serving as the caliphal governor of Fars; it also describes 'Ali as having previously been in the service of the Tahirids.

== War with Ya'qub ibn al-Layth ==
In 868, war broke out between 'Ali and the amir of Sistan, Ya'qub ibn al-Layth. According to al-Tabari, 'Ali had written to the caliph al-Mu'tazz and requested that the governorship of Kerman be given to him. Kerman, like Fars, had been assigned to the Tahirids, but 'Ali claimed that Tahirid misrule had weakened their control over the province. According to the narrative, the central authorities did not trust him, but agreed to appoint him as governor of Kerman. At the same time, however, they also wrote to Ya'qub and gave him the same appointment, in the hopes that the two amirs would fight against each other and that one of them would be defeated.

Upon receiving his appointment, Ya'qub departed from Sistan to Kerman with the intention of establishing his authority there, when 'Ali learned of Ya'qub's advance, he dispatched an army under the command of Tawq ibn al-Mughallis to Kerman to defend the province. Tawq reached Kerman before Ya'qub, and for a while the two sides avoided engaging each other. Eventually, however, Ya'qub was able to defeat and capture Tawq. His victory allowed him to secure his hold over Kerman and it became another one of his provinces.

When 'Ali learned about Tawq's defeat, he feared that Ya'qub would press his advantage and invade Fars. He therefore mobilized his troops and set up his camp just outside Shiraz. When Ya'qub entered Fars, he and his army advanced to Shiraz and lined up to face 'Ali's forces. According to the biographer Ibn Khallikan, the resulting battle took place on April 21, 869; during the course of the fighting, Ya'qub's army broke through the enemy's front line, and soon 'Ali's men were abandoning the field in a panic and retreating into Shiraz. 'Ali was captured and brought before Ya'qub, who ordered him bound and confiscated the possessions in his camp. Ya'qub then entered Shiraz and allowed his troops to plunder the residences of 'Ali and his partisans. After remaining there for a short time, Ya'qub abandoned Fars and returned to Sistan, and took with him 'Ali and a number of his commanders. Following Ya'qub's departure, the central authorities sent al-Harith ibn Sima al-Sharabi to govern Fars.

'Ali's date of death is not mentioned by the sources. Ibn Khallikan, however, states that he was tortured on the orders of Ya'qub to the point that he went insane, and was ultimately imprisoned in a fortress in Kerman.
