= Ubaydallah ibn Abdallah ibn Tahir =

Governor of Baghdad and military officer (c.838–913)

Governor of Baghdad (first period)
- In office 867 - 869
- Monarch: Al-Mu'tazz
- Preceded by: Muhammad ibn Abdallah
- Succeeded by: Sulayman ibn Abdallah

Governor of Baghdad (second period)
- In office 879 - 885
- Monarch: Al-Mutamid
- Succeeded by: Muhammad ibn Tahir

Governor of Baghdad (third period)
- In office 889 - 891
- Monarch: al-Mutamid
- Succeeded by: None

Personal details
- Born: 838
- Died: May 913 Baghdad, Abbasid Caliphate
- Children: Ahmad ibn Ubaydallah
- Parent: Abdallah ibn Tahir

Abu Ahmad Ubaydallah ibn Abdallah ibn Tahir (Arabic: أبو أحمد عبيد الله بن عبد الله بن طاهر, c. 838 – May 913) was a ninth century Tahirid official and military officer. He was the last major Tahirid to hold high office, having served as the governor of Baghdad at various points between 867 and 891.

== Career ==
Ubaydallah was the son of Abdallah ibn Tahir, the governor of Khurasan from 828 to 845. During the civil war of 865–866 he was present in Baghdad, and throughout the siege of the city he served in a military capacity under his brother Muhammad ibn Abdallah ibn Tahir, who as governor commanded the overall defense against the besiegers. At the end of the war, he was responsible for transferring the signet, cloak and scepter of the defeated caliph al-Musta'in (r. 862–866) to the victor al-Mu'tazz (r. 866–869).

Upon Muhammad's death in November 867, Ubaydallah assumed the governorship of Baghdad as his brother's designated successor, and he quickly received formal confirmation from al-Mu'tazz. During his first term as governor, he was responsible for hunting down the sons of the Turkish officer Bugha al-Sharabi following the latter's execution in 868. Before long, however, he was beset by fiscal problems which made it difficult for him to pay the salaries of the troops in the city, and was eventually compelled to surrender the governorship to his brother Sulayman ibn Abdallah ibn Tahir in 869.

Following Sulayman's death in late 879, Ubaydallah was again appointed as head of security (shurtah) in Baghdad, this time as deputy to the Saffarid Amr ibn al-Layth, who had been granted that position by the central government. He probably held the governorship until 885, when a reversal in caliphal policy toward the Saffarids resulted in 'Amr being formally dismissed from office. In August 889 he was restored to the shurtah following a rapprochement between the central government and 'Amr, but in 891 the Abbasid prince Abu al-Abbas ibn al-Muwaffaq (the future caliph al-Mu'tadid, r. 892–902) appointed his own page Badr al-Mu'tadidi to that position instead.

During the reign of al-Mu'tadid Ubaydallah fell into a period of hardship, and in his last years he relied on financial assistance from prominent individuals such as al-Muktafi, Ibn al-Mu'tazz, and Ahmad and Ali of the Banu'l-Furat. He died in Baghdad in May 913.

== Culture ==
Aside from his political career, 'Ubdaydallah was renowned for his extensive cultural patronage and expertise, leading the historian Clifford Edmund Bosworth to call him "the most celebrated of his family in the literary and artistic fields." He was considered to be proficient in adab literature, poetry, grammar, history, geometry, and music, and his skills in these fields were praised by authors such as Abu al-Faraj al-Isfahani and al-Shabushti. As a musician he was known to have composed several melodies for prominent signers of the time, although he was too proud to openly take credit for his pieces and attributed them to a singing girl that he owned instead. He also enjoyed a longstanding relationship with the poet Ibn al-Rumi, and was one of the largest dedicatees of the latter's poetry.

Ubaydallah was the author of several works, although they are now believed to be lost. Among his writings were a book about poems and poets (Kitab al-ishara fi akhbar al-shi'r), a treatise on government (Risala fi al-siyasa al-mulukiyya), a collection of letters sent to him by the Abbasid prince and poet Ibn al-Mu'tazz, a book on melody and the background behind the composition of well-known songs (Kitab al-adab al-rafi'a), and a work on rhetoric (Kitab al-bara'a wa al-fasaha). His poetry was also organized into a collection (diwan), and many of his verses were transmitted by later writers.

== Notes ==
Preceded by Muhammad ibn Abdallah ibn Tahir	Tahirid governor of Baghdad; 867–869	Succeeded by Sulayman ibn Abdallah ibn Tahir
Preceded by Sulayman ibn Abdallah ibn Tahir	Tahirid governor of Baghdad; 879–885	Succeeded by Muhammad ibn Tahir ibn Abdallah
Preceded by Muhammad ibn Tahir ibn Abdallah	Tahirid governor of Baghdad; 889–891	Succeeded by Badr al-Mu'tadidi as non-Tahirid governor
