= Abdallah ibn Ishaq ibn Ibrahim =

Governor of Baghdad and Police chief

Chief of security (Shurtah) in Baghdad Governor of Baghdad
- In office 851
- Monarch: Al-Mutawakkil
- Preceded by: Muhammad ibn Ishaq
- Succeeded by: Muhammad ibn Abdallah ibn Tahir

Governor of Fars
- In office 863
- Monarch: Al-Musta'in
- Succeeded by: None

Personal details
- Parent: Ishaq ibn Ibrahim al-Mus'abi

Abdallah ibn Ishaq ibn Ibrahim (Arabic: عبد الله بن إسحاق بن إبراهيم) was a Mus'abid official in the service of the Abbasid Caliphate. He was briefly the governor of Baghdad in 851, and the governor of Fars in c. 863.

== Career ==
Abdallah was a member of the Mus'abid family, a collateral branch of the Tahirid dynasty. Following the death of Muhammad ibn Ishaq ibn Ibrahim in July 851, 'Abdallah succeeded him as governor of Baghdad and chief of security (shurtah) of the Sawad, but he quickly alienated his taxation officials by dealing with them in a harsh manner. In that same year he lost his position to Muhammad ibn Abdallah ibn Tahir, who arrived in October from Khurasan.

In ca. 863 Abdallah was appointed by Muhammad to act as his governor of Fars. While serving in that province, he withheld the pay of the local soldiers, which provoked them into rebelling against him and transferring their allegiance to 'Ali ibn al-Husayn ibn Quraysh. Lacking the means to counter the revolt, Abdallah was forced to abandon Fars and return to Baghdad.

== Notes ==
Preceded by Muhammad ibn Ishaq ibn Ibrahim	Mus'abid governor of Baghdad; 851	Succeeded by Muhammad ibn Abdallah ibn Tahir
