= Abbasid Civil War =

Abbasid Civil War may refer to:

- The Fourth Fitna, specifically the conflict between al-Amin and al-Ma'mun in 811–813
- The Abbasid civil war (865–866) during the Anarchy at Samarra
