= Talha ibn Tahir =

Tahirid governor of Khurasan from 822 to 828

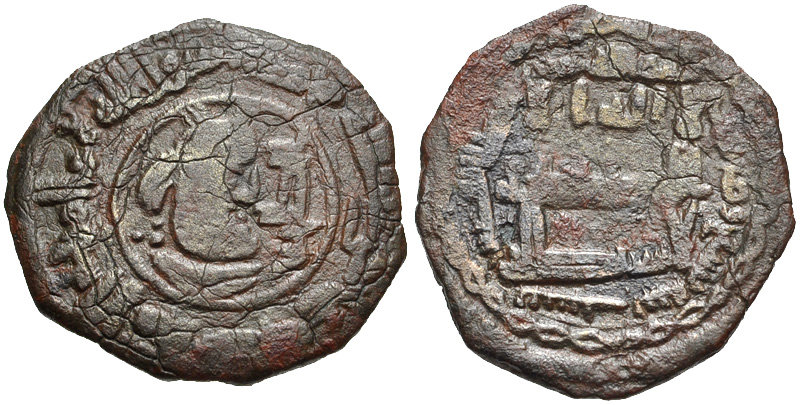
- Fals minted under Talha ibn Tahir in 824

Governor of Khurasan
- In office 822 – 828
- Monarch: Al-Ma'mun
- Preceded by: Tahir ibn Husayn
- Succeeded by: Abdallah ibn Tahir

Personal details
- Born: Unknown date
- Died: 828 Sistan, Abbasid Caliphate
- Parent: Tahir ibn Husayn

Talha ibn Tahir (Arabic: طلحة بن طاهر; died 828) was the second Tahirid governor of Khurasan from 822 until his death in 828.

In 822, Tahir ibn Husayn, who had taken control of Khurasan the previous year, died. According to some reports, the caliph al-Ma'mun at first supported replacing him with Talha's brother Abdallah ibn Tahir al-Khurasani, but the latter was occupied with rebels in the Jazira, so Talha was confirmed as governor of eastern Iran instead.

Talha's rule is mostly known for his campaigns in Sistan, another province under his rule, against the local Kharijites, who were led by a Hamza ibn Adharak. Fighting between the two continued until 828, when both Hamza and Talha died. Talha's brother Abdallah replaced him as governor of Khurasan.

Preceded by Tahir ibn Husayn	Governor of Khurasan; 822–828	Succeeded by Abdallah ibn Tahir al-Khurasani
