= Muhammad ibn Tahir =

Governor of Khorasan and Baghdad

Governor of Khurasan
- In office 862 – 873
- Monarchs: Al-Musta'in, Al-Mu'tazz, Al-Muhtadi, Al-Mu'tamid
- Preceded by: Tahir ibn Abdallah
- Succeeded by: None (Khurasan taken over by the Saffarids)

Governor of Baghdad
- In office 885 – 889
- Monarch: al-Mutamid
- Preceded by: Ubaydallah ibn Abdallah ibn Tahir
- Succeeded by: Ubaydallah ibn Abdallah ibn Tahir

Personal details
- Born: Unknown date
- Died: 910
- Parent: Tahir ibn Abdallah

Abu 'Abdallah Muhammad ibn Tahir ibn 'Abdallah (Arabic: أبو عبد الله محمد بن طاهر بن عبد الله, died c. 910) was the last Tahirid governor of Khurasan, from 862 until 873. He was the governor during the period of Extreme instability in Abbasid Caliphate and Civil war of 865–866. His career spanned under four caliphs al-Musta'in, al-Mu'tazz, al-Muhtadi and al-Mu'tamid. He was later appointed as governor of Baghdad by caliph al-Mu'tamid from 885 to 889.

== Governor of Khurasan ==
When Muhammad's father Tahir ibn Abdallah died in 862, the caliph wanted to replace him with Tahir's brother Muhammad ibn Abdallah ibn Tahir, but after the latter refused he appointed Muhammad as governor. The caliph however did not grant Muhammad other titles usually reserved for the Tahirid governor of Khurasan, such as the military governorship of Iraq and Baghdad (sahib al-shurta), but instead gave them to Muhammad ibn Abdallah.

When he became governor, Muhammad was still young and rather inexperienced. Only two years after he succeeded his father, Tabaristan was lost to a Zaydi revolt under Hasan ibn Zayd ibn Muhammad, and the Tahirids were unable to recover the province. In 867, the Saffarid amir of Sistan, Ya'qub al-Saffar, took Herat and imprisoned its Tahirid governor. An army was dispatched under the Samanid Ibrahim ibn Ilyas to stop Ya'qub, but was defeated, after which Muhammad was forced to come to terms. During this time Muhammad also tried to gain the offices in the West that had been given to his uncle Muhammad. After the latter died in 867, his brother 'Ubaydallah had taken over the offices. In opposition to Ubaydallah, Muhammad sent another uncle, Sulayman ibn 'Abdallah, as his representative in Iraq, and Sulayman was able to gain the posts at the expense of Ubaydallah, although the latter would eventually recover them.

The weakness of Muhammad's rule in Khurasan would eventually lead to the end of Tahirid rule there. In 873, the Saffarid Ya'qub marched on Muhammad's capital, Nishapur. Muhammad refused to flee and was captured by the Saffarids. For three years he remained in captivity, but was freed by caliphal forces after the Saffarids were defeated at the Battle of Dair al-'Aqul in 876. After he was freed the caliph reinvested him with the governorship of Khurasan, although Muhammad never asserted his authority there. Several anti-Saffarid partisans in Khurasan, such as Ahmad al-Khujistani and Rafi' ibn Harthama, placed Muhammad's name in the khutba in areas they managed to control, but Muhammad never exercised any actual authority over them.

== Later life ==
After being freed by the caliph, Muhammad took up residence in Baghdad and from there attempted to gain the offices held by Ubaydallah ibn Abdallah. This conflict between the two Tahirids would continue for several years. In 879, the Saffarid Ya'qub died and was succeeded by his brother Amr bin Laith. Amr reached an agreement with the caliph and was invested with Khurasan, replacing Muhammad. As the governor of Khurasan, Amr now asserted the rights formally held by the Tahirids to nominate his representative for the offices in the West; his choice fell on 'Ubadydallah. Amr also used his influence to have Muhammad arrested for allegedly supporting Khujistani, although there was little evidence to support this.

Muhammad regained caliphal favor when the peace between the caliphate and the Saffarids fell out in around 884. He was made governor of Baghdad in place of 'Ubaydallah and regained the title of governor of Khurasan, though as before he was never able to reestablish his rule in that province. He died sometime around 910.

== Sources ==
- Bosworth, Clifford Edmund (1994). The History of the Saffarids of Sistan and the Maliks of Nimruz (247/861 to 949/1542-3). Costa Mesa: Mazda Publishers. ISBN 1-56859-015-6.
- Bosworth, C.E. (1975). "The Ṭāhirids and Ṣaffārids". In Frye, Richard N. (ed.). The Cambridge History of Iran. Vol. 4. Cambridge: Cambridge University Press. pp. 90–135. ISBN 0-521-20093-8.
- Al-Mas'udi, Ali ibn al-Husain (1874). Les Prairies D'Or, Tome Huitieme (in French). Trans. C. Barbier de Meynard. Paris: Imprimerie Nationale.
- Al-Tabari, Abu Ja'far Muhammad ibn Jarir (1985–2007). Ehsan Yar-Shater (ed.). The History of Al-Ṭabarī. Vol. 40 vols. Albany, NY: State University of New York Press.
- Al-Ya'qubi, Ahmad ibn Abu Ya'qub (1883). Houtsma, M. Th. (ed.). Historiae, Vol. 2. Leiden: E. J. Brill.
- Zetterstéen, K.V. (1993). "Muhammad b. Tahir". In Bosworth, C. E.; van Donzel, E.; Heinrichs, W. P. & Pellat, Ch. (eds.). The Encyclopaedia of Islam, Second Edition. Volume VII: Mif–Naz. Leiden: E. J. Brill. p. 410. ISBN 978-90-04-09419-2.

Preceded by Tahir ibn Abdallah	Tahirid governor of Khurasan; 862–873	Khurasan taken over by the Saffarids
Preceded by 'Ubaydallah ibn 'Abdallah ibn Tahir	Tahirid governor of Baghdad; 885–889	Succeeded by 'Ubaydallah ibn 'Abdallah ibn Tahir
