= Muhammad Hisham at-Tahiri =

Afghan-Kuwaiti cleric (born 1969)

Sheikh Dr. Muhammad Hisham at-Tahiri
- Title: Sheikh, Doctor

Personal life
- Born: Muhammad Hisham bin Lal Muhammad bin Jan Muhammad bin Niaz Muhammad bin Din Muhammad al-Abdul Ghani at-Tahiri; 4 November 1969 (age 56) Baghlan, Afghanistan
- Education: Islamic University of Madinah (Bachelor of Sharia, Master's degree in Aqeedah, PhD degree in Aqeedah)
- Occupation: Cleric
- Website: drabosalahm.com

Religious life
- Religion: Islam
- Denomination: Sunni
- Jurisprudence: Ghayr Muqallid
- Creed: Athari
- Movement: Salafism

Muslim leader
- Influenced by: Ibn Taymiyya; Muhammad ibn Abd al-Wahhab; Abd al-Aziz ibn Baz; Al-Albani; Ibn Uthaymin; Saleh al-Fawzan

YouTube information
- Channel: قناة د. محمد هشام الطاهري
- Genre: Islamic
- Subscribers: 3,580
- Views: 106,445
- Last updated: 18 September 2026

YouTube information
- Channel: قناة الفوائد لفضيلة الشيخ د.محمد هشام طاهري
- Genre: Islamic
- Subscribers: 16,000
- Views: 2,762,702
- Last updated: 18 September 2026

Muhammad Hisham at-Tahiri, also known as Abu Salah is an Afghan-Kuwaiti Muslim scholar who lives and teaches in Kuwait. He was born in Afghanistan on November 4, 1969. In 1980, he and his father fled to Kuwait when he was 10. He belongs to the Banu Tahir family and teaches out of Kuwait City.

== Early life and background ==
Muhammed Hisham at-Tahiri was born on November 4, 1969 in a rural village of Afghanistan near Baghlan. His family descends from the Banu Tahir family of Khuza'a and is related to Prince Abdallah ibn Tahir al-Khurasani, a Tahirid governor who ruled as the third Tahirid ruler. His father was the scholar of his village and at-Tahiri's uncle was considered as the main Sheikh of the Abdul-Ghani tribe of Banu Tahir. His great-grandfather moved from Herat to Baghlan, where he settled down.

== Education ==
In Afghanistan, he grew up going to public school while studying Islam from his father and uncle. He studied and memorized the Quran, Fiqh, and Aqeedah with them in Arabic and his native language, Pashto.

Soon after the outbreak of the Soviet-Afghan War, at-Tahiri's father joined the resistance against the Soviet Union along with the other scholars of his village and city. At-Tahiri's village was attacked in an early battle of the war. After this, at-Tahiri, his father, and other survivors escaped their village in order to flee the Russian troops. Soon after, him and his father made it to Kuwait in early 1980 where he continued to study with his father and at school.

Later on, Muhammed Hisham was admitted to the Islamic University of Madinah, where he completed his bachelor's degree in Sharia in 2000, his master's degree in Aqeedah in 2004, and a PhD in Aqeedah in 2008 at the age of 39. He has served as a muezzin in the Kuwaiti Ministry of Defense, Imam and teacher at Aisha Al-Mahri Mosque, lecturer at the University of Kuwait, and assistant dean at Jumeira University.

== Works ==
He has taught over 200+ courses and classes in Kuwait, Qatar, the United Arab Emirates, Sudan, and Turkey. He has reviewed and authored 130+ books, scientific essays, and video classes including, but not limited to:

- This is Islam
- Summary of the Reports of the Imams of the call in violation of the doctrine of the Kharijites and its invalidation
- Memorizing the Qur'an is a dream that has Steps
- The "Calls of the Merciful for Human Sons"
- The series "Wahhab Calls to the People of the Book"
- The Reading Schedule of the Salaf In Ramadan
