= Muhammad ibn Ishaq ibn Ibrahim =

Chief of security in Baghdad

Chief of security (Shurtah) in Baghdad
- In office 850–851
- Monarch: Al-Mutawakkil
- Preceded by: Ishaq ibn Ibrahim
- Succeeded by: Abdallah ibn Ishaq

Personal details
- Born: unknown date
- Died: 851
- Parent: Ishaq ibn Ibrahim al-Mus'abi

Muhammad ibn Ishaq ibn Ibrahim (Arabic: محمد بن إسحاق بن إبراهيم, died June 851) was a Mus'abid chief of security of Baghdad for the Abbasid Caliphate, from 850 until his death.

== Career ==
Muhammad was the son of Ishaq ibn Ibrahim al-Mus'abi, a member of a collateral branch of the Tahirid family and the head of security (shurtah) in Baghdad from 822 to 850. During his father's lifetime Muhammad had been sent to attend the court of the caliph in Samarra, where he entered into the service of the central government and acted as Ishaq's representative.

Upon the death of Ishaq in July 850, Muhammad succeeded him as chief of security of Baghdad; at the same time, by delivering the valuables in Ishaq's storehouses to the caliph al-Mutawakkil and his heirs al-Muntasir and al-Mu'tazz, he secured their favor and was given control over al-Yamamah, al-Bahrayn, Egypt and the Mecca Road as a reward. He also received Fars, but this appointment forced to deal with that province's governor, his uncle Muhammad ibn Ibrahim al-Mus'abi, who adopted a hostile attitude toward him. In response, Muhammad deposed his uncle from his governorship and procured his murder, and appointed his cousin al-Husayn ibn Isma'il al-Mus'abi to govern Fars instead.

Muhammad died in June 851, after which his positions in Baghdad and the Sawad were assigned to 'Abdallah ibn Ishaq ibn Ibrahim.

== Notes ==
Preceded by Ishaq ibn Ibrahim al-Mus'abi	Mus'abid governor of Baghdad; 850–851	Succeeded by 'Abdallah ibn Ishaq ibn Ibrahim
