= Sulayman ibn Abdallah ibn Tahir =

Governor of Tabaristan (died 879)

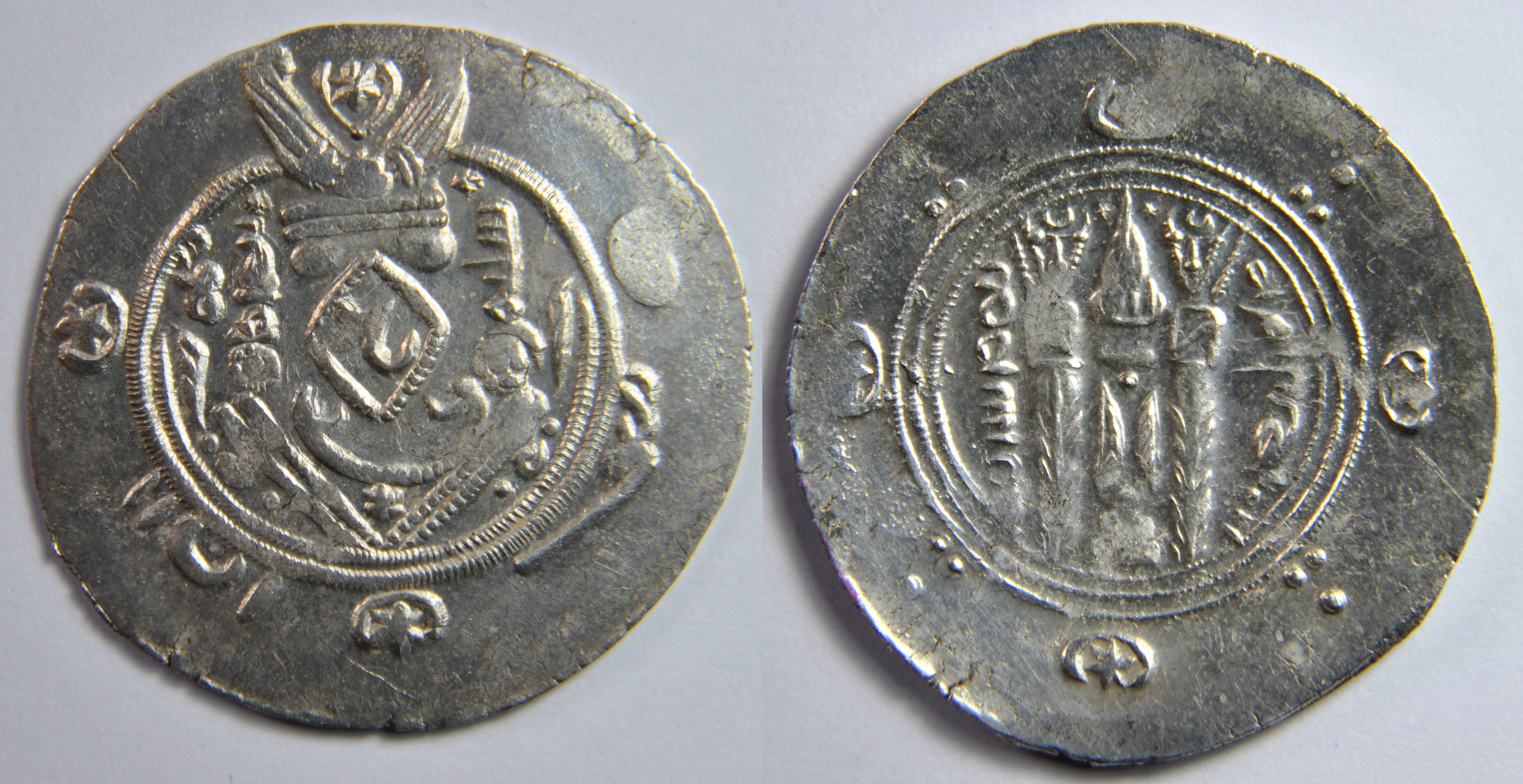
- Drachm minted during his reign

Governor of Tabaristan
- In office 851/4 - 864

Chief of security (shurtah) in Baghdad
- In office 869 - 879
- Preceded by: Ubaydallah ibn Abdallah ibn Tahir
- Succeeded by: Ubaydallah ibn Abdallah

Personal details
- Born: unknown date
- Died: 879 Abbasid Caliphate
- Parent: Abdallah ibn Tahir

Sulayman ibn Abdallah ibn Tahir (Arabic: سليمان بن عبد الله بن طاهر) was a ninth century Tahirid official in the service of the Abbasid Caliphate. He was the last governor of Tabaristan, ruling there until he was expelled by the rebellion of al-Hasan ibn Zayd in 864, and was afterwards appointed governor of Baghdad and the Sawad in 869, a position which he held until his death in 879.

== Governorship of Tabaristan ==
Sulayman was the son of Abdallah ibn Tahir, the governor of Khurasan from 828 until 845. According to Ibn Isfandiyar, he was appointed as governor of Tabaristan in either 851 or 854, and served there on behalf of the Tahirids of Khursasan, under whose jurisdiction the province fell. During his time in Tabaristan, Sulayman came under the influence of his deputy Muhammad ibn Aws al-Balkhi, who was able to appoint members of his family as governors of the cities and districts of the province. These last dealt with the local inhabitants in an extremely harsh manner, and Sulayman's administration soon became accused of excessive taxation and tyranny.

By 864, Tahirid misrule in Tabaristan caused the residents of the western districts of the province to rise up in revolt. The rebels, who proclaimed the 'Alid al-Hasan ibn Zayd as their leader, quickly gained strength, drawing support from the people of Tabaristan as well as the Daylamites of neighboring Daylam. After defeating Ibn Aws in a battle they were able to enter Amul in November 864 and then marched on Sariyah, where Sulayman was stationed. Sulayman's troops set out to defend the city, but al-Hasan was able to send a second force to sneak past them and enter Sariyah unopposed. Sulayman then abandoned Tabaristan for Jurjan, leaving al-Hasan in control of the province.

Following his flight to Jurjan, Sulayman reassembled his troops and requested reinforcements from his nephew Muhammad ibn Tahir, the governor of Khurasan. He then marched back toward Tabaristan and won a victory over the rebels in early 865, forcing al-Hasan to retreat and allowing him to reoccupy much of the province. His fortunes soon reversed again, however, and after a fresh defeat he again fled to Jurjan. Another expedition was soon after undertaken against the rebels, but this also ended in failure, and Sulayman thereafter gave up his attempts to reclaim the province for good.

== Governorship of Baghdad ==
In 869 Sulayman made his way to Iraq, and presented himself before the caliph al-Mu'tazz in Samarra. On March 24, he was appointed as chief of security (shurtah) in Baghdad and the Sawad, replacing his brother Ubaydallah ibn Abdallah ibn Tahir in that position.

Upon receiving his appointment, Sulayman was forced to deal with the extremely tumultuous state of affairs in Baghdad. News of the forced abdication of al-Mu'tazz and the accession of al-Muhtadi in July 869 was met with hostility by the city's residents, who demanded that the oath of allegiance be given to Abu Ahmad ibn al-Mutawakkil instead, and it was only after a spell of violence that the prayers were made in al-Muhtadi's name. Sulayman also suffered from a shortage of available funds, and found it difficult to meet the demands of the soldiers for the pay of their salaries. Before long, a rivalry broke out between the Baghdadi commanders and Muhammad ibn Aws, who was in charge of the troops that had come with Sulayman from Khurasan and al-Ray, further complicating matters in the city.

After several incidents, the Baghdadi troops grew fed up with the depredations and payment demands of Muhammad's soldiers and rioted. A fierce battle broke out between the two factions, ending with Muhammad being defeated and forced to flee the city. Sulayman then stepped in and mollified the Baghdadi commanders, while sending a message to Muhammad instructing him to return to Khurasan. The latter, however, rejected this command and set about plundering the neighborhoods of Baradan and al-Nahrawan to the north of Baghdad, which continued until the central government appeased him by appointing him over the Khurasan Road two and a half months later.

Sulayman died in August or September 879, and his positions were assigned to 'Ubaydallah ibn Abdallah in his place.

== Notes ==
Preceded by Ubaydallah ibn Abdallah ibn Tahir	Security chief of Baghdad; 869–879	Succeeded by Ubaydallah ibn Abdallah ibn Tahir
