= Tahir ibn Abdallah =

Tahirid governor of Khurasan from 845 to 862

Governor of Khurasan
- In office 845 – 862
- Monarchs: Al-Wathiq, Al-Mutawakkil, and Al-Muntasir
- Preceded by: Abdallah ibn Tahir
- Succeeded by: Muhammad ibn Tahir

Personal details
- Born: Unknown date
- Died: 862 Khurasan, Abbasid Caliphate
- Children: Muhammad ibn Tahir
- Parent: Abdallah ibn Tahir

Tahir ibn 'Abdallah (died 862) was the Tahirid governor of Khurasan from 845 until 862. He was the governor for seventeen years under Abbasid caliph al-Wathiq, al-Mutawakkil and al-Muntasir.

During his father 'Abdallah's lifetime, Tahir was sent into the steppes to the north in order to keep the Oghuz Turks in line; he probably received Samanid assistance in this venture. When 'Abdallah died in 844, the Caliph al-Wathiq originally appointed another Tahirid, Ishaq ibn Ibrahim al-Mus'abi, as his successor in Khurasan, but then reversed this decision and confirmed Tahir as governor.

Little is known about Tahir's rule, although there was unrest in some of the outlying provinces. Sistan, for example, was lost to the Tahirids when the 'ayyar leader Salih ibn al-Nadr drove out Tahir's governor and took power there himself. Tahir died in 862; his will stated that his young son Muhammad should succeed him as governor, and this was honored by the caliph.

== Sources ==
- Bosworth, C. E. (1975). "The Ṭāhirids and Ṣaffārids". In Frye, Richard N. (ed.). The Cambridge History of Iran. Vol. 4. Cambridge: Cambridge University Press. pp. 90–135. ISBN 0-521-20093-8.
- Gordon, Matthew S. (2001). The Breaking of a Thousand Swords: A History of the Turkish Military of Samarra (A.H. 200–275/815–889 C.E.). Albany, New York: State University of New York Press. ISBN 0-7914-4795-2.

Preceded by Abdallah ibn Tahir al-Khurasani	Governor of Khurasan; 845–862	Succeeded by Muhammad ibn Tahir
