= Abdallah ibn Tahir al-Khurasani =

Tahirid governor of Khorasan from 828 to 845

Abdallah ibn Tahir

Governor of Khurasan
- In office 828–845
- Monarchs: Al-Ma'mun; Al-Mu'tasim; Al-Wathiq
- Preceded by: Talha ibn Tahir
- Succeeded by: Tahir ibn Abdallah

Governor of Egypt
- In office 826–827
- Monarch: Al-Ma'mun
- Preceded by: Ubaydallah ibn al-Sari
- Succeeded by: Isa ibn Yazid al-Juludi

Governor of Syria
- In office 820–822
- Monarch: Al-Mamun
- Preceded by: Muhammad ibn Salih ibn Bayhas (810–820)
- Succeeded by: Abu Ishaq Muhammad ibn Harun al-Rashid

Personal details
- Born: 798 Iran
- Died: 845 (aged 46–47) Nishapur
- Children: Tahir ibn Abdallah; Muhammad ibn Abdallah; Ubaydallah ibn Abdallah; Sulayman ibn Abdallah
- Parent: Tahir ibn Husayn

Abdallah ibn Tahir (Persian: عبدالله طاهر, Arabic: عبد الله بن طاهر الخراساني) (ca. 798–844/5) was a military leader and the Tahirid governor of Khurasan from 828 until his death. He is perhaps the most famous of the Tahirids. His career spanned twenty-five years under three caliphs, al-Ma'mun, al-Mu'tasim, and al-Wathiq. Militarily, he is known for defeating the powerful rebels Nasr ibn Shabath in the Jazira (Upper Mesopotamia) and Ubaydallah ibn al-Sari in Egypt.

Map of the Tahirid Khurasan

== Early life ==
Abdallah's early career consisted of serving with his father Tahir ibn Husayn in pacifying the lands of the Abbasid Caliphate following the civil war between al-Amin and al-Ma'mun. He later succeeded his father as governor of al-Jazira, with the task of defeating the rebel Nasr ibn Shabath, and between 824 and 826 convinced Nasr to surrender. He was then sent to Egypt, where he successfully ended an uprising led by 'Abd-Allah ibn al-Sari. He also recovered Alexandria, which had been seized by Andalusian Muslim corsairs twelve years before; following their expulsion, the corsairs headed to Byzantine Crete, establishing Muslim rule there for the first time.

== Governorship ==
Although Abdallah had been made the governor of Khurasan following his brother's death in 828, he only arrived in Nishapur in 830; in the meantime he had been busy fighting more revolts. He was assigned for a brief time in 829 to stop the Khurramite Babak, but then was given new orders by the caliph to move to Khurasan and stop the Kharijites. Abdallah's brother 'Ali acted as deputy governor of Khurasan until he was ready to take up residence in Nishapur.

Due to the Turkic tribes' pursuit of the lands of Transoxiana, Governor Abdullah ibn Tahir launched regular campaigns against the Oghuz Turks.

During his reign as governor, Abdallah was occupied with affairs in both the eastern and western parts of his territories. In the east, he took steps to improve the strength of the Samanids, his vassals in Transoxiana. The Samanids were important, as they controlled the trade between Central Asia and the central Caliphate, including the trade in Turkic slaves. Also in the east, in 834, an Alid, Muhammad ibn al-Qasim, revolted in Juzjan, but Abdallah's forces eventually managed to capture him.

In the west, meanwhile, Abdallah came into conflict with the local ruler of Tabaristan, the Ispahbadh Mazyar. As the ruler of the east, Abdallah claimed Tabaristan as a dependency and insisted that the tribute owed by Mazyar to the caliph should pass through him. Mazyar, however, was looking to expand his dominion and wanted to be free of Tahirid influence, so he refused to accept this and demanded that he be able to pay his tribute directly to the caliph. In this struggle Mazyar had the support of the Afshin, who allegedly wanted to control the Tahirid lands himself. Abdallah was able to turn the caliph against Mazyar, and in 839 was ordered to stop the Ispahbad. Mazyar, a recent convert to Islam, heavily relied on the Zoroastrians of the province but in the end was captured, sent to Iraq and executed. Tahirid control over Tabaristan was therefore secured until the Zaydid revolt of 864. During the same year, in 839, an earthquake occurred in Farghana, destroying much of the city.

== Death and Descendants ==
Abdallah died in Nishapur, either at the end of 844 or in 845. He was succeeded by his son Tahir. According to the famous Seljuq vizier Nizam al-Mulk, Abdallah was buried in Nishapur, where his tomb became a pilgrimage site.

In the modern day, the Afghan cleric living in Kuwait, Muhammad Hisham at-Tahiri, is a descendant of Abdullah ibn Tahir al-Khuza'i. He is of the Abdul-Ghani branch of the Banu Tahir (descendants of the Tahirids). The family originally was based in Herat, until his great-grandfather moved northeast to Baghlan (not far from Balkh), where he was born in 1969.

== Sources ==
- Bosworth, C. E. (1969). "The Ṭāhirids and Persian Literature". Iran. 7. Taylor & Francis Ltd.: 103–106. doi:10.2307/4299615. JSTOR 4299615.
- Bosworth, C.E. (1975). "The Ṭāhirids and Ṣaffārids". In Frye, Richard N. (ed.). The Cambridge History of Iran: From the Arab Invasion to the Saljuqs. Vol. 4. Cambridge: Cambridge University Press. pp. 90–135. ISBN 0-521-20093-8.
- Bosworth, C. E. (2011). "ʿAbdallāh b. Ṭāher". Encyclopædia Iranica. Archived from the original on 5 February 2019.
- Kennedy, Hugh (2004) [1986]. The Prophet and the Age of the Caliphates: The Islamic Near East from the 6th to the 11th Century (Second ed.). Harlow: Longman. ISBN 978-0-582-40525-7.

Preceded by Talha ibn Tahir	Governor of Khurasan; 828–845	Succeeded by Tahir ibn Abdallah
Preceded by Ubaydallah ibn al-Sari	Governor of Egypt; 826–827	Succeeded by Isa ibn Yazid al-Juludi
