= Tahirid dynasty =

821–873 Sunni Persian dynasty of Khorasan; Abbasid vassals

Tahirid Dynasty طاهریان Tâheriyân
- 821–873
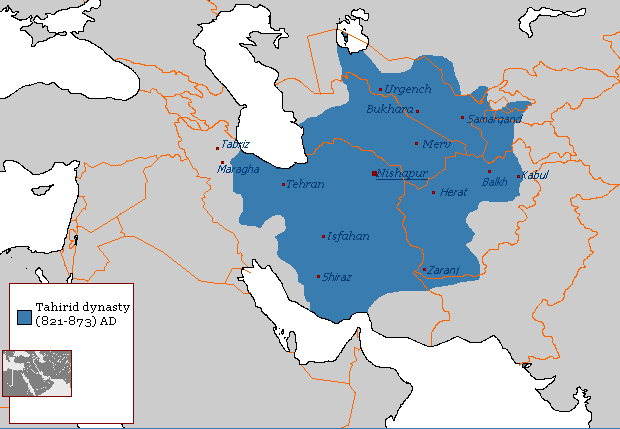
- Provinces governed by the Tahirids
- Status: De jure governorate of the Abbasid Caliphate
- Capital: Merv, later Nishapur
- Common languages: Early New Persian (court, informal); Arabic (literature/poetry/science)
- Religion: Sunni Islam
- Government: Caliphal governoral emirate
- Emir
  - 821–822: Tahir ibn Husayn
  - 822–828: Talha ibn Tahir
  - 828–845: Abdallah ibn Tahir
  - 845–862: Tahir ibn Abdallah
  - 862–872: Muhammad ibn Tahir
- Historical era: Medieval
  - Established: 821
  - Disestablished: 873

Area
- 800 est.: 1,000,000 km^{2} (390,000 sq mi)
Preceded by	Succeeded by
Abbasid Caliphate	Saffarid Empire; Alid dynasties of northern Iran

The Tahirid dynasty (Persian: طاهریان, romanized: Tâheriyân, pronounced [t̪ɒːheɾiˈjɒːn]) was a culturally Arabized, Sunni Muslim dynasty of Persian dehqan origin. They ruled as governors of Khorasan from 821 to 873 as well as serving as military and security commanders in Abbasid Baghdad until 891. The dynasty was founded by Tahir ibn Husayn, a leading general in the service of the Abbasid caliph al-Ma'mun. For his support of al-Ma'mun in the Fourth Fitna, he was granted the governance of Khorasan.

The Tahirids, however, were not an independent dynasty — according to Hugh Kennedy: "The Tahirids are sometimes considered as the first independent Iranian dynasty, but such a view is misleading. The arrangement was effectively a partnership between the Abbasids and the Tahirids." Indeed, the Tahirids were loyal to the Abbasid caliphs and in return enjoyed considerable autonomy; they were in effect viceroys representing Abbasid rule in Persia. The tax revenue from Khorasan sent to the caliphal treasury in Baghdad was perhaps larger than those collected previously.

== Rulers of Khurasan ==
=== Rise ===
The founder of the Tahirid dynasty was Tahir ibn Husayn, a Sunni Persian of dehqan origin, who had played a major military role in the civil war between the rival caliphs al-Amin and al-Ma'mun. He and his ancestors had previously been awarded minor governorships in eastern Khorasan for their service to the Abbasids. In 821, Tahir was made governor of Khorasan, but he died soon afterwards. (Note: "The Taherids of Iraq. As the events of the late Taherid period demonstrate, the Taherids in Iraq were just about as powerful and important, even if less well known, than their Khorasani relatives. They regularly held positions as military commanders, heads of the security forces (ṣāheb al-šorṭa) for eastern and western Baghdad, and chief tax collectors or administrators (e.g., ʿāmel and moʿāwen) for the Sawād of Kufa.") The caliph then appointed Tahir's son, Talha, governor of Khorasan. Talha was unsuccessful in removing the Kharijites from Sistan, and following the death of the Kharijite leader, Hamza b. Adarak (d.828), the Tahirids occupied Zarang but never succeeded in collecting taxes in the surrounding countryside.

Tahir's other son, Abdallah, was sent to Egypt to retake the province from rebellious Ubaydallah, and after the successful conquest was instated as the wāli of Egypt and the Arabian Peninsula. He was given the governorship of Khorasan when Talha died in 828. Abdallah is considered one of the greatest of the Tahirid rulers, as his reign witnessed a flourishing of agriculture in his native land of Khorasan, popularity in the eastern lands of the Abbasid caliphate and expanding influence due to his experience with the western parts of the caliphate. A noted poet, he sympathized with all things Arabic.

The replacement of the Pahlavi script with the Arabic script in order to write the Persian language was done by the Tahirids in 9th century Khurasan.

=== Fall ===
Map of Tahirid Khurasan

Abdullah died in 844 and was succeeded by his son Tahir II. Not much is known of Tahir's rule, but the administrative dependency of Sistan was lost to rebels during his governorship. Tahirid rule began to seriously deteriorate after Tahir's son Muhammad ibn Tahir became governor, due to his carelessness with the affairs of the state and lack of experience with politics. Oppressive policies in Tabaristan, another dependency of Khorasan, resulted in the people of that province revolting and declaring their allegiance to the independent Zaydi ruler Hasan ibn Zayd in 864. In Khorasan itself, Muhammad's rule continued to grow increasingly weak, and in 873 he was finally overthrown by the Saffarid dynasty, who annexed Khorasan to their own empire in eastern Persia.

== Governors of Baghdad ==
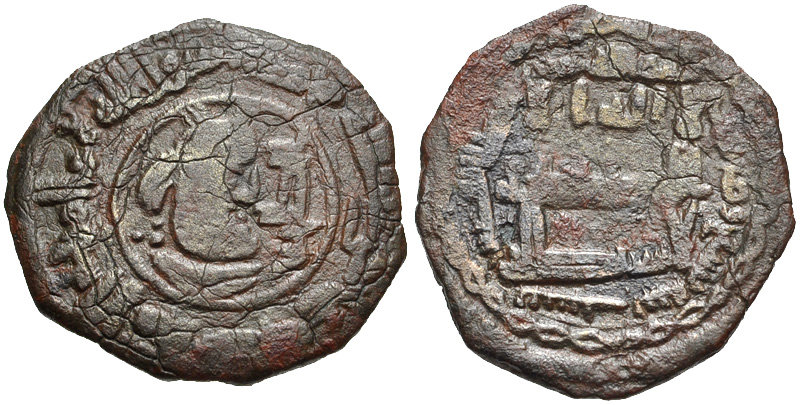
Coinage of Talha ibn Tahir, with Sasanian-type bust. Dated AH 209 (AD 824).

Besides their hold over Khorasan, the Tahirids also served as the military governors (ashab al-shurta) of Baghdad, beginning with Tahir's appointment to that position in 820. After he left for Khorasan, the governorship of Baghdad was given to a member of a collateral branch of the family, Ishaq ibn Ibrahim, who controlled the city for over twenty-five years. During Ishaq's term as governor, he was responsible for implementing the Mihna (inquisition) in Baghdad. His administration also witnessed the departure of the caliphs from Baghdad, as they made the recently constructed city of Samarra their new capital. When Ishaq died in 849 he was succeeded first by two of his sons, and then in 851 by Tahir's grandson Muhammad ibn Abdallah.

Abdallah played a major role in the events of the "Anarchy at Samarra" in the 860s, giving refuge to the caliph al-Musta'in and commanding the defense of Baghdad when it was besieged by the forces of the rival caliph al-Mu'tazz in 865. The following year, he forced al-Musta'in to abdicate and recognized al-Mu'tazz as caliph, and in exchange was allowed to retain his control over Baghdad. Violent riots plagued Baghdad during the last years of Abdallah's life, and conditions in the city remained tumultuous after he died and was succeeded by his brothers, first Ubaydallah and then Sulayman. Eventually order was restored in Baghdad, and the Tahirids continued to serve as governors of the city for another two decades. In 891, however, Badr al-Mu'tadidi was put in charge of the security of Baghdad in place of the Tahirids, and the family soon lost their prominence within the caliphate after that.

== Language and culture ==
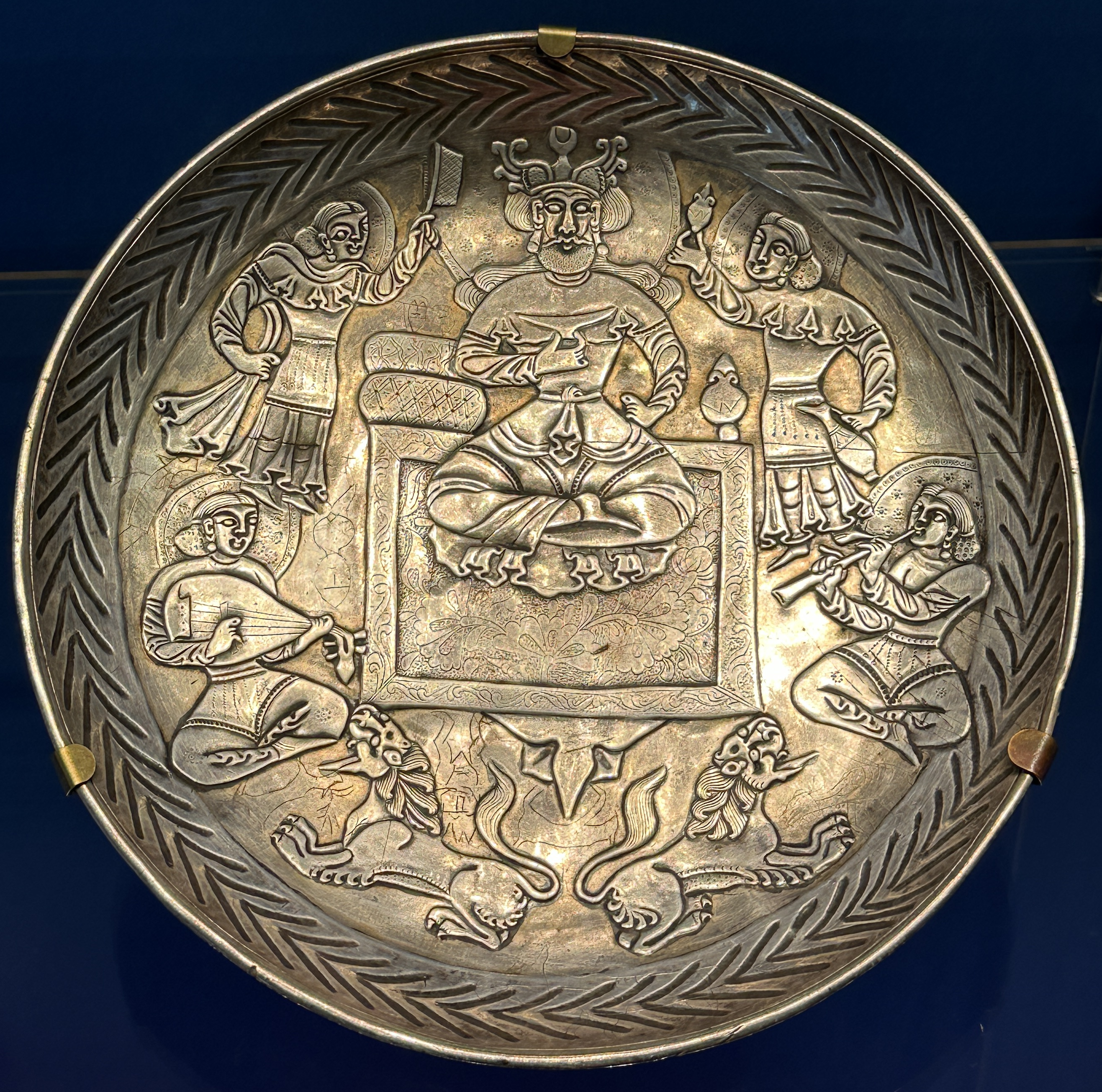
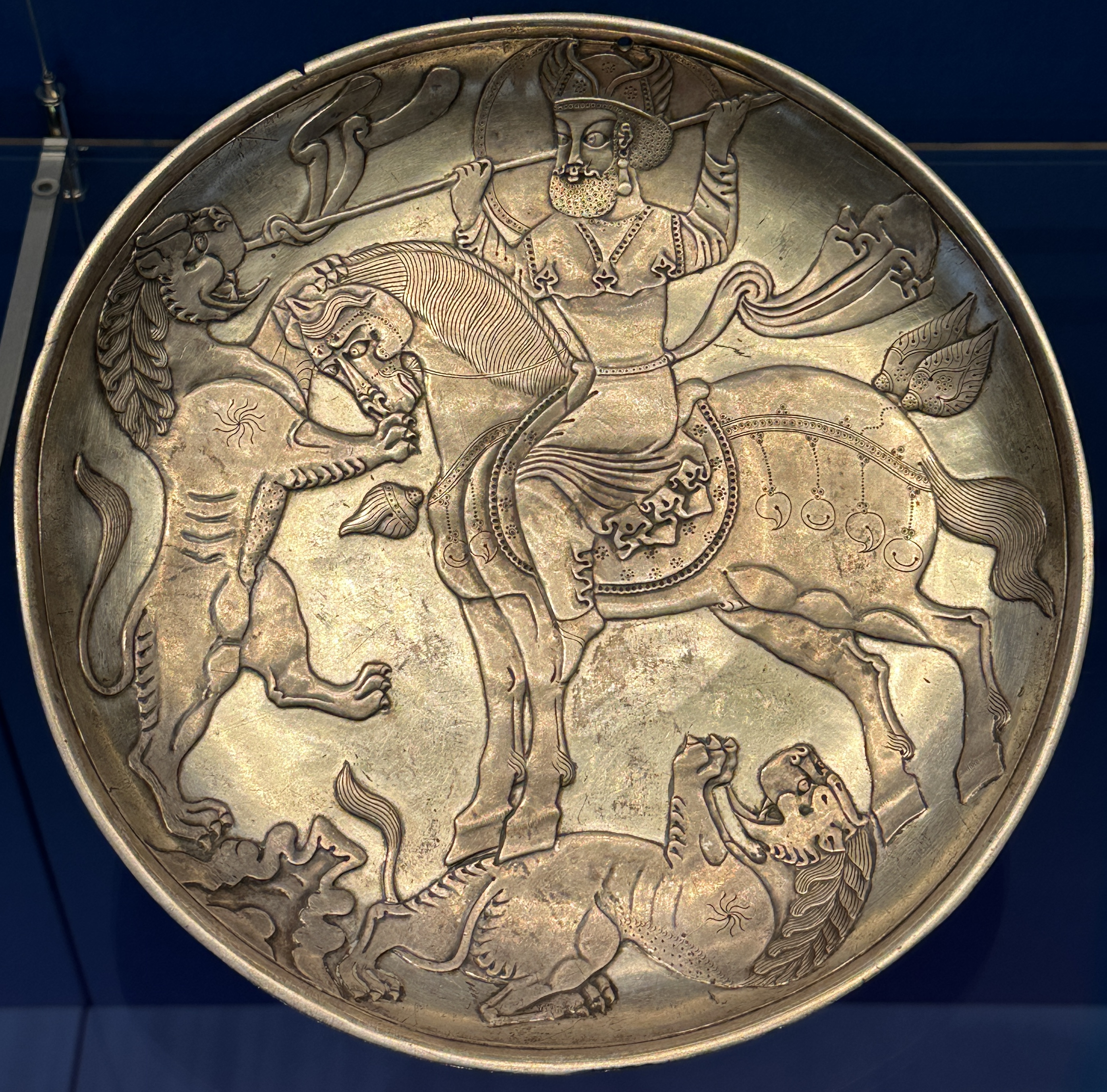
Early 9th century Sasanian-style silver plates from Merv.

The historian Clifford Edmund Bosworth explains that while the Tahirids were Persians, they were highly Arabized in culture, and eager to be accepted in the caliphal world, where cultivation of things Arabic gave social and cultural prestige. Due to this the Tahirids were not part of the renaissance of Early New Persian language and culture. He adds that the Persian language was at least tolerated in the entourage of the Tahirids, whereas the Saffarids played a leading part in the renaissance of Persian literature. Tahirids were passionate about Arabic poetry, and were extremely generous to poets writing in Arabic. Tahir ibn Husayn was highly adept at writing Arabic prose. The Tahirid governor of Khurasan, Isḥāq ibn Ibrāhīm ibn Ḥusayn al-Muṣʿabī, employed Abu Tammum who wrote Arabic poetry.

Centuries later, both 'Aufi and Daulatshah wrote that the Tahirids were hostile to Persian literature. 'Abd-Allah ibn Tahir ordered that the Persian novel Vamiq-u Adhra "The Ardent Lover and the Virgin" and other Persian and Zoroastrian works be destroyed, according to Daulatshah. The perceived hostility of the Tahirids toward Persian culture may have stemmed from the efforts of the early Tahirids, particularly Tahir and ʿAbdallāh, to emphasize their family’s connections to the ancient Arab nobility through their association as clients of the Khuza'a tribe.

However, according to the historian Shivan Mahendrarajah, in reference to the dynasties of the Iranian Intermezzo of which the Tahirids are considered part:

Persian (the language) and Iranian (the identity) were reasserting themselves. Iranians were adapting Arab-Islamic cultural tenets through a process of 'take the best, leave the rest'.

Within this context, Mahendrarajah adds that the Tahirids were specifically responsible for initiating the process by which Persian became written in the Perso-Arabic script, referring to this as "an ingenious Iranian adaption that allowed them to retain the heritage and charm of the Persian language".

According to al-Masudi, the Tahirids claimed descent from Rustam, the mythological Iranian hero as well as attempts to connect themselves with Banu Khuza'ah of the Quraysh.

The art historian Sheila Blair explains that the Tahirids may well have added Persian inscriptions to their (now non-extant) buildings.

=== Religion ===
The Tahirids supported Sunni orthodoxy and suppressed heterodox and sectarian movements and religio-social protests throughout Khorasan and Transoxiana. While serving as governors for the Abbasids they fought against Kharijites and Zaydi Shi'ite Hasanids, and their coins and sermons acknowledged the suzerainty of the Abbasid caliphs.

The religious scholar Abu Ubayd dedicated his work, Garîbü’l-Hadîs, to Abdallah ibn Tahir. Abdallah endowed Abu Ubayd with a monthly patronage of 10,000 dirhams, but had to travel to Abu Ubayd's home to hear the work read to him. Through works such as the Garîbü’l-Hadîs and the Kitab al-quni, the Tahirids sought to ground aspects of administrative practice in Islamic law.

In architectural projects, Mansur ibn Talha built a new minaret, after demolishing the two old minarets, for the congregational mosque in Nishapur.

Later Tahirids may have faced criticism from Sunni orthodox circles for failing to cope with Kharijite and ʿAlid challenges in the Caspian provinces. Such dissatisfaction may have contributed to the overthrow of the Tahirids in Khurasan by the Saffarid Yaʿqub ibn Layth, who captured Nishapur from Muhammad ibn Tahir II in 259/873.

== Descendants ==
The Tahirid house continued to survive through the ages in Khurasan and down till today, such as the contemporary Afghan cleric living in Kuwait, Muhammad Hisham at-Tahiri, a descendant of Abdullah ibn Tahir. His family is of the Abdul-Ghani branch of the Banu Tahir (descendants of the Tahirids). The family was originally based in Herat, until his great-grandfather moved northeast to Baghlan (not far from Balkh), where he was born in 1969.

== List of rulers ==
Following is a list of Tahirids who ruled as Abbasid governors.

=== Governors of Khurasan ===
1. Tahir I ibn Husayn, 821–822
2. Talha ibn Tahir, 822–828
3. Abdallah ibn Tahir, 828–845
4. Tahir II ibn Abdallah, 845–862
5. Muhammad ibn Tahir, 862–873

=== Governors of Baghdad ===
1. Tahir I ibn Husayn, 821–822
2. Ishaq ibn Ibrahim ibn Huasyn, 822–850
3. Muhammad ibn Ishaq, 850–851
4. Abdallah ibn Ishaq, 851
5. Muhammad ibn Abdallah, 851–867
6. Ubaydallah ibn Abdallah, 867–869, 879–885, 890–891
7. Sulayman ibn Abdallah, 869–879
8. Muhammad ibn Tahir, 885–890

== Family tree ==
Family tree of the Tahirid dynasty
Governors of Khurasan
Governors of Baghdad
Governors of Khurasan & Baghdad

Mos'eb
Husayn
Tahir I r. 821–822	Ibrahim
Talha r. 822–828	Abdullah r. 828–845	Ishaq r. 822–850
Tahir II r. 845–862	Muhammad r. 851–867	Ubayd Allah r. 867–869, 79–85, 89–91	Sulayman r. 869–879	Muhammad r. 850–851	Abd Allah r. 851–851
Muhammad r. 862–873 r. 885–890

== See also ==
- Iranian Intermezzo
- List of Muslims
- List of Sunni Muslim dynasties

== Sources ==
- Blair, Sheila S. (1998). Islamic Inscriptions. Edinburgh University Press. ISBN 9781474464482.
- Blair, S. (2003). "Language situation and scripts: Arabic". In Bosworth, C.E.; Asimov, M.S. (eds.). History of Civilizations of Central Asia. Vol. IV. Motilal Banarsidass.
- Bosworth, C. E. (1969). "The Ṭāhirids and Persian Literature". Iran. 7: 103–106. doi:10.2307/4299615. JSTOR 4299615.
- Bosworth, C.E. (1975). "The Ṭāhirids and Ṣaffārids". In Frye, Richard N. (ed.). The Cambridge History of Iran: From the Arab Invasion to the Saljuqs. Vol. 4. Cambridge: Cambridge University Press. pp. 90–135. ISBN 0-521-20093-8.
- Bosworth, C.E. (1995). "Saffarids". The Encyclopaedia of Islam. Vol. VIII:NED-SAM. Brill. pp. 795–798.
- Bosworth, C. E. (1996). The New Islamic Dynasties. Columbia University Press.
- Bosworth, C.E. (2000). "Tahirids". In Bearman, P. J.; Bianquis, Th.; Bosworth, C. E.; van Donzel, E. & Heinrichs, W. P. (eds.). The Encyclopaedia of Islam, Second Edition. Volume X: T–U. Leiden: E. J. Brill. ISBN 978-90-04-11211-7.
- Bosworth, C.E. (2012). "Ḥamza b. Ādarak". Encyclopaedia Iranica.
- Canfield, Robert L. (1991). "Introduction: the Turko-Persian tradition". In Canfield, Robert L. (ed.). Turko-Persia in Historical Perspective. Cambridge University Press.
- Daftary, F. (2003). "Sectarian and national movements in Iran, Khurasan and Transoxanial during Umayyad in early Abbasid times". In Asimov, M.S.; Bosworth, C.E. (eds.). History of Civilizations of Central Asia. Vol. IV: Part I. Motilal Banarsidass. pp. 41–60. ISBN 92-3-103467-7.
- Daniel, Elton L. (2000). "Taherids". In Yarshater, Ehsan (ed.). Encyclopædia Iranica (Online ed.). Encyclopædia Iranica Foundation.
- Daniel, Elton L. (2000a). "KHORASAN vi. History in the Taherid and Samanid Periods". Encyclopaedia Iranica.
- Esposito, John L. (2000). The Oxford History of Islam. Oxford University Press. ISBN 9780199880416.
- Gordon, Matthew S. (2001). The Breaking of a Thousand Swords: A History of the Turkish Military of Samarra (A.H. 200–275/815–889 C.E.). Albany, New York: State University of New York Press. ISBN 0-7914-4795-2.
- Hovannisian, Richard G.; Sabagh, Georges, eds. (1998). The Persian Presence in the Islamic World. Cambridge University Press.
- Kandemir, M. Yaşar (1996). "Garîbü'l-Hadîs". Türkiye Diyanet Vakfı İslâm Ansiklopedisi (in Turkish). TDV Yayınları.
- Kennedy, Hugh (2001). The Armies of the Caliphs: Military and Society in the Early Islamic State. London and New York: Routledge. ISBN 0-415-25093-5.
- Kennedy, Hugh (2016) [1986]. The Prophet and the Age of the Caliphates: The Islamic Near East from the 6th to the 11th Century (Third ed.). Abingdon, Oxon and New York: Routledge. ISBN 978-1-138-78761-2.
- Kraemer, Joel L., ed. (1989). The History of al-Ṭabarī, Volume XXXIV: Incipient Decline: The Caliphates of al-Wāthiq, al-Mutawakkil and al-Muntaṣir, A.D. 841–863/A.H. 227–248. SUNY Series in Near Eastern Studies. Albany, New York: State University of New York Press. ISBN 978-0-88706-874-4.
- Lapidus, Ira M. (2012). Islamic Societies to the Nineteenth Century: A Global History. Cambridge University Press. ISBN 9780521514415.
- Mahendrarajah, Shivan (2019). "The Iranian interlude: From Mongol decline to Timur's invasion". In Babaie, Sussan (ed.). Iran After the Mongols. I.B. Tauris. ISBN 978-1788315289.
- Marin, E. (1986). "Abd Allāh b. Țāhir". In Gibb, H. A. R.; Kramers, J. H.; Lévi-Provençal, E.; Schacht, J. (eds.). Encyclopaedia of Islam. Vol. I. E.J. Brill. ISBN 9004081143.
- Nouri, Moufid Muhammad (1967). The Scholars of Nishapur, 700–1225 (Thesis). University of Edinburgh.
- Peacock, A. C. S. (2007). Mediaeval Islamic Historiography and Political Legitimacy: Balʿamī's Tārīkhnāma. London and New York: Routledge. ISBN 978-0-415-40025-1.
- Spuler, Bertold (2015). Hoyland, Robert G.; Goldbloom, Gwendolin; Walburg, Berenike (eds.). Iran in the Early Islamic Period: Politics, Culture, Administration and Public Life between the Arab and the Seljuk Conquests, 633-1055. Brill. ISBN 978-90-04-27751-9.
- Starr, S. Frederick (2015). Lost Enlightenment: Central Asia's Golden Age from the Arab Conquest to Tamerlane. Princeton University Press. ISBN 9781400848805.
- al-Ṣūlī, Abū Bakr (2015). The Life and Times of Abū Tammām. Translated by Gruendler, Beatrice. New York University Press. ISBN 9780814770832.
- Taagepera, Rein (1997). "Expansion and Contraction Patterns of Large Polities: Context for Russia". International Studies Quarterly. 41 (3): 475–504. doi:10.1111/0020-8833.00053. JSTOR 2600793.
- Turner, John P. (2006). "Ishaq ibn Ibrahim". In Meri, Josef W. (ed.). Medieval Islamic Civilization. Vol. 1. Routledge.
- Yar-Shater, Ehsan, ed. (2007). The History of al-Tabari. State University of New York Press.
- Baumer, Christoph (2018). "Iranian-Muslim dynasties in Southwest Central Asia". The History of Central Asia. Vol. 3. I.B. Tauris.
