= Hasan ibn Zayd =

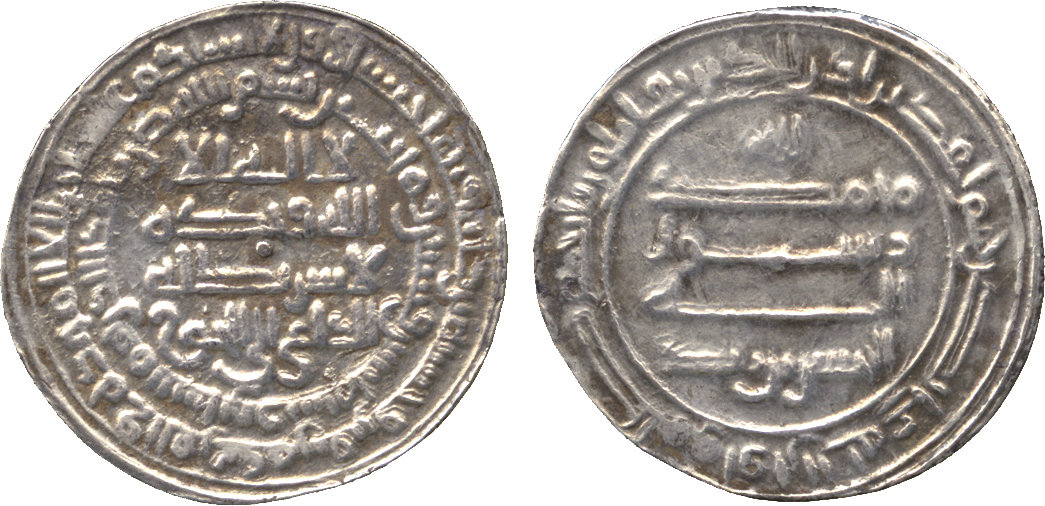
- Silver dirham issued by Hasan

Emir of Tabaristan
- Reign: 864 – 6 January 884
- Predecessor: Sulayman ibn Abdallah ibn Tahir (as Abbasid Governor)
- Successor: Muhammad ibn Zayd
- Born: Medina
- Died: 6 January 884; Amol
- Issue: One daughter (possibly)
- House: Zaydid dynasty
- Father: Zayd ibn Muhammad
- Mother: Amina bint Abd Allah
- Religion: Shi'a Islam

Abū Muḥammad al-Ḥasan ibn Zayd ibn Muḥammad ibn Ismaʿīl ibn al-Ḥasan ibn Zayd (Arabic: الحسن بن زيد بن محمد; died 6 January 884), also known as al-Dāʿī al-Kabīr (Arabic: الداعي الكبير, "the Great/Elder Missionary"), was an Alid who became the founder of the Zaydid dynasty of Tabaristan.

== Ḥasan ibn Zayd Revolt ==
Al-Ḥasan was a descendant of Hasan ibn Zayd ibn Hasan, a great-grandson of Ali, the son-in-law of Muhammad and fourth Caliph. In 864, he was living in Ray in northern Iran, when he was invited by pro-Alid elements in the neighbouring province of Tabaristan to join them in a revolt against the Abbasid authorities.

Tabaristan, a mountainous region on the southern shore of the Caspian Sea, had remained largely untouched by the Muslim conquests of the 7th century. Until conquered by the Abbasid Caliphate in 759/60, it had been ruled by a native Iranian dynasty of Caspian origins, the Dabuyids, and even after the imposition of direct Muslim rule local dynasties retained a large measure of autonomy in the mountainous interior. It was only after 840, when Tabaristan came under Tahirid rule (the Abbasids' viceroys for the East), that the Islamization of the province began. It proceeded rapidly, and although the majority of the people adopted Sunni Islam, the province offered opportunities for the activities of pro-Alid Shi'ite missionaries as well.

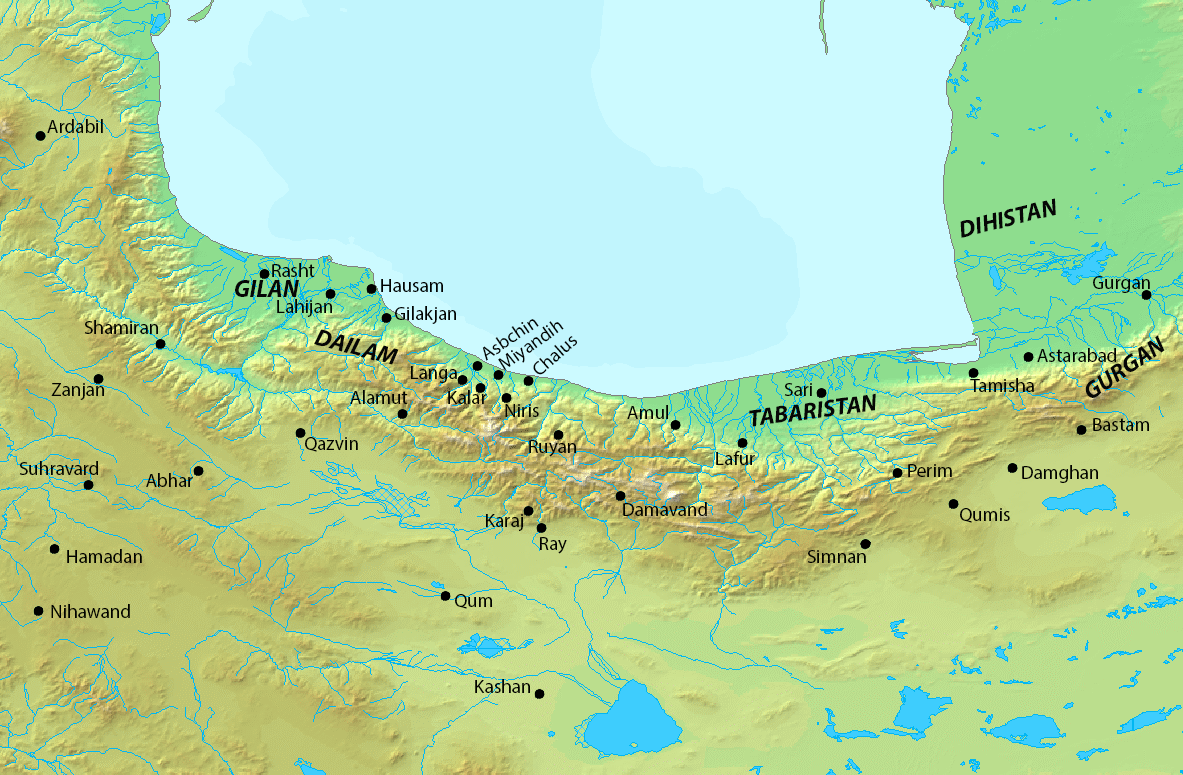
Map of northern Iran

In the 860s, western Iran was governed by the Tahirid Muhammad ibn Abdallah ibn Tahir, whose brother Sulayman ibn Abdallah ibn Tahir deputized him in Tabaristan and Gurgan. Popular resentment of the Tahirids' rule increased through the oppression of their officials, especially their fiscal agents in the province. Consequently, in 864 a rebellion broke out in the towns of Ruyan, Kalar and Chalus, led by two "sons of Rustam". The rebels called upon Hasan to lead them, and allied themselves with the neighbouring Daylamites. Hasan, who assumed the regnal name al-Dāʿī ilaʾl-Ḥaqq ("He who summons to the Truth"), was recognized as emir by a part of the local population, and even secured the allegiance of the Justanid king of Daylam, Vahsudan ibn Marzuban.

Despite the rapid success of the rebellion, Hasan's reign was troubled due to repeated invasions, and he was several times forced to seek refuge in Daylam. Thus he was chased out of Tabaristan in 865 by Sulayman ibn Abdallah, but returned within the same year and recovered the province. Another Alid revolt occurred in Qazvin and Zanjan in 865, led by Husayn ibn Ahmad al-Kaukabi and aided by the Justanids, but it was suppressed two years later by the Abbasid general Musa ibn Bugha. Hasan was forced into Daylam again by the Abbasid general Muflih in 869, but the latter withdrew shortly after. In 874, Hasan came into conflict with Ya'qub al-Saffar for sheltering one of the latter's enemies, Abdallah al-Sijzi. Ya'qub invaded Tabaristan and defeated the Zaydid forces at Sari, forcing Hasan once again to flee to the mountains of Daylam. Nevertheless, Ya'qub's army soon became bogged down by torrential rainfall and suffered many casualties to disease in the unaccustomed subtropical climate of Tabaristan, forcing him to withdraw from the region shortly after. In the complex struggle for control of Khurasan between Abu Talha Mansur ibn Sharkab and Ahmad ibn Abdallah al-Khujistani, Hasan sided with the former, but was defeated with him in 878/879, when al-Khujistani recovered Nishapur. Exploiting the turmoils of the period, from 867 Hasan also usually controlled Gurgan to the east, and expanded his control temporarily over some neighbouring regions as well: Rayy (864–865, 867, 870 and 872), Qazvin (865–868) and Qumis (873–879).

Hasan died at Amul in 884, and was succeeded by his brother Muhammad ibn Zayd. The Zaydids continued to rule Tabaristan until 928. Historians praised him as a just and equitable ruler, but outside the early strongholds of Ruyan and Kalar, the initial enthusiasm for his rule seems to have waned quickly among the broad populace of Tabaristan and Gurgan. This was a result of both his ardent enforcement of Shi'ism and repression of the Sunni majority, as well as his regime's reliance on the semi-barbarous Daylamite soldiery. Relations with the autonomous local Iranian rulers also varied: the Qarinids, who ruled the western mountains of Tabaristan, supported Hasan, but the Bavandids in the eastern mountains were usually hostile, and relations with the Justanid Vahsudan and his son and successor Khurshid also turned hostile. In the event, Hasan managed to have the latter replaced by his brother Justan, who once again loyally supported the Zaydid ruler. The Orientalist Frants Buhl assesses Hasan's character thus: he "possessed rare energy and the capacity for stubborn resistance, was a sincerely religious man, well educated, and a patron of letters".

== See also ==
- Caspian expeditions of the Rus'

== Sources ==
- Bosworth, C.E. (1975). "The Ṭāhirids and Ṣaffārids". In Frye, Richard N. (ed.). The Cambridge History of Iran: From the Arab Invasion to the Saljuqs. Vol. 4. Cambridge: Cambridge University Press. ISBN 0-521-20093-8.
- Buhl, Fr. (1971). "al-Ḥasan b. Zayd b. Muḥammad". In Lewis, B.; Ménage, V. L.; Pellat, Ch. & Schacht, J. (eds.). The Encyclopaedia of Islam, Second Edition. Volume III: H–Iram. Leiden: E. J. Brill. p. 245. doi:10.1163/1573-3912_islam_SIM_2758. OCLC 495469525.
- Madelung, W. (1975). "The Minor Dynasties of Northern Iran". In Frye, Richard N. (ed.). The Cambridge History of Iran: From the Arab Invasion to the Saljuqs. Vol. 4. Cambridge: Cambridge University Press. pp. 198–249. ISBN 0-521-20093-8.
