= Shurṭa =

Police of the Arab Caliphates

Shurṭa (Arabic: شرطة, from Latin cohors) is the common Arabic term for police. Its literal meaning is that of a "picked" or elite force. The shurṭa or police force were established in the early days of the Caliphate, perhaps as early as the caliphate of Uthman (644–656). In the Umayyad and the Abbasid Caliphates, the shurṭa had considerable power, and its head, the ṣāḥib ash-shurṭa (Arabic: صاحب الشرطة), was an important official, whether at the provincial level or in the central government.

The duties of the shurṭa varied with time and place: it was primarily a police or the secret police and internal security force and also had judicial functions, but it could also be entrusted with suppressing brigandage, enforcing the ḥisbah, customs and tax duties, rubbish collection, acting as a bodyguard for governors, etc.

In the Abbasid East, the chief of police also supervised the prison system. Shurṭa is one of the secret police agencies and officials of the Abbasid caliphs which was headquartered in Baghdad in the 8th and 9th centuries.

From the 10th century, the importance of the shurṭa declined, along with the power of the central government: the army, now dominated by foreign military castes (ghilmān or mamālīk), assumed the internal security role, and the cities regained a measure of self-government and appropriated the more local tasks of the shurṭa such as that of the night watch.

== See also ==
- Qadi
- Mazalim
- Haras (unit)

== Sources ==
- Nielsen, J.S. (1997). "S̲h̲urṭa". In Bosworth, C. E.; van Donzel, E.; Heinrichs, W. P. & Lecomte, G. (eds.). The Encyclopaedia of Islam, Second Edition. Volume IX: San–Sze. Leiden: E. J. Brill. p. 510. ISBN 978-90-04-10422-8.
