= Ishaq ibn Musa ibn Isa al-Hashimi =

Abbasid governor of Yemen

Abbasid governor of Yemen
- In office 814–815
- Monarch: Al-Ma'mun
- Preceded by: Umar ibn Ibrahim ibn Waqid al-Umari
- Succeeded by: Hamdawayh ibn Ali ibn Isa ibn Mahan

Amir al-hajj
- In office c. 817
- Monarch: Al-Ma'mun

Personal details
- Parent: Musa ibn Isa ibn Musa al-Hashimi (father)
- Relatives: Al-Abbas ibn Musa (brother)
- Military career
- Allegiance: Abbasid Caliphate
- Branch: Abbasid army

Isḥāq ibn Mūsā ibn ʿĪsā al-Hāshimī (Arabic: إسحاق بن موسى بن عيسى الهاشمي) was a ninth century Abbasid personage and governor of the Yemen.

== Career ==
A member of the Banu al-Abbas, Ishaq was the son of Musa ibn Isa and grandson to Isa ibn Musa. He was a third cousin of the caliphs al-Amin (r. 809–813), al-Ma'mun (r. 813–833), and al-Mu'tasim (r. 833–842).

In 814 Ishaq was appointed to the Yemen by al-Ma'mun, and he arrived in the province that summer. He remained in the Yemen until the following year, when he learned that nearby Mecca had been occupied by the Alid rebel Hasan ibn Husayn ibn al-Aftas. Ishaq responded by organizing an expedition to recover the city for the caliph and began marching for the Hijaz, but he suffered an attack by Bedouin en route and was forced to retreat back to Sana'a. A short time later, he learned that another Alid, Ibrahim ibn Musa al-Kadhim, was advancing toward the Yemen to take control of the country, and decided not to offer any resistance to the rebels. He therefore departed, together with all of his cavalry and infantry, along the Najd Road, effectively surrendering the province to Ibrahim.

Following his departure from the Yemen, Ibrahim headed in the direction of Mecca, where Muhammad ibn Ja'far al-Sadiq had been proclaimed as anti-caliph, and eventually reached Mushash, where he encamped. There he was joined by his mother and several Abbasid loyalists who managed to escape from the city, and he proceeded to engage the rebels in battle for several days. After failing to defeat the Alid forces, he decided to withdraw and make his way toward Iraq, but along the way he was met by reinforcements led by Warqa' ibn Jamil and convinced to turn back around. The combined forces met the rebels at Bi'r Maymun near Mecca and scored a victory, putting the rebels to flight after two days of combat. Muhammad ibn Ja'far then decided to evacuate Mecca, allowing Warqa' and Ishaq to enter it in early 816 and reestablish government control.

Ishaq may have subsequently led the pilgrimage of 817.

== Notes ==
Political offices
| Preceded by Umar ibn Ibrahim ibn Waqid al-Umari | Abbasid governor of the Yemen; 814–815 | Succeeded by Ibrahim ibn Musa al-Jazzar (rebel) |
