= Yazid =

Yazid يزيد
- Pronunciation: [jaziːd], "Yazeed"
- Gender: Male

Origin
- Origin: Arabic
- Meaning: Addition, Increase
- Region of origin: Arabia (Middle East)

Yazīd (Arabic: يزيد, "increasing", "adding more") is an Arabic name and may refer to:

== Given name ==
- Yazid I (647–683), second Umayyad Caliph
- Yazid II (687–724), Umayyad caliph
- Yazid III (701–744), Umayyad caliph
- Yazeed Abulaila (born 1993), Jordanian footballer
- Yazid Kaïssi (born 1981), French-born Moroccan footballer
- Yazid Mansouri (born 1978), French-born Algerian footballer
- Yazid ibn al-Muhallab (672–720), Umayyad governor
- Yazid of Morocco (1750–1792), Sultan of Morocco
- Yazid Sabeg (born 1950), French businessman
- Yazid ibn Abi Sufyan (died 640), brother of the early Umayyad leader Muawiyah I, and companion of Muhammad
- Yazid Sufaat (born 1964), suspected militant
- Yazid Zerhouni (1937-2020), Algerian politician
- Zinedine Zidane (Zinedine Yazid Zidane, born 1972), French footballer and manager
- Yazid bin Abdul Qadir Jawas (born 1963), Indonesian Salafist preacher.
- Yazid ibn Umar al-Fazari (died 750)
- Yazid ibn Hatim al-Muhallabi (died 787)
- Yazid ibn Abdallah al-Hulwani (fl. 856–867), Abbasid military governor of Egypt
- Yazid ibn Mazyad al-Shaybani (died c. 801), Abbasid military general and governor
- Yazid ibn Asid ibn Zafir al-Sulami (fl. 750–780), Abbasid military general in Armenia
- Yazid ibn al-Sa'iq
- Yazid ibn Jarir al-Qasri
- Yazid ibn Abi Kabsha al-Saksaki
- Yazid ibn Ziyad
- Yazid ibn Khalid al-Qasri
- Yazid ibn Abi Muslim

== Surname ==
- Abu Yazid (873–947), Kharijite Berber of the Banu Ifran tribe
- Afiq Yazid (born 1991), Malaysian racing driver
- Mhamed Yazid (1923–2003), Algerian independence activist and politician

== See also ==
- Yazidis, an ethnoreligious group
- Yezidi (script), a historic Kurdish alphabet
  - Yezidi (Unicode block), a Unicode block containing letters of the Yezidi script
