= Umar ibn Ibrahim ibn Waqid al-Umari =

Abbasid governor of Yemen (813 – 814)

Umar ibn Ibrahim ibn Waqid al-Umari عمر بن إبراهيم بن واقد العمري)

Governor of Yemen
- In office 813–814
- Preceded by: Yazid al-Qasri
- Succeeded by: al-Qasim ibn Isma'il, later by Ishaq ibn Musa

Personal details
- Born: Arabia, Abbasid Caliphate
- Died: 820s or late 830s Hejaz, Abbasid Caliphate
- Relations: Banu Adi (tribe)
- Parent: Ibrahim ibn Waqid al-Adi
- Relatives: Waqid ibn Muhammad (grandfather); Muhammad ibn Zayd (great-grandfather); Abd Allah (great great-grandfather)

Military service
- Allegiance: Abbasid Caliphate
- Years of service: 810s

Umar ibn Ibrahim ibn Waqid al-Umari (Arabic: عمر بن إبراهيم بن واقد العمري) was a ninth-century governor of the Yemen for the Abbasid Caliphate from 813 to mid-814 CE.

== Career ==
Umar was a member of Banu Adi clan of the Quraysh, to which both the ruling Abbasids and Banu Adi belong. He was a direct descendant of the second Rashidun caliph Umar ibn al-Khattab, Shortly after the death of al-Amin in 813, word of Yazid al-Qasri's maltreatment of the abna reached new caliph al-Ma'mun, who responded by stripping him of the governorship. Following his dismissal, he was arrested in Sana'a by his successor Umar and thrown into prison.

After Umar was appointed as governor shortly after the death of the caliph al-Amin. He remained in office for less than a year, during which time he carried out instructions to arrest his predecessor Yazid ibn Jarir al-Qasri, and was dismissed in mid-814. Umar was replaced al-Qasim ibn Isma'il, who was later replaced by Ishaq ibn Musa in 814, when Ishaq was appointed to the Yemen by al-Ma'mun, and he arrived in the province that summer. He remained in the Yemen until the following year, when he learned that nearby Mecca had been occupied by the Alid rebel Hasan ibn Husayn ibn al-Aftas. Ishaq responded by organizing an expedition to recover the city for the caliph and began marching for the Hijaz, but he suffered an attack by Bedouin en route and was forced to retreat back to Sana'a. A short time later, he learned that another Alid, Ibrahim ibn Musa al-Kadhim, was advancing toward the Yemen to take control of the country, and decided not to offer any resistance to the rebels. Ishaq therefore departed, together with all of his cavalry and infantry, along the Najd Road, effectively surrendering the province to Ibrahim..

== Notes ==
Political offices
Preceded by Yazid ibn Jarir al-Qasri	Abbasid governor of the Yemen; 813–814	Succeeded by Ishaq ibn Musa ibn Isa al-Hashimi
