= Muhammad ibn Abdallah ibn Malik al-Khuza'i =

Abbasid governor of Yemen (810–811)

Muhammad ibn Abdallah ibn Malik al-Khuza'i محمد بن عبد الله بن مالك الخزاعي

Abbasid Governor of Yemen
- In office 810–811
- Monarch: al-Amin
- Preceded by: Hammad al-Barbari
- Succeeded by: Muhammad ibn Sa'id al-Kinani

Personal details
- Died: Abbasid Caliphate
- Parent: Abdallah ibn Malik

Muhammad ibn Abdallah ibn Malik al-Khuza'i (Arabic: محمد بن عبد الله بن مالك الخزاعي) was a ninth-century governor of the Yemen for the Abbasid Caliphate.

He was appointed as governor during the caliphate of al-Amin (r. 809–813) in an attempt to placate the Yemenis, following complaints about the unpopular administration of his predecessor Hammad al-Barbari. After arriving in the Yemen, he acted against Hammad's agents in the various districts of the province by confiscating their wealth, thereby winning the approval of the local population. He remained governor until mid-811, when he was dismissed in favor of Muhammad ibn Sa'id al-Kinani.

== Notes ==
Political offices
Preceded by Hammad al-Barbari	Abbasid governor of the Yemen c. 810–811	Succeeded by Muhammad ibn Sa'id al-Kinani
