= Hisn ibn al-Minhal =

Hisn ibn al-Minhal (Arabic: حصن بن المنهال; variant forms include Hafs and al-Husayn ibn Minhal) was a ninth-century governor of the Yemen for the Abbasid Caliphate.

Hisn was appointed as resident governor on behalf of Isa ibn Yazid al-Juludi, when the latter departed the province shortly after the capture of Hamdawayh ibn Ali ibn Isa ibn Mahan in 820. He was eventually succeeded by Ibrahim al-Ifriqi.

== Notes ==
Political offices
Preceded by Isa ibn Yazid al-Juludi	Abbasid governor of the Yemen; 820	Succeeded by Ibrahim al-Ifriqi
