= Isa ibn Yazid al-Juludi =

9th-century Abbasid governor and military commander

Isa ibn Yazid al-Juludi عيسى بن يزيد الجلودي

Abbasid Governor of Yemen
- In office 820–820
- Monarch: al-Ma'mun
- Preceded by: Hamdawayh ibn Ali ibn Isa ibn Mahan
- Succeeded by: Hisn ibn al-Minhal

Abbasid Governor of Egypt
- In office 827–829
- Monarch: al-Ma'mun
- Preceded by: Abdallah ibn Tahir
- Succeeded by: Umayr ibn al-Walid

Abbasid Governor of Egypt
- In office 829–830
- Monarch: al-Ma'mun
- Preceded by: Umayr ibn al-Walid
- Succeeded by: Abdawayh ibn Jabalah

Personal details
- Born: Abbasid Caliphate
- Parent: Yazid

Military service
- Allegiance: Abbasid Caliphate
- Rank: Commander

Isa ibn Yazid al-Juludi (Arabic: عيسى بن يزيد الجلودي) was a ninth century military commander for the Abbasid Caliphate. He twice served as governor of Egypt, from 827 to 829 and again from 829 to 830.

== Early career ==
In al-Tabari's chronicle, Isa first appears in 813, near the end of civil war between the rival caliphs al-Amin (r. 809–813) and al-Ma'mun (r. 813–833), as one of the individuals in al-Amin's entourage. Following al-Amin's execution in September 813, Isa entered into the service of al-Hasan ibn Sahl, who had been appointed by al-Ma'mun as governor of Baghdad, and over the next several years he participated in the struggle to maintain al-Ma'mun's authority in the central lands of the caliphate.

In 815 Isa was dispatched, together with Warqa' ibn Jamil, Hamdawayh ibn Ali, and Harun ibn al-Musayyab, to recapture Mecca, Medina and the Yemen, which had fallen to Alid rebels. Warqa' and Isa's forces advanced against Mecca and, after linking up with the deposed governor of the Yemen, defeated the anti-caliph Muhammad ibn Ja'far al-Sadiq and entered the city in early 816. A few months later Isa defeated a force sent to Mecca by Ibrahim ibn Musa al-Jazzar, who had seized control of the Yemen, and around the same time Muhammad ibn Ja'far agreed to surrender and abdicate. Isa then escorted Muhammad to al-Hasan ibn Sahl, leaving his son as his governor of Mecca.

Following al-Ma'mun's designation of the Alid Ali ibn Musa al-Rida as his successor in 817, Isa was dispatched to Basra to arrest the governor Isma'il ibn Ja'far, who had refused to obey the caliph's order to abandon the traditional Abbasid black clothing in favor of the Alid green. He then went to Mecca, where he delivered the oath of allegiance that the people were to give to Ali. Al-Ma'mun also appointed Ibrahim ibn Musa, who in the meantime had lost the Yemen to Hamdawayh ibn Ali, as governor of that province and instructed Isa to assist him in reconquering it. Isa, however, remained in Mecca and gave no support to Ibrahim, who was ultimately defeated by Hamdawayh in 818 and forced to return to Mecca.

In 820, al-Ma'mun ordered Isa to retake the Yemen from Hamdawayh, who was now considered a rebel. Isa marched south and defeated Hamdawayh on the field; the latter fled to Sana'a, but Isa pursued and captured him and took him back to al-Ma'mun. That same year, Isa was appointed by the caliph to combat the Zutt, who had rebelled in Iraq and were raiding the environs of Basra and Wasit; al-Tabari provides no details of the campaign, but the Zutt remained active until 835.

== Governorships of Egypt ==
In 827, Isa participated in Abdallah ibn Tahir's reconquest of Egypt, which brought an end to the turmoil that had plagued that country since the outbreak of the civil war. After Egypt was pacified and Abdallah departed in 827, Isa was appointed as his deputy governor of the province. When the caliph's brother Abu Ishaq (the future caliph al-Mu'tasim, r. 833–842) took Abdallah's place and assumed the governorship of Egypt in 828, he confirmed Isa as resident governor over the security and prayers. At the same time, however, Abu Ishaq transferred control of the provincial taxes, giving it to Salih ibn Shirzad.

Before long, the increased taxes and oppression that came with the re-imposition of caliphal authority in Egypt became deeply unpopular, and a rebellion broke out in the Hawf district in Lower Egypt. Isa responded to the uprising by sending his chief of security, his son Muhammad, with an army to fight the Hawfis. Muhammad, however, suffered a major defeat at Bilbays in April 829 and barely escaped with his life, while most of his men were killed. News of the defeat reached Abu Ishaq, who responded by dismissing Isa and appointing 'Umayr ibn al-Walid in his place.

'Umayr's governorship came to a sudden end in May 829, when he lost his life in battle against the rebels. With 'Umayr dead, Abu Ishaq decided to re-appoint Isa as governor, and the latter took over affairs from 'Umayr's son Muhammad. Isa then set out in a fresh attempt to quell the rebellion, but the Hawfis defeated him at Munyat Matar in September 829, and he was compelled to retreat to al-Fustat after burning his baggage.

Following Isa's defeat, the caliph al-Ma'mun decided that reinforcements were needed in Egypt and ordered Abu Ishaq to head to the province. Abu Ishaq arrived in Egypt with four thousand Turkish troops and quickly defeated the rebels in October 829. After entering Fustat in November, where he received the homage of Isa and the local notables, he continued securing the province and executed the leaders of the rebellion. By the following year the Hawfis had been pacified and Abu Ishaq departed for Syria in February 830, taking with him a large number of prisoners.

Isa did not retain the governorship of Egypt following Abu Ishaq's campaign; he was dismissed and Abdawayh ibn Jabalah was appointed in his place.

== Notes ==
Political offices
Preceded by Hamdawayh ibn Ali ibn Isa ibn Mahan	Abbasid governor of the Yemen; 820	Succeeded by Hisn ibn al-Minhal
Preceded by Abdallah ibn Tahir	Governor of Egypt; 827–829	Succeeded by Umayr ibn al-Walid
Preceded by Umayr ibn al-Walid	Governor of Egypt; 829–830	Succeeded by Abdawayh ibn Jabalah
