= Muhammad ibn Sa'id al-Kinani =

Abbasid governor of Yemen (811–812)

Muhammad ibn Sa'id al-Kinani محمد بن سعيد الكناني

Abbasid Governor of Yemen
- In office 811–812
- Preceded by: Muhammad ibn Abdallah ibn Malik al-Khuza'i
- Succeeded by: Yazid ibn Jarir al-Qasri

Personal details
- Died: Abbasid Caliphate
- Parent: Sa'id ibn al-Sarh

Muhammad ibn Sa'id ibn al-Sarh al-Kinani (Arabic: محمد بن سعيد بن السرح الكناني), alternatively given as Sa'id ibn Sarh, was a ninth-century governor of the Yemen for the Abbasid Caliphate.

A member of the ahl Filastin ("people of Palestine"), Ibn al-Sarh was appointed to the Yemen during the caliphate of al-Amin (r. 809–813). Although little is known of his administration, by the time he left office he had accumulated a large amount of wealth, which he took with him when he departed from the province during the Fourth Fitna. He then returned to Palestine, and is subsequently mentioned as seizing control of al-Ramlah during the chaos of the Fitna.

== Notes ==
Political offices
Preceded by Muhammad ibn 'Abdallah ibn Malik al-Khuza'i	Abbasid governor of the Yemen; 811–c. 812	Succeeded by Yazid ibn Jarir al-Qasri
