= Maridah bint Shabib =

Mother of Abbasid caliph al-Mu'tasim

Maridah bint Shabib ماردة بنت شبيب

Umm walad of the Abbasid caliph
- Period: 796 – 809
- Born: Kufa, Abbasid Caliphate
- Died: 820s Baghdad, Abbasid Caliphate
- Burial: Baghdad
- Spouse: Harun al-Rashid
- Children: Abu Ishaq Muhammad ibn Harun al-Rashid; Abu Isma'il ibn Harun al-Rashid; Umm Habib bint Harun al-Rashid
Names
- Umm Muhammad Maridah bint Shabib
- Religion: Islam

Maridah bint Shabib (Arabic: ماردة بنت شبيب, d. 820s) was the favourite Umm walad of Abbasid caliph Harun al-Rashid and mother of eighth Abbasid caliph al-Mu'tasim.

== Biography ==
Maridah entered the Abbasid harem probably in 793/795. She was raised in the Abbasid household before kept her as concubine. Maridah was a slave and she belonged to a Muslim family, other members of her family were also slaves.

Maridah's father was Shabib. She was of Turkic origin and it is believed that she was born in Kufa.

She was one of the ten maids presented to Harun by Zubaidah. She had five children. These were Abu Ishaq (future Caliph Al-Mu'tasim), Abu Isma'il, Umm Habib, and two others whose names are unknown. She was Harun's favourite concubine.

Her son, Muhammad, the future al-Mu'tasim, was born in the Khuld ("Eternity") Palace in Baghdad, but the exact date is unclear: according to the historian al-Tabari (839–923), his birth was placed either in Sha'ban AH 180 (October 796 CE), or in AH 179 (Spring 796 CE or earlier).

Maridah was the only Umm walad of Harun al-Rashid, who gave birth to his five children no other Umm walad had this prestige.

Maridah lived most of her life in the Caliph's Harem. Her sons were not in the line of succession as Harun al-Rashid kept his eldest sons as heirs. However, Maridah's elder son Abu Ishaq became caliph after his half-brother al-Mamun's death. Al-Mamun nominated Abu Ishaq as his successor on his death bed.

== Sources ==
- Masudi (2010) [1989]. The Meadows of Gold: The Abbasids. Translated by Paul Lunde and Caroline Stone. London and New York: Routledge. ISBN 978-0-7103-0246-5.
- Bosworth, C. E. (1993). "al-Muʿtaṣim Bi'llāh". In Bosworth, C. E.; van Donzel, E.; Heinrichs, W. P. & Pellat, Ch. (eds.). The Encyclopaedia of Islam, Second Edition. Volume VII: Mif–Naz. Leiden: E. J. Brill. p. 776. ISBN 978-90-04-09419-2.
- Kennedy, Hugh (2006). When Baghdad Ruled the Muslim World: The Rise and Fall of Islam's Greatest Dynasty. Cambridge, Massachusetts: Da Capo Press. ISBN 978-0-306814808.
- Abbott, Nabia (1946). Two Queens of Baghdad: Mother and Wife of Hārūn Al Rashīd. University of Chicago Press. ISBN 978-0-86356-031-6.
- Bosworth, C. E., ed. (1991). The History of al-Ṭabarī, Volume XXXIII: Storm and Stress Along the Northern Frontiers of the ʿAbbāsid Caliphate: The Caliphate of al-Muʿtasim, A.D. 833–842/A.H. 218–227. SUNY Series in Near Eastern Studies. Albany, New York: State University of New York Press. ISBN 978-0-7914-0493-5.
