= Salmawaih ibn Bunan =

Physician and translator of Greek medical texts

Salmawaih ibn Bunan (died 840) was an Church of the East Christian physician who translated works of Galen from Greek into Arabic. He flourished at the time of the Abbasid caliphs al-Ma'mun (r. 813–833) and al-Mu'tasim (r. 833–842), serving as private physician to the latter. It is reported that al-Mu'tasim trusted Salmawaih to such an extent that he called him "father", and that he prayed in person over Salmawaih's grave when he died.

He was a patron of the fellow Christian physician and translator Hunayn ibn Ishaq, helping him in his translation of Galen's On The Therapeutic Method. His scientific work included studies on the harmful effects of aphrodisiacs. He was a rival of the Christian physician Ibn Masawayh.

== Sources ==
- Bosworth, C. E., ed. (1991). The History of al-Ṭabarī, Volume XXXIII: Storm and Stress Along the Northern Frontiers of the ʿAbbāsid Caliphate: The Caliphate of al-Muʿtasim, A.D. 833–842/A.H. 218–227. SUNY Series in Near Eastern Studies. Albany, New York: State University of New York Press. ISBN 978-0-7914-0493-5.
- Sarton, George (1927). Introduction to the History of Science, Volume I. From Homer to Omar Khayyam. Baltimore: Carnegie Institution of Washington. OCLC 874972552.
