= Umayr ibn al-Walid =

Abbasid governor of Egypt (829)

Umayr ibn al-Walid al-Badhghisi al-Tamimi (Arabic: عمير بن الوليد الباذغيسي التميمي) was an early ninth-century governor of Egypt for the Abbasid Caliphate, serving there from April 829 until he was killed while fighting an anti-tax rebellion a few months later.

== Career ==
Umayr was appointed resident governor of Egypt in April 829 by Abu Ishaq (the future caliph al-Mu'tasim, r. 833–842) following the failure of the previous governor 'Isa ibn Yazid al-Juludi to defeat an uprising of the tribal Arabs in the Hawf district. Umayr quickly began preparing for a campaign against the Hawfis, although he suffered a setback when 'Abdallah ibn Hulays/Jalis, who had been sent to pacify the Qaysi Arabs, defected to their side instead. Despite this, he set out from al-Fustat with his troops and the former governor 'Isa, leaving his son Muhammad in charge in his absence.

The rebels, for their part, were met by envoys sent by the caliph al-Ma'mun (r. 813–833), but they refused to back down and proceeded to march against Umayr. The two sides met near the end of May 829; Umayr commanded the government army, while on the rebels' side the Qaysis were now led by Ibn Hulays and the Yamanis were under 'Abd al-Salam al-Judhami. The resulting battle initially went favorably for Umayr, with many of the Hawfis being killed and the remainder forced to retreat. The rebels, however, laid an ambush, and when Umayr attempted to pursue them he fell into the trap and was killed.

== Notes ==
Preceded by Isa ibn Yazid al-Juludi	Governor of Egypt; 829	Succeeded by Isa ibn Yazid al-Juludi
