= Ibrahim al-Ifriqi =

Governor of the Abbasid Caliphate

Ibrahim al-Ifriqi (Arabic: إبراهيم الإفريقي) was a ninth-century governor of the Yemen for the Abbasid Caliphate.

A member of the Banu Shayban, Ibrahim was appointed as governor during the caliphate of al-Ma'mun (r. 813–833), in place of Hisn ibn al-Minhal. He was in turn eventually replaced by the joint governors Nu'aym ibn al-Waddah al-Azdi and al-Muzaffar ibn Yahya al-Kindi.

== Notes ==
Political offices
Preceded by Hisn ibn al-Minhal	Abbasid governor of the Yemen; 820–821	Succeeded by Nu'aym ibn al-Waddah al-Azdi and al-Muzaffar ibn Yahya al-Kindi
