= Ibrahim ibn Musa al-Kazim =

Son of Musa al-Kazim

Ibrahim ibn Musa al-Kazim إبراهيم بن موسى الكاظم
- Born: 763; Medina, Abbasid Caliphate
- Died: 825 / after 837; Baghdad, Abbasid Caliphate
- Children: Isma'il; Ja'far; Musa al-Thani
- Parent: Musa al-Kazim (father)

Governor of Mecca
- In office 817–820
- Monarch: al-Ma'mun
- Preceded by: Ubaydallah ibn al-Abbas ibn Ubaydallah
- Succeeded by: Ubaydallah ibn al-Hasan al-Talibi

Amir al-Hajj
- In office 818
- Monarch: al-Ma'mun

Governor of Yemen
- In office 817
- Monarch: al-Ma'mun
- Preceded by: Hamdawayh ibn Ali
- Succeeded by: Hamdawayh ibn Ali

Ibrāhīm ibn Mūsā al-Kāẓim (Arabic: إبراهيم بن موسى الكاظم), known as al-Murtaḍā (Arabic: المرتضی, lit. 'the Attainer of God´s pleasure'), died 825 or after 837, was a ninth century Alid leader who led a rebellion against the Abbasid Caliphate in the Yemen in the aftermath of the Fourth Fitna. He later seized control of Mecca in ca. 817, and was subsequently recognized as legal governor of the city by the caliph al-Ma'mun.

== Background ==
An Alid by birth, Ibrahim was one of the eighteen or nineteen sons of the seventh Shi'ite imam Musa al-Kazim (d. 799), and a great-great-great-great-grandson of Ali. He was a brother of the eighth imam Ali al-Rida (d. 818), who was briefly the designated heir of the Abbasid caliph al-Ma'mun (r. 813–833).

== Revolt in the Yemen ==
Ibrahim became active as a rebel following the damaging civil war of 811–813 between the rival caliphs al-Amin and al-Ma'mun, which had greatly weakened the ability of the Abbasid government to maintain its authority in Baghdad and the provinces of the empire. While in Mecca in 815, he was appointed by Abu al-Saraya al-Sari ibn Mansur, who had launched a pro-Alid revolt in southern Iraq and seized the cities of al-Kufah, al-Basrah, Mecca, and Medina, to conquer the Yemen on his behalf, and he accordingly marched south toward the province with a large force. Upon learning of his advance, the governor of the Yemen, Ishaq ibn Musa ibn Isa al-Hashimi, decided against putting up any resistance and instead withdrew with his troops for the Hijaz, in effect surrendering the province to Ibrahim. The latter was consequently able to enter the Yemen without facing any significant resistance, and he proceeded to occupy Sana'a in September 815 and take control of the country.

Ibrahim was able to maintain his hold over the Yemen for approximately a year, during which time he minted coins in his own name. His severe administration of the province, which was characterized by frequent killings, acts of enslavement, and confiscations of private property, soon caused him to develop a reputation for brutality, and he became known by the title of al-Jazzar ("the Butcher"). Especially harsh measures were taken on behalf of his tribal allies, who assisted him in his rule of the country, and at their request he arrested several chiefs of their rivals, killing several of them and forcing others into exile.

After spending several months in the Yemen, Ibrahim attempted to assert his authority over Mecca as well, and dispatched an army to the city to lead the pilgrimage of 816 in the name of the Alids. Upon their arrival at Mecca, however, his forces were unable to enter the city due to the presence of Abbasid reinforcements, and instead took to conducting raiding activities in the neighboring area until they were defeated and dispersed. Soon afterwards, Ibrahim learned that another army under the command of Hamdawayh ibn Ali ibn Isa ibn Mahan was marching toward the Yemen in order to reassert government control over the province, and he set out with his own men to halt Hamdawayh's advance. In the resulting engagement, Ibrahim was defeated and put to flight, and Hamdawayh was able to enter Sana'a and establish himself as governor, putting an end to Alid rule of the province.

== Seizure of Mecca ==
Ibrahim's movements in the aftermath of his defeat against Hamdawayh are reported differently by various sources; al-Yaq'ubi states that he went straight to Mecca, while Yemeni writers claim that he remained in the province until 818, during which period he undertook punitive actions against a number of tribes that opposed him. It may have been around this time that he destroyed al-Khaniq, a sixth-century dam near Sa'dah built by a mawla of Sayf ibn Dhi Yazan, and devastated the old town of Sa'dah as well. At some point, however, he decided to depart from the Yemen and set out with his supporters, traveling north until he reached the outskirts of Mecca. In response to his approach, the officer in command of the city, Yazid ibn Muhammad al-Makhzumi, came out to face him, but the rebels defeated him in battle, killing him and routing his forces. With the defeat of Yazid, Ibrahim was free to enter Mecca and occupy it, and he established himself as master of the city and surrounding territory.

== Rapprochement with al-Ma'mun and governorship ==
A change in Ibrahim's relationship with the Abbasid government occurred in 817, when the caliph al-Ma'mun decided to show favoritism to the Alids and designated Ibrahim's brother Ali ibn Musa al-Rida as his heir to the caliphate, while at the same time pardoning several Alids who had rebelled against him. Toward this end, the central government reconciled with Ibrahim, who was still in Mecca, and formally gave him control of the city by recognizing him as its governor. With his rule over Mecca now legitimized, Ibrahim implemented the caliph's pro-Alid policy in the city and rendered the oath of allegiance to Ali. A short time later he headed the pilgrimage of 818 and invoked his brother in the prayers as heir to al-Ma'mun, making him, according to Al-Masudi, the first descendant of Abu Talib to lead the pilgrimage since the coming of Islam.

In addition to receiving legal control over Mecca, Ibrahim was granted the governorship of the Yemen, which was still in the hands of Hamdawayh ibn Ali. When Hamdawayh refused to yield the province, however, Ibrahim decided to dislodge him by force and organized an expedition against him. He soon reached the Yemen in mid-818 and made his way toward Sana'a, but he was met by Hamdawayh and his forces as he approached the town. The battle that followed went badly for Ibrahim, whose army was routed by Hamdawayh's, and he was forced to retreat back to the Hijaz, abandoning his hopes to recover the province.

Following his defeat in the Yemen, Ibrahim returned to Mecca, where he remained until 820. In that year he was dispatched to Baghdad by the military commander Isa ibn Yazid al-Juludi, and Ubaydallah ibn al-Hasan al-Talibi was appointed as governor of the city in his place.

== Death ==
Ibrahim died in Baghdad, reportedly from poisoning, and was buried next to his father in the graveyard of Quraysh in al-Kazimiyyah. Various dates are given for his death, including in 825 and after 837.

== Citations ==
Preceded by Ishaq ibn Musa ibn Isa al-Hashimi	Rebel governor of the Yemen; 815–816	Succeeded by Hamdawayh ibn Ali ibn Isa ibn Mahan
