= Yazid ibn Jarir al-Qasri =

Abbasid governor of Yemen (812–813)

Abbasid Governor of Yemen
- In office 812–813
- Preceded by: Muhammad ibn Sa'id al-Kinani
- Succeeded by: Umar ibn Ibrahim ibn Waqid al-Umari

Personal details
- Parent: Jarir ibn Yazid
- Relatives: Yazid ibn Khalid (grandfather)

Yazid ibn Jarir ibn Yazid ibn Khalid ibn Abdallah al-Qasri (Arabic: يزيد بن جرير بن يزيد بن خالد بن عبد الله القسري) was a provincial governor for the Abbasid Caliphate, serving as governor of the Yemen from 812 to 813.

== Career ==
Yazid was a descendant of Khalid ibn Abdallah al-Qasri (died 743), the powerful governor of Iraq on behalf of the Umayyads. He is possibly to be identified with a Yazid ibn Jarir who twice served as governor of Sistan during the caliphate of Harun al-Rashid (r. 786–809), first as deputy to al-Fadl ibn Yahya in 794 and then under Ali ibn Isa ibn Mahan in 797.

During the civil war between the rival caliphs al-Amin (r. 809–813) and al-Ma'mun (r. 813–833), Yazid was appointed governor of the Yemen by al-Ma'mun's general Tahir ibn al-Husayn, with a directive to bring the province under al-Ma'mun's control. He accordingly set off for the Yemen with a large body of horsemen, and upon his arrival he convinced the Yemenis to abandon al-Amin and swear allegiance to al-Ma'mun instead. He quickly ran into problems, however, with his policy of supporting the Qahtanite Arabs of the province at the expense of the local abna, who he treated in an extremely harsh manner. Shortly after the death of al-Amin in 813, word of Yazid's maltreatment of the abna reached al-Ma'mun, who responded by stripping him of the governorship. Following his dismissal, he was arrested in Sana'a by his successor Umar ibn Ibrahim ibn Waqid al-Umari and thrown into prison.

== Notes ==
Political offices
Preceded by Muhammad ibn Sa'id al-Kinani	Abbasid governor of the Yemen; 812–813	Succeeded by Umar ibn Ibrahim ibn Waqid al-Umari
