= Hammad al-Barbari =

Abbasid general and governor

Hammad al-Barbari was an Abbasid general and governor. His name “al-Barbari” refers to his Berber origin. Ya’qubi states that he was born in Tunis.

He was originally a slave of Harun al-Rashid (r. 786–809), and was freed by him when he rose to the throne. According to al-Tabari, he was appointed as governor of Mecca and the Yemen in 800, although Ya'qubi states that he had already been governor of Yemen since 795. His tenure was 13 years according to Ya'qubi, although he and al-Tabari differ on when he was dismissed from office: according to Ya'qubi's chronology that was in 808, while al-Tabari records that he continued in office until after Harun al-Rashid's death.

His long tenure was successful in imposing order and securing the trade routes of the region, but the harshness of his rule was such that the oppressed people of Yemen sent a delegation to Harun to remove him. His very harshness provoked the uprising of the Himyarite chieftain al-Haysam ibn Abd al-Majid al-Hamdani in the Yemen, which began around 798 and lasted until the rebel leader's defeat and capture in 807.

His son, Muhammad, was a military commander who sided with Caliph al-Amin in the Fourth Fitna.

== Sources ==
- Bosworth, C. E., ed. (1989). The History of al-Ṭabarī, Volume XXX: The ʿAbbāsid Caliphate in Equilibrium: The Caliphates of Mūsā al-Hādī and Hārūn al-Rashīd, A.D. 785–809/A.H. 169–192. SUNY Series in Near Eastern Studies. Albany, New York: State University of New York Press. ISBN 978-0-88706-564-4.
- Crone, Patricia (1980). Slaves on Horses: The Evolution of the Islamic Polity. Cambridge: Cambridge University Press. ISBN 0-521-52940-9.
- Landau-Tasseron, Ella (2010). "Arabia". In Robinson, Chase F. (ed.). The New Cambridge History of Islam, Volume 1: The Formation of the Islamic World, Sixth to Eleventh Centuries. Cambridge: Cambridge University Press. pp. 397–447. ISBN 978-0-521-83823-8.
