= Yazid ibn Khalid al-Qasri =

8th-century Umayyad governor of Iraq

Umayyad Sahib al-shurta (Police chief)
- In office 744 – October 744
- Monarch: Yazid III

Personal details
- Parent: Khalid al-Qasri

Yazid ibn Khalid al-Qasri (Arabic: يزيد بن خالد القسري) was a son of the famed Khalid al-Qasri, the longtime (724–738) governor of Iraq for the Umayyads.

Due to his father's imprisonment, torture, and death at the hands of al-Walid II's governor of Iraq, Yusuf ibn Umar al-Thaqafi, during the Third Fitna he sided with Yazid III, apparently serving as his sahib al-shurta. Following Yazid III's death, he is reported as the executioner of the two underage sons of al-Walid II, and then participated in the unsuccessful revolt of the Syrians in 745 against Marwan II. He besieged Damascus, but the city was relieved by Marwan II, and Yazid was executed by the latter. His namesake grandson Yazid ibn Jarir al-Qasri was governor of the Yemen under the Abbasid caliph al-Ma'mun.

== Sources ==
- Crone, Patricia (1980). Slaves on Horses: The Evolution of the Islamic Polity (1980 ed.). Cambridge: Cambridge University Press. ISBN 978-0521229616.
- Hawting, Gerald R. (2000). The First Dynasty of Islam: The Umayyad Caliphate AD 661–750 (Second ed.). London and New York: Routledge. ISBN 0-415-24072-7.
