= Al-Mu'tasim =

8th Abbasid caliph (r. 833–842)

al-Mu'tasim المعتصم
- Khalifah; Amir al-Mu'minin
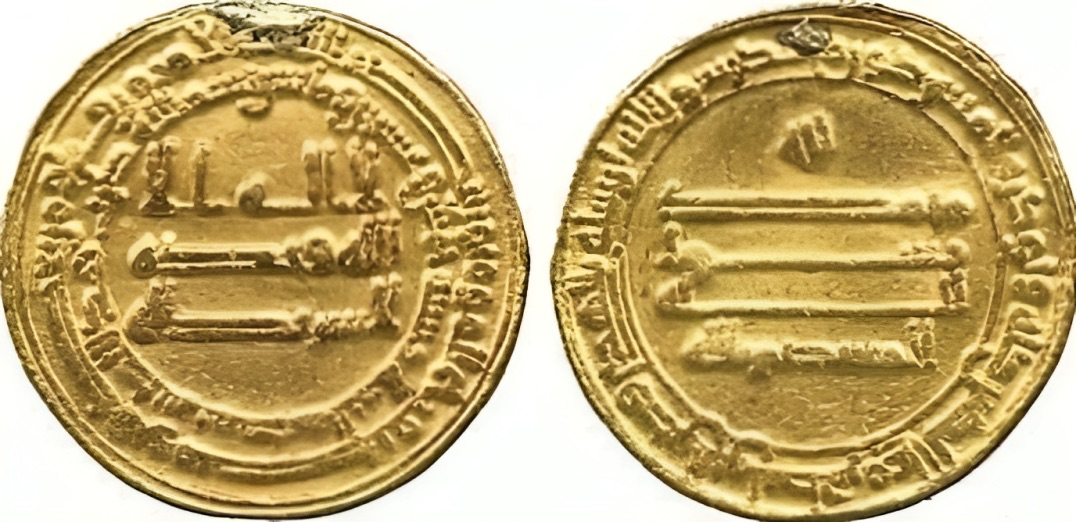
- Gold dinar of al-Mu'tasim, minted in Baghdad in 839

8th Caliph of the Abbasid Caliphate
- Reign: 9 August 833 – 5 January 842
- Predecessor: al-Ma'mun
- Successor: al-Wathiq
- Born: October 796; Khuld Palace, Baghdad, Abbasid Caliphate
- Died: 5 January 842 (aged 45); Jawsaq Palace, Samarra, Abbasid Caliphate
- Burial: Jawsaq Palace, Samarra
- Consorts: Badhal; Qaratis; Shuja; Qurut al-Ayn
- Issue: Harun al-Wathiq; Ja'far al-Mutawakkil; Muhammad; Ahmad; Al-Abbas; Aisha
Names
- Abu Ishaq 'Muhammad ibn Harun al-Rashid al-Mu'tasim bi'llah
- Dynasty: Abbasid
- Father: Harun al-Rashid
- Mother: Marida bint Shabib
- Religion: Mu'tazili Islam

Abū Isḥāq Muḥammad ibn Hārūn al-Rashīd (Arabic: أبو إسحاق محمد بن هارون الرشيد; October 796 – 5 January 842), better known by his regnal name al-Muʿtaṣim biʾllāh (المعتصم بالله, lit. 'He who seeks refuge in God'), was the eighth Abbasid caliph, ruling from 833 until his death in 842. When al-Ma'mun died unexpectedly on campaign in August 833, al-Mu'tasim was thus well placed to succeed him, with the support of the powerful chief qādī, Ahmad ibn Abi Duwad, he continued to implement the rationalist Islamic doctrine of Mu'tazilism and implementing miḥna policy.

A younger son of Caliph Harun al-Rashid (r. 786–809), he rose to prominence through his formation of a private army composed predominantly of Turkic mercenaries (ghilmān, sing. ghulām). This proved useful to his half-brother, Caliph al-Ma'mun, who employed al-Mu'tasim and his Turkic guard to counterbalance other powerful interest groups in the state, as well as employing them in campaigns against rebels and the Byzantine Empire.

Although not personally interested in literary pursuits, al-Mu'tasim also nurtured and supporting the scientific renaissance that begun under al-Ma'mun. In other ways, his reign marks a departure and a watershed moment in Islamic history, with the creation of a new regime centred on the military, and particularly his Turkic guard. In 836, a new capital was established at Samarra to symbolize this new regime and remove it from the restive populace of Baghdad.

The power of the caliphal government was increased by centralizing measures that reduced the power of provincial governors in favour of a small group of senior civil and military officials in Samarra, and the fiscal apparatus of the state was more and more dedicated to the maintenance of the professional army. The new dominance of the Turkic military elite was established by al-Mu'tasim to counterbalance the Arab and Iranian elites who had previously held many elite positions, as well as to build a professional army prepared for state expansion and the strengthening of state centralized command.

This strengthened the position of the Turks and their principal leaders, Ashinas, Wasif, Itakh, and Bugha. Another prominent member of al-Mu'tasim's inner circle, the prince of Ushrusana, al-Afshin, fell afoul of his enemies at court and was overthrown and killed in 840/1. The rise of the Turks would eventually result in the troubles of the 'Anarchy at Samarra' and led to the collapse of Abbasid power in the mid-10th century, this situation was caused by the fact that many subsequent caliphs, especially Al-Mutawakkil lacked the competence to organize and grant political and economic rights to the Turkic military generals. But, the ghulām-based political military system inaugurated by al-Mu'tasim would be widely adopted throughout the Muslim world.

Al-Mu'tasim's reign was marked by continuous warfare and at the same time of several significant strategic victories. The two major internal campaigns of the reign were against the long-running Khurramite uprising of Babak Khorramdin in Adharbayjan, which was suppressed by al-Afshin in 835–837, and against Mazyar, the autonomous ruler of Tabaristan, who had clashed with the Tahirid governor of Khorasan and risen up in revolt. While his Turkic generals led the fight against internal rebellions, al-Mu'tasim himself led the sole major external campaign of the period, in 838 against the Byzantine Empire. His armies defeated Emperor Theophilos and sacked the city of Amorium. The successful Amorium campaign was widely celebrated, and became a cornerstone of caliphal propaganda, cementing al-Mu'tasim's reputation as a warrior-caliph.

== Early life ==
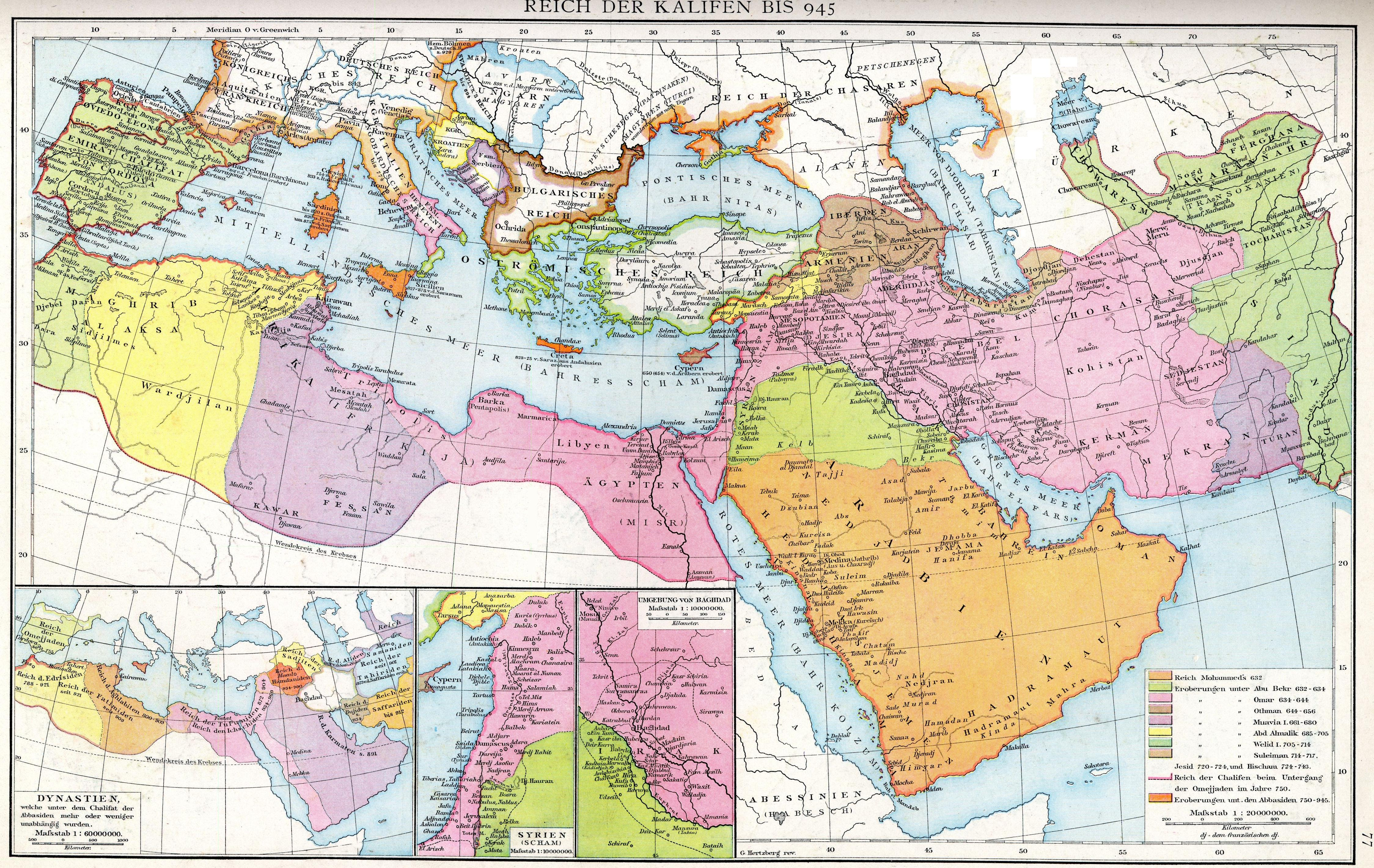
Map of the Muslim expansion during the 7th and 8th centuries and of the Muslim world under the Umayyad and early Abbasid caliphates, from the Allgemeiner historischer Handatlas of Gustav Droysen (1886)

Muhammad, the future al-Mu'tasim, was born in the Khuld ("Eternity") Palace in Baghdad, but the exact date is unclear: according to the historian al-Tabari (839–923), his birth was placed by authorities either in Sha'ban AH 180 (October 796), or in AH 179 (Spring 796 or earlier). (Note: According to the 10th-century Baghdadi historian al-Mas'udi, he was 38 years and two months old (according to the Islamic calendar) on his accession, and 46 years and ten months old when he died.) His parents were the fifth Abbasid caliph, Harun al-Rashid (r. 786–809), and Marida bint Shabib (Arabic: ماريدا بنت شبيب), a slave concubine. Marida was born in Kufa, but her family hailed from Soghdia.

The young prince's early life coincided with what, in the judgment of posterity, was the golden age of the Abbasid Caliphate. The abrupt downfall of the powerful Barmakid family, which had dominated government during the previous decades, in 803 hinted at political instability at the highest levels of the court, while provincial rebellions that were suppressed with difficulty provided warning signals about the dynasty's hold over the empire. Nevertheless, compared to the strife and division that followed in the decades after Harun's death, the Abbasid empire was living through its halcyon days. Harun still ruled directly over the bulk of the Islamic world of his time, from Central Asia and Sind in the east to the Maghreb in the west. Lively trade networks linking Tang China and the Indian Ocean with Europe and Africa passed through the caliphate, with Baghdad at their nexus, bringing immense prosperity. The revenues of the provinces kept the treasury full, allowing Harun to launch huge expeditions against the Byzantine Empire and engage in vigorous diplomacy, his envoys arriving even at the distant court of Charlemagne. This wealth also allowed considerable patronage: charitable endowments to the Muslim holy cities of Mecca and Medina and the welcoming of religious scholars and ascetics at court secured the benevolence of the religious classes towards the dynasty, while the funds lavished on poets guaranteed its lasting fame; the splendour of the caliphal court provided the inspiration for some of the earliest stories of the One Thousand and One Nights. (Note: The collection today known as the Thousand and One Nights was built over time from a foundation of 8th-century translations and adaptations of Persian and Indian material. Many of the stories added during the Abbasid period take place in Baghdad; among them is a cycle of stories around Harun al-Rashid, where he is presented as an exemplary ruler.)

== Career under al-Ma'mun ==
As an adult, Muhammad was commonly called by his kunya, Abu Ishaq. Al-Tabari describes the adult Abu Ishaq as "fair-complexioned, with a black beard the hair tips of which were red and the end of which was square and streaked with red, and with handsome eyes". Other authors stress his physical strength and his love for physical activity—an anecdote recalls how during the Amorium campaign he went ahead of the army riding on a mule and searched in person for a ford across a river—in stark contrast to his more sedentary predecessors and successors. Later authors write that he was almost illiterate, but as the historian Hugh Kennedy comments, this "would have been most improbable for an Abbasid prince", and most likely reflects his lack of interest in intellectual pursuits.

=== Activity during the civil war ===
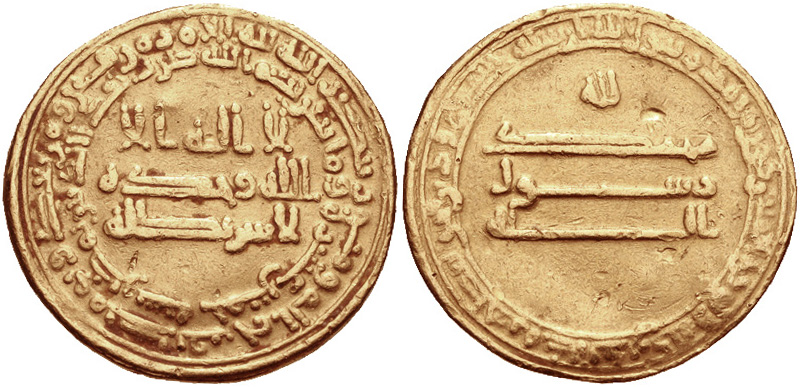
A gold dinar of al-Ma'mun, minted in Egypt in 830/1

As one of Harun's younger sons, Abu Ishaq was initially of little consequence, and did not figure in the line of succession. Soon after Harun died in 809, a vicious civil war broke out between his elder half-brothers al-Amin (r. 809–813) and al-Ma'mun (r. 813–833). Al-Amin enjoyed the backing of the traditional Abbasid elites in Baghdad (the abnāʾ al-dawla), while al-Ma'mun was supported by other sections of the abnāʾ. Al-Ma'mun emerged victorious in 813 with the surrender of Baghdad after a long siege and the death of al-Amin. Choosing to remain in his stronghold in Khurasan, on the northeastern periphery of the Islamic world, al-Ma'mun allowed his main lieutenants to rule in his stead in Iraq. This resulted in a wave of antipathy towards al-Ma'mun and his "Persian" lieutenants, both among the Abbasid elites in Baghdad and generally in the western regions of the Caliphate, culminating in the nomination of Harun al-Rashid's younger brother Ibrahim as anti-caliph at Baghdad in 817. This event made al-Ma'mun realise his inability to rule from afar; bowing to popular reaction, he dismissed or executed his closest lieutenants, and returned in person to Baghdad in 819 to begin the difficult task of rebuilding the state.

Throughout the conflict and its aftermath, Abu Ishaq remained in Baghdad. Al-Tabari records that Abu Ishaq led the Hajj pilgrimage in 816, accompanied by many troops and officials, among whom was Hamdawayh ibn Ali ibn Isa ibn Mahan, who had just been appointed to the governorship of the Yemen and was on his way there. During his stay in Mecca, his troops defeated and captured a pro-Alid (Note: The relationship between the Abbasids and the Alids was troubled and underwent many changes. The Alids, claiming descent from Muhammad's son-in-law Ali, had been the focal point of several failed revolts directed against the Umayyads—whose regime was widely regarded as oppressive and more concerned with the worldly aspects of the caliphate than the teachings of Islam—inspired by the belief that only a "chosen one from the Family of Muhammad" (al-riḍā min Āl Muḥammad) would have the divine guidance necessary to rule according to the Quran and the Sunnah and create a truly Islamic government that would bring justice to the Muslim community. However, it was the Abbasid family, who like the Alids formed part of the Banu Hashim clan and hence were members of the wider "Family of the Prophet", who seized the Caliphate in the Abbasid Revolution. In its aftermath, the Abbasids tried to secure Alid support or at least acquiescence through salaries and honours at court, but some, chiefly the Zaydi and Hasanid branches of the Alids, continued to reject the Abbasids as usurpers. Thereafter, periods of conciliatory efforts alternated with periods of suppression by the caliphs, provoking Alid uprisings which were followed in turn by large-scale persecutions of the Alids and their supporters.) leader who had raided the pilgrim caravans. He also led the pilgrimage the following year, but no details are known. It appears that at least during this time, Abu Ishaq was loyal to al-Ma'mun and his viceroy in Iraq, al-Hasan ibn Sahl, but, like most members of the dynasty and the abnāʾ of Baghdad, he supported his half-uncle Ibrahim against al-Ma'mun in 817–819.

=== Formation of the Turkish guard ===
From c. 814/5, Abu Ishaq began forming his corps of Turkish troops. The first members of the corps were domestic slaves he bought in Baghdad (the distinguished general Itakh was originally a cook) whom he trained in the art of war, but they were soon complemented by Turkish slaves sent directly from the fringes of the Muslim world in Central Asia, under an agreement with the local Samanid (Note: In c. 819, the four sons of Asad ibn Saman were awarded rule over cities in Central Asia (Samarkand, Farghana, Shash, and Herat) as a reward for their support of al-Ma'mun. These positions became hereditary in the family, marking the start of the rise of the autonomous Samanid dynasty, which by the end of the century controlled all of Khurasan and large swathes of Transoxiana.) rulers. This private force was small—it probably numbered between three and four thousand at the time of his accession to the throne—but it was highly trained and disciplined, and made Abu Ishaq a man of power in his own right, as al-Ma'mun increasingly turned to him for assistance. For the first time, special military uniforms were introduced for this praetorian Turkic guard.

The long civil war shattered the social and political order of the early Abbasid state; the abnāʾ al-dawla, the main political and military pillar of the early Abbasid state, had been much reduced by the civil war. Along with the abnāʾ, the old Arab families settled in the provinces since the time of the Muslim conquests, and the members of the extended Abbasid dynasty formed the core of the traditional elites and largely supported al-Amin. During the remainder of al-Ma'mun's reign they lost their positions in the administrative and military machinery, and with them their influence and power. Furthermore, as the civil war raged in the eastern half of the caliphate and in Iraq, the western provinces slipped from Baghdad's control in a series of rebellions that saw local strongmen claiming various degrees of autonomy or even trying to secede from the caliphate altogether. Although he had overthrown the old elites, al-Ma'mun lacked a large and loyal power base and army, so he turned to "new men" who commanded their own military retinues. These included the Tahirids, led by Abdallah ibn Tahir, and his own brother Abu Ishaq. Abu Ishaq's Turkish corps was politically useful to al-Ma'mun, who tried to lessen his own dependence on the mostly eastern Iranian leaders, such as the Tahirids, who had supported him in the civil war, and who now occupied the senior positions in the new regime. In an effort to counterbalance their influence, al-Ma'mun granted formal recognition to his brother and his Turkish corps. For the same reason he placed the Arab tribal levies of the Mashriq (the region of the Levant and Iraq) in the hands of his son, al-Abbas.

The nature and identity of the "Turkish slave soldiers", as they are commonly described, is a controversial subject; both the ethnic label and the slave status of its members are disputed, because this system granted the ghilman economic and political freedom, alongside access to land and direct cash wages. Although the bulk of the corps were clearly of servile origin, being either captured in war or purchased as slaves, in the Arabic historical sources they are never referred to as slaves (mamlūk or ʿabid), but rather as mawālī ("clients" or "freedmen") or ghilmān ("pages"), implying that they were manumitted, a view reinforced by the fact that they were paid cash salaries. Although members of the corps are collectively called simply "Turks", atrāk, in the sources, prominent early members were neither Turks nor slaves, but rather Iranian vassal princes from Central Asia like al-Afshin, prince of Usrushana, who were followed by their personal retinues (Persian chakar, Arabic shākiriyya). Likewise, the motives behind the formation of the Turkish guard action are unclear, as are the financial means available to Abu Ishaq for the purpose, particularly given his young age. The Turks were closely associated with Abu Ishaq, and are usually interpreted as a private military retinue, something not uncommon in the Islamic world of the time. As the historian Matthew Gordon points out, the sources provide some indications that the original recruitment of Turks may have been begun or encouraged by al-Ma'mun, as part of the latter's general policy of recruiting Central Asian princes—and their own military retinues—to his court. It is therefore possible that the guard was originally formed on Abu Ishaq's initiative, but that it quickly received caliphal sanction and support, in exchange for being placed under al-Ma'mun's service.

=== Service under al-Ma'mun ===
In 819 Abu Ishaq, accompanied by his Turkish guard and other commanders, was sent to suppress a Kharijite uprising under Mahdi ibn Alwan al-Haruri around Buzurj-Sabur, north of Baghdad. According to a most likely fanciful story provided by the 10th-century chronicler al-Tabari, Ashinas, in later years one of the chief Turkish leaders, received his name when he placed himself between a Kharijite lancer about to attack the future caliph, shouting, "Recognize me!" (in Persian "ashinas ma-ra").

In 828, al-Ma'mun appointed Abu Ishaq as governor of Egypt and Syria in place of Abdallah ibn Tahir, who departed to assume the governorship of Khurasan, while the Jazira and the frontier zone (thughūr) with the Byzantine Empire passed to al-Abbas. Ibn Tahir had just brought Egypt back under caliphal authority and pacified it after the tumult of the civil war, but the situation remained volatile. When Abu Ishaq's deputy in Egypt, Umayr ibn al-Walid, tried to raise taxes, the Nile Delta and Hawf regions revolted. In 830, Umayr tried to forcibly subdue the rebels, but was ambushed and killed along with many of his troops. With the government troops confined to the capital, Fustat, Abu Ishaq intervened in person, at the head of his 4,000 Turks. The rebels were soundly defeated and their leaders executed.

In July–September 830, al-Ma'mun, encouraged by perceived Byzantine weakness and suspicious of collusion between Emperor Theophilos (r. 829–842) and the Khurramite rebels of Babak Khorramdin, launched the first large-scale invasion of Byzantine territory since the start of the Abbasid civil war, and sacked several Byzantine border fortresses. Following his return from Egypt, Abu Ishaq joined al-Ma'mun in his 831 campaign against the Byzantines. After rebuffing Theophilos' offers of peace, the Abbasid army passed through the Cilician Gates and divided into three columns, with the Caliph, his son al-Abbas, and Abu Ishaq at their head. The Abbasids seized and destroyed several minor forts as well as the town of Tyana, while al-Abbas won a minor skirmish against a Byzantine army led by Theophilos in person, before withdrawing to Syria in September.

Soon after Abu Ishaq's departure from Egypt, the revolt flared up again, this time encompassing both the Arab settlers and the native Christian Copts under the leadership of Ibn Ubaydus, a descendant of one of the original Arab conquerors of the country. The rebels were confronted by the Turks, led by al-Afshin. Al-Afshin conducted a systematic campaign, winning a string of victories and engaging in large-scale executions: many male Copts were executed and their women and children sold into slavery, while the old Arab elites who had ruled the country since the Muslim conquest of Egypt in the 640s were practically annihilated. In early 832, al-Ma'mun came to Egypt, and soon after the last elements of resistance, the Copts of the coastal marshes of the Nile Delta, were subdued.

Later in the same year, al-Ma'mun repeated his invasion of the Byzantine borderlands, capturing the strategically important fortress of Loulon, a success that consolidated Abbasid control of both exits of the Cilician Gates. So encouraged was al-Ma'mun by this victory that he repeatedly rejected Theophilos' ever more generous offers for peace, and publicly announced that he intended to capture Constantinople itself. Consequently, al-Abbas was dispatched in May to convert the deserted town of Tyana into a military colony and prepare the ground for the westward advance. Al-Ma'mun followed in July, but he suddenly fell ill and died (Note: The Arabic sources report anecdotal and widely diverging stories about al-Ma'mun's final illness, including a few that claim that he was poisoned by Abu Ishaq, or that his illness was the result of an "unnecessary surgery performed by a physician acting on [Abu Ishaq's] orders".) on 7 August 833.

== Caliphate ==
Al-Ma'mun had made no official provisions for his succession. His son, al-Abbas, was old enough to rule and had acquired experience of command in the border wars with the Byzantines, but had not been named heir. According to the account of al-Tabari, on his deathbed al-Ma'mun dictated a letter nominating his brother, rather than al-Abbas, as his successor, and Abu Ishaq was acclaimed as caliph on 9 August, with the regnal name of al-Mu'tasim (in full al-Muʿtaṣim bi’llāh, "he who seeks refuge in God"). It is impossible to know whether this reflects actual events, or whether the letter was an invention and Abu Ishaq merely took advantage of his proximity to his dying brother, and al-Abbas's absence, to propel himself to the throne. As Abu Ishaq was the forefather of all subsequent Abbasid caliphs, later historians had little desire to question the legitimacy of his accession, but it is clear that his position was far from secure: a large part of the army favoured al-Abbas, and a delegation of soldiers even went to him and tried to proclaim him as the new Caliph. Only when al-Abbas refused them, whether out of weakness or out of a desire to avoid a civil war, and himself took the oath of allegiance to his uncle, did the soldiers acquiesce in al-Mu'tasim's succession. The precariousness of his position is further evidenced by the fact that al-Mu'tasim immediately called off the expedition, abandoned the Tyana project and returned with his army to Baghdad, which he reached on 20 September.

=== New elites and administration ===
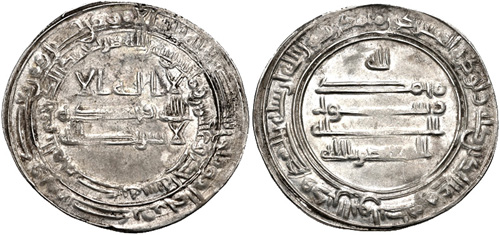
Silver dirham of al-Mu'tasim, minted at al-Muhammadiya in 836/7

Whatever the true background of his accession, al-Mu'tasim owed his rise to the throne not only to his strong personality and leadership skills, but principally to the fact that he was the only Abbasid prince to control independent military power, in the form of his Turkish corps. Unlike his brother, who tried to use the tribal Arabs and the Turks to balance out the Iranian troops, al-Mu'tasim relied almost exclusively on his Turks; the historian Tayeb El-Hibri describes al-Mu'tasim's regime as "militaristic and centred on the Turkish corps". The rise of al-Mu'tasim to the caliphate thus heralded a radical change in the nature of Abbasid administration, and the most profound shift the Islamic world had experienced since the dynasty had come to power in the Abbasid Revolution. While the latter had been backed by a mass popular movement seeking to enact social reforms, al-Mu'tasim's revolution was essentially the project of a small ruling elite aiming to secure its own power.

Already under al-Ma'mun, old-established Arab families such as the Muhallabids disappeared from the court, and minor members of the Abbasid family ceased to be appointed to governorships or senior military positions. The reforms of al-Mu'tasim completed this process, resulting in the eclipse of the previous Arab and Iranian elites, both in Baghdad and the provinces, in favour of the Turkish military, and an increasing centralization of administration around the caliphal court. A characteristic example is Egypt, where the Arab settler families still nominally formed the country's garrison (jund) and thus continued to receive a salary from the local revenues. Al-Mu'tasim discontinued the practice, removing the Arab families from the army registers (diwān) and ordering that the revenues of Egypt be sent to the central government, which would then pay a cash salary (ʿaṭāʾ) only to the Turkish troops stationed in the province. Another departure from previous practice was al-Mu'tasim's appointment of his senior lieutenants, such as Ashinas and Itakh, as nominal super-governors over several provinces. This measure was probably intended to allow his chief followers immediate access to funds with which to pay their troops, but also, according to Kennedy, "represented a further centralizing of power, for the under-governors of the provinces seldom appeared at court and played little part in the making of political decisions". Indeed, al-Mu'tasim's caliphate marks the apogee of the central government's authority, in particular as expressed in its right and power to extract taxes from the provinces, an issue that had been controversial and had faced much local opposition since the early days of the Islamic state.

The one major exception to this process were the Tahirids, who remained in place as autonomous governors of their super-province of Khurosan, encompassing most of the eastern Caliphate. The Tahirids provided the governor of Baghdad, and helped to keep the city, a focus of opposition under al-Ma'mun, quiescent. The post was held throughout al-Mu'tasim's reign by Abdallah ibn Tahir's cousin Ishaq ibn Ibrahim ibn Mus'ab, who, according to the Orientalist C. E. Bosworth, was "always one of al-Mu'tasim's closest advisers and confidants". Apart from the Turkish military and the Tahirids, al-Mu'tasim's administration depended on the central fiscal bureaucracy. As the main source of revenue was the rich lands of southern Iraq (the Sawad) and neighbouring areas, the administration was staffed mostly with men drawn from these regions. The new caliphal bureaucratic class that emerged under al-Mu'tasim was thus mostly Persian or Aramean in origin, with a large proportion of newly converted Muslims and even a few Nestorian Christians, who came from landowner or merchant families.

On his accession, al-Mu'tasim appointed as his chief minister or vizier his old personal secretary, al-Fadl ibn Marwan. A man trained in the traditions of the Abbasid bureaucracy, he was distinguished for his caution and frugality, and tried to shore up the finances of the state. These traits eventually caused his downfall, when he refused to authorize the Caliph's gifts to his courtiers on the grounds that the treasury could not afford it. He was dismissed in 836, and was lucky not to suffer any punishment more severe than being sent into exile to the village of al-Sinn. His replacement, Muhammad ibn al-Zayyat, was of a completely different character: a rich merchant, he is described by Kennedy as "a competent financial expert but a callous and brutal man who made many enemies", even among his fellow members of the administration. Nevertheless, and even though his political authority never extended beyond the fiscal domain, he managed to maintain his office to the end of the reign, and under al-Mu'tasim's successor, al-Wathiq (r. 842–847), as well.

=== Rise of the Turks ===
Al-Mu'tasim's reliance on his Turkic ghilmān grew over time, especially in the aftermath of an abortive plot against him discovered in 838, during the Amorium campaign. Headed by Ujayf ibn Anbasa, a long-serving Khurasani who had followed al-Ma'mun since the civil war against al-Amin, the conspiracy rallied the traditional Abbasid elites, dissatisfied with al-Mu'tasim's policies and especially his favouritism towards the Turks. Discontent with the latter grew due to their servile origin, which offended the Abbasid aristocracy. (Note: The sullen and rebellious mood of the abnāʾ and the Iranian elements of the Abbasid elite is conveyed by al-Tabari, who reports two of the leading conspirators, Amr al-Farghani and Ahmad ibn al-Khalil ibn Hisham, grumbling during the siege of Amorium about being humbled by Ashinas, "this slave, the son of a whore", and that they would rather defect to the Byzantines than continue to serve under him.) The plotters aimed to kill the Caliph and raise al-Ma'mun's son al-Abbas in his stead. According to al-Tabari, al-Abbas, although privy to these designs, rejected Ujayf's urgent suggestions to kill al-Mu'tasim during the initial stages of the campaign for fear of appearing to undermine the jihad. In the event, Ashinas grew suspicious of al-Farhgani and Ibn Hisham, and the plot was soon uncovered. Al-Abbas was imprisoned, and the Turkic leaders Ashinas, Itakh, and Bugha the Elder undertook to discover and arrest the other conspirators. The affair was the signal for a large-scale purge of the army that Kennedy describes as "of almost Stalinesque ruthlessness". Al-Abbas was forced to die of thirst, while his male offspring were arrested, and likely executed, by Itakh. The other leaders of the conspiracy were likewise executed in ingeniously cruel ways, which were widely publicized as a deterrent to others. According to the Kitab al-'Uyun, about seventy commanders and soldiers were executed, including some Turks.

As the historian Matthew Gordon points out, these events are probably connected to the disappearance of the abnāʾ from the historical record. Correspondingly they must have increased the standing of the Turks and their chief commanders, particularly Ashinas: in 839, his daughter, Utranja, married the son of al-Afshin, and in 840, al-Mu'tasim appointed him as his deputy during his absence from Samarra. When he returned, al-Mu'tasim publicly placed him on a throne and awarded him a ceremonial crown. In the same year, Ashinas was appointed to a super-governorate over the provinces of Egypt, Syria and the Jazira. Ashinas did not govern these directly, but appointed deputies as governors, while he remained in Samarra. When Ashinas participated in the Hajj of 841, he received honours on every stop of the route. In 840, it was the turn of al-Afshin to fall victim to the Caliph's suspicions. Despite his distinguished service as a general, he was very much the "odd man out" in the Samarran elite; the relations of the Iranian prince with the low-born Turkic generals were marked by mutual antipathy. Furthermore, he alienated the Tahirids, who might under other circumstances have been his natural allies, by interfering in Tabaristan, where he allegedly encouraged the local autonomous ruler, Mazyar, to reject Tahirid control (see below). Al-Tabari reports other allegations against al-Afshin: that he was plotting to poison al-Mu'tasim; or that he was planning to escape to his native Ushrusana with vast sums of money. According to Kennedy, the very variety of allegations against al-Afshin is grounds for skepticism about their truthfulness, and it is likely that he was framed by his enemies at court. Whatever the truth, these allegations discredited al-Afshin in the eyes of al-Mu'tasim. He was dismissed from his position in the caliphal bodyguard (al-ḥaras), and a show trial was held at the palace, where he was confronted with several witnesses, including Mazyar. Al-Afshin was accused, among other things, of being a false Muslim, and of being accorded divine status by his subjects in Ushrusana. Despite putting up an able and eloquent defence, al-Afshin was found guilty and thrown into prison. He died soon after, either of starvation or of poison. His body was publicly gibbeted in front of the palace gates, burned, and thrown in the Tigris. Once more, the affair enhanced the standing of the Turkic leadership, and particularly Wasif, who now received al-Afshin's revenues and possessions.

Nevertheless, it seems that al-Mu'tasim was not entirely satisfied with the men he had raised to power. An anecdote dating from his last years, relayed by Ishaq ibn Ibrahim ibn Mus'ab, recalls how the Caliph, in an intimate exchange with Ishaq, lamented that he had made poor choices in this regard: while his brother al-Ma'mun had nurtured four excellent servants from the Tahirids, he had raised al-Afshin, who was dead; Ashinas, "a feeble heart and a coward"; Itakh, "who is totally insignificant"; and Wasif, "an unprofitable servant". Ishaq himself then suggested that this was because, while al-Ma'mun had used men with local connections and influence, al-Mu'tasim had used men with no roots in the Muslim community, to which the Caliph sadly assented.

=== Foundation of Samarra ===
Map of Abbasid Samarra

The Turkish army was at first quartered in Baghdad, but quickly came into conflict with the remnants of the old Abbasid establishment in the city and the city's populace. The latter resented their loss of influence and career opportunities to the foreign troops, who were furthermore often undisciplined and violent, spoke no Arabic, and were either recent converts to Islam or still pagans. Violent episodes between the populace and the Turks thus became common.

This was a major factor in al-Mu'tasim's decision in 836 to found a new capital at Samarra, some 80 miles (130 km) north of Baghdad, but there were other considerations in play. Founding a new capital was a public statement of the establishment of a new regime. According to Tayeb El-Hibri it allowed the court to exist "at a distance from the populace of Baghdad and protected by a new guard of foreign troops, and amid a new royal culture revolving around sprawling palatial grounds, public spectacle and a seemingly ceaseless quest for leisurely indulgence", an arrangement compared by Oleg Grabar to the relationship between Paris and Versailles after Louis XIV. By creating a new city in a previously uninhabited area, al-Mu'tasim could reward his followers with land and commercial opportunities without cost to himself and free from any constraints, unlike Baghdad with its established interest groups and high property prices. In fact, the sale of land seems to have produced considerable profit for the treasury—in the words of Kennedy, "a sort of gigantic property speculation in which both government and its followers could expect to benefit".

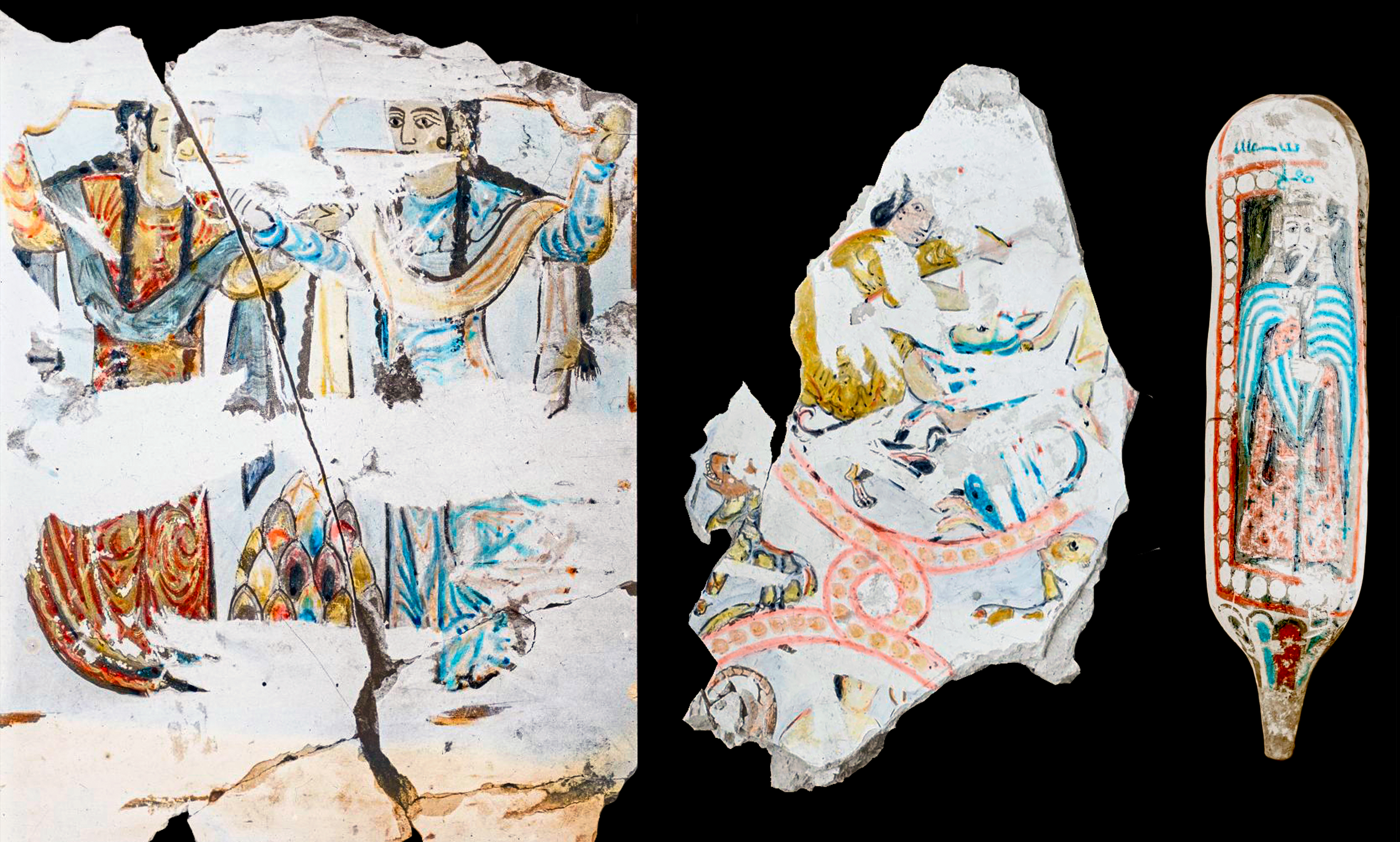
Wall frescos from the main palace of al-Ma'tasim in Samarra

Space and life in the new capital were strictly regimented: residential areas were separated from the markets, and the military was given its own cantonments, separated from the ordinary populace and each the home of a specific ethnic contingent of the army (such as the Turks or the Maghariba regiment). The city was dominated by its mosques (most famous among which is the Great Mosque of Samarra built by Caliph al-Mutawakkil in 848–852) and palaces, built in grand style by both the caliphs and their senior commanders, who were given extensive properties to develop. Unlike Baghdad, the new capital was an entirely artificial creation. Poorly sited in terms of water supply and river communications, its existence was determined solely by the presence of the caliphal court, and when the capital returned to Baghdad, sixty years later, Samarra was rapidly abandoned. Due to this, the ruins of the Abbasid capital are still extant, and the city can be mapped with great accuracy by modern archaeologists.

=== Science and learning ===
As a military man, al-Mu'tasim's outlook was utilitarian, and his intellectual pursuits could not be compared with those of al-Ma'mun or his successor al-Wathiq, but he continued his brother's policy of promoting writers and scholars. Baghdad remained a major centre of learning throughout his reign. Among the notable scholars active during his reign were the astronomers Habash al-Hasib al-Marwazi and Ahmad al-Farghani, the polymath al-Jahiz, and the distinguished Arab mathematician and philosopher al-Kindi, who dedicated his work On First Philosophy to his patron al-Mu'tasim. The Nestorian physician Salmawayh ibn Bunan, a patron of the fellow Nestorian physician and translator Hunayn ibn Ishaq, became court physician to al-Mu'tasim, while another prominent Nestorian physician, Salmawayh's rival Ibn Masawayh, received apes for dissection from the caliph. The physician Ali al-Tabari was listed as being present in al-Mu'tasim's court, along with Ibn Masawayh.

=== Mu'tazilism and the miḥna ===
Map of the events associated with the miḥna from 833 to 852

Ideologically, al-Mu'tasim followed the footsteps of al-Ma'mun, continuing his predecessor's support for Mu'tazilism, a theological doctrine that attempted to tread a middle way between secular monarchy and the theocratic approach espoused by the Alids and the various sects of Shi'ism. Mu'tazilis espoused the view that the Quran was created and hence fell within the authority of a God-guided imām to interpret according to the changing circumstances. While revering Ali, they avoided taking a position on the righteousness of the opposing sides in the conflict between Ali and his opponents. Mu'tazilism was officially adopted by al-Ma'mun in 827, and in 833, shortly before his death, al-Ma'mun made its doctrines compulsory, with the establishment of an inquisition, the miḥna. During his brother's reign, al-Mu'tasim played an active role in the enforcement of the miḥna in the western provinces; this continued after his accession. The chief advocate of Mu'tazilism, the head qādī Ahmad ibn Abi Duwad, was perhaps the dominant influence at the caliphal court throughout al-Mu'tasim's reign.

Thus Mu'tazilism became closely identified with the new regime of al-Mu'tasim. Adherence to Mu'tazilism was transformed into an intensely political issue, since to question it was to oppose the authority of the Caliph as the God-sanctioned imām. While Mu'tazilism found broad support, it was also passionately opposed by traditionalists, who held that the Quran's authority was absolute and unalterable as the literal word of God. Opposition to Mu'tazilism also provided a vehicle for criticism by those who disliked the new regime and its elites. In the event, the active repression of the traditionalists was unsuccessful, and even proved counterproductive: the beating and imprisonment of one of the most resolute opponents of Mu'tazilism, Ahmad ibn Hanbal, in 834, only helped to spread his fame. By the time al-Mutawakkil abandoned Mu'tazilism and returned to traditional orthodoxy in 848, the strict and conservative Hanbali school had emerged as the leading school of jurisprudence (fiqh) in Sunni Islam.

=== Domestic campaigns ===
Although al-Mu'tasim's reign was a time of peace in the Caliphate's heartland territories, al-Mu'tasim himself was an energetic campaigner, and according to Kennedy "acquired the reputation of being one of the warrior-caliphs of Islam". With the exception of the Amorium campaign, most of the military expeditions of al-Mu'tasim's reign were domestic, directed against rebels in areas that, although nominally part of the Caliphate, had remained outside effective Muslim rule and where native peoples and princes retained de facto autonomy. The three great campaigns of the reign—Amorium, the expedition against the Khurramite rebellion, and that against Mazyar, ruler of Tabaristan—were in part also conscious propaganda exercises, in which al-Mu'tasim could solidify his regime's legitimacy in the eyes of the populace by leading wars against infidels.

An Alid revolt led by Muhammad ibn Qasim broke out in Khurasan in early 834, but was swiftly defeated and Muhammad brought as a prisoner to the Caliph's court. He managed to escape during the night of 8/9 October 834, taking advantage of the Eid al-Fitr festivities, and was never heard of again. In June/July of the same year, Ujayf ibn 'Anbasa was sent to subdue the Zutt. These were people who had been brought from India by the Sassanid emperors and settled in the Mesopotamian Marshes. The Zutt had been in rebellion against caliphal authority since c. 820, and had frequently raided the environs of Basra and Wasit. After a seven-month campaign, Ujayf was successful in encircling the Zutt and forcing them to surrender. He made a triumphal entry into Baghdad in January 835 with numerous captives. Many of the Zutt were then sent to Ayn Zarba on the Byzantine frontier, to fight against the Byzantines.

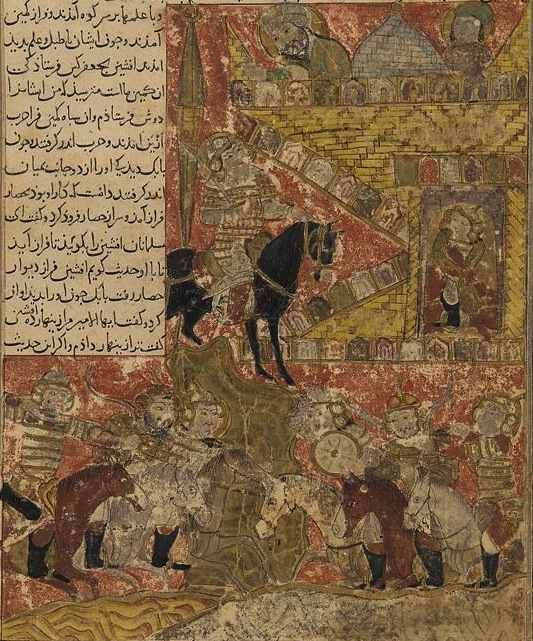
Babak parlays with al-Afshin, from Balami's Tārīkhnāma, 14th century

The first major campaign of the new reign was directed against the Khurramites in Adharbayjan and Arran. The Khurramite revolt had been active since 816/7, aided by the inaccessible mountains of the province and the absence of large Arab Muslim population centres, except for a few cities in the lowlands. Al-Ma'mun had left the local Muslims largely to their own devices. A succession of military commanders attempted to subdue the rebellion on their own initiative, and thus gain control of the country's newly discovered mineral resources, only to be defeated by the Khurramites under the capable leadership of Babak. Immediately after his accession, al-Mu'tasim sent the Tahirid ṣāḥib al-shurṭa of Baghdad and Samarra, Ishaq ibn Ibrahim ibn Mus'ab, to deal with an expansion of the Khurramite rebellion from Jibal into Hamadan. Ishaq swiftly achieved success, and by December 833 had suppressed the rebellion, forcing many Khurramites to seek refuge in the Byzantine Empire. In 835 al-Mu'tasim took action against Babak, assigning his trusted and capable lieutenant, al-Afshin, to command the campaign. After three years of cautious and methodical campaigning, al-Afshin was able to capture Babak at his capital of Budhdh on 26 August 837, extinguishing the rebellion. Babak was brought captive to Samarra, where, on 3 January 838, he was paraded before the people seated on an elephant, and then publicly executed.

Shortly after, Minkajur al-Ushrusani, whom al-Afshin had appointed as governor of Adharbayjan after the defeat of the Khurramites, rose in revolt, either because he had been involved in financial irregularities, or because he had been a co-conspirator of al-Afshin's. Bugha the Elder marched against him, forcing him to capitulate and receive a safe-passage to Samarra in 840.

The second major domestic campaign of the reign began in 838, against Mazyar, the autonomous Qarinid ruler of Tabaristan. Tabaristan had been subjected to Abbasid authority in 760, but Muslim presence was limited to the coastal lowlands of the Caspian Sea and their cities. The mountainous areas remained under native rulers—chief among whom were the Bavandids in the eastern and the Qarinids in the central and western mountain ranges—who retained their autonomy in exchange for paying a tribute to the Caliphate. With the support of al-Ma'mun, Mazyar had established himself as the de facto ruler of all Tabaristan, even capturing the Muslim city of Amul and imprisoning the local Abbasid governor. Al-Mu'tasim confirmed him in his post on his accession, but trouble soon began when Mazyar refused to accept his subordination to the Tahirid viceroy of the east, Abdallah ibn Tahir, instead insisting on paying the taxes of his region directly to al-Mu'tasim's agent. According to al-Tabari, the Qarinid's intransigence had been secretly encouraged by al-Afshin, who hoped to discredit the Tahirids and assume their vast governorship in the east himself.

Tension mounted as the Tahirids encouraged the local Muslims to resist Mazyar, forcing the latter to adopt an increasingly confrontational stance against the Muslim settlers and turn for support on the native Iranian, and mostly Zoroastrian, peasantry, whom he encouraged to attack the Muslim landowners. Open conflict erupted in 838, when his troops seized the cities of Amul and Sari, took the Muslim settlers prisoner, and executed many of them. In return, the Tahirids under al-Hasan ibn al-Husayn ibn Mus'ab and Muhammad ibn Ibrahim ibn Mus'ab invaded Tabaristan. Mazyar was betrayed by his brother Quhyar, who also revealed to the Tahirids the correspondence between Mazyar and al-Afshin. Quhyar then succeeded his brother as a Tahirid appointee, while Mazyar was taken captive to Samarra. Like Babak, he was paraded before the populace, and then flogged to death, on 6 September 840. While the autonomy of the local dynasties was maintained in the aftermath of the revolt, the event marked the onset of the country's rapid Islamization, including among the native dynasties.

Near the end of al-Mu'tasim's life there were a series of uprisings in the Syrian provinces, including the revolt by Abu Harb, known as al-Mubarqa or "the Veiled One", which brought to the fore the lingering pro-Umayyad sentiment of several Syrian Arabs.

=== Confrontation with Byzantium ===
Map of the Byzantine and Abbasid campaigns in the years 837–838, showing Theophilos's raid into Upper Mesopotamia and al-Mu'tasim's retaliatory invasion of Asia Minor, culminating in the conquest of Amorium.

Taking advantage of the Abbasids' preoccupation with the suppression of the Khurramite rebellion, the Byzantine emperor Theophilos had launched attacks on the Muslim frontier zone in the early 830s, and scored several successes. His forces were bolstered by some 14,000 Khurramites who fled into the Empire, became baptized and enrolled in the Byzantine army under the command of their leader Nasr, better known by his Christian name Theophobos. In 837, Theophilos, urged by the increasingly hard-pressed Babak, launched a major campaign into the Muslim frontier lands. He led a large army, reportedly numbering over 70,000 men, in an almost unopposed invasion of the region around the upper Euphrates. The Byzantines took the towns of Zibatra (Sozopetra) and Arsamosata, ravaged and plundered the countryside, extracted ransom from Malatya and other cities in exchange for not attacking them, and defeated several smaller Arab forces. As refugees began arriving at Samarra, the caliphal court was outraged by the brutality and brazenness of the raids; not only had the Byzantines acted in open collusion with the Khurramites, but during the sack of Zibatra all male prisoners were executed and the rest of the population sold into slavery, and some captive women were raped by Theophilos' Khurramites.

The Caliph took personal charge of preparations for a retaliatory expedition, as the campaigns against Byzantium were customarily the only ones in which caliphs participated in person. Al-Mu'tasim assembled a huge force—80,000 men with 30,000 servants and camp followers according to Michael the Syrian, or even larger according to other writers—at Tarsus. He declared his target to be Amorium, the birthplace of the reigning Byzantine dynasty. The Caliph reportedly had the name painted on the shields and banners of his army. The campaign began in June, with a smaller force under al-Afshin attacking through the Pass of Hadath in the east, while the Caliph with the main army crossed the Cilician Gates from 19 to 21 June. Theophilos, who had been caught unaware by the two-pronged Abbasid attack, tried to confront al-Afshin's smaller force first, but suffered a major defeat at the Battle of Dazimon on 22 July, barely escaping with his life. Unable to offer any effective resistance to the Abbasid advance, the Emperor returned to Constantinople. A week later, al-Afshin and the main caliphal army joined forces before Ancyra, which had been left defenceless and was plundered.

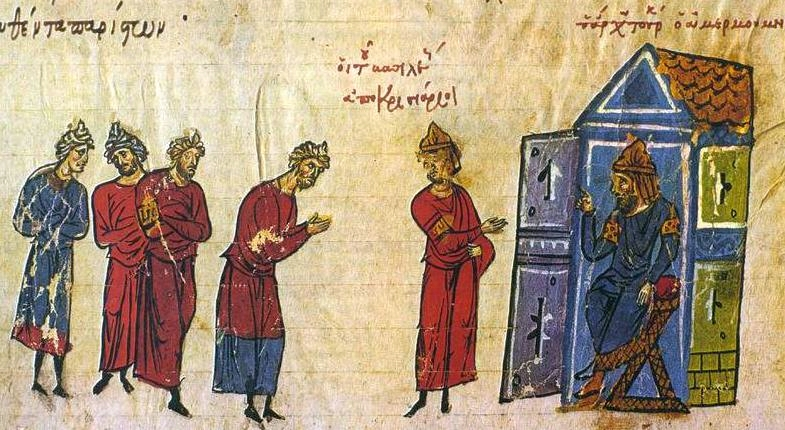
Byzantine envoys before al-Mu'tasim (seated, right), miniature from the Madrid Skylitzes (12th/13th century)

From Ancyra, the Abbasid army turned to Amorium, to which they laid siege on 1 August. Al-Afshin, Itakh, and Ashinas all took turns assaulting the city with their troops, but the siege was fiercely contested, even after the Abbasids, informed by a defector, effected a breach in a weak spot of the wall. After two weeks, taking advantage of a short truce for negotiations requested by one of the Byzantine commanders of the breach, the Abbasid army successfully stormed the city. It was thoroughly plundered and its walls razed, while the populace, numbering into the tens of thousands, was carried off to be sold into slavery. According to al-Tabari, al-Mu'tasim was now considering extending his campaign to attack Constantinople, when the conspiracy headed by his nephew, al-Abbas, was uncovered. Al-Mu'tasim was forced to cut short his campaign and return quickly to his realm, without bothering with Theophilos and his forces, stationed in nearby Dorylaion. Taking the direct route from Amorium to the Cilician Gates, both the Caliph's army and its prisoners suffered during the march through the arid countryside of central Anatolia. Some captives were so exhausted that they could not move and were executed, while others found in the turmoil the opportunity to escape. In retaliation, al-Mu'tasim, after separating the most prominent among them, executed the rest, some 6,000.

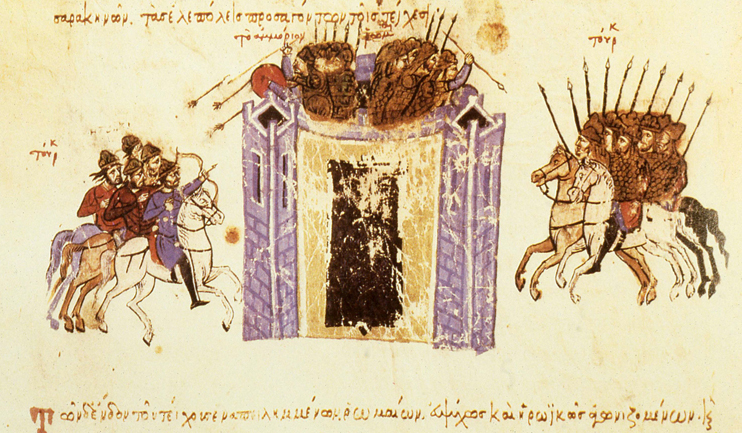
Miniature depicting the sack of Amorium in 838

The sack of Amorium brought al-Mu'tasim much acclaim as a warrior-caliph and ghāzī (warrior for the faith), and was celebrated by contemporaries, most notably in a famous ode by the court poet Abu Tammam. The Abbasids did not follow up on their success. Warfare continued between the two empires with raids and counter-raids along the border, but after a few Byzantine successes a truce was agreed in 841. At the time of his death in 842, al-Mu'tasim was preparing yet another large-scale invasion, but the great fleet he had prepared to assault Constantinople was destroyed in a storm off Cape Chelidonia a few months later. Following al-Mu'tasim's death, warfare gradually died down, and the Battle of Mauropotamos in 844 was the last major Arab–Byzantine engagement for a decade.

== Death and legacy ==
Al-Tabari states that al-Mu'tasim fell ill on 21 October 841. His regular physician, Salmawayh ibn Bunan, whom the Caliph had trusted implicitly, had died the previous year. His new physician, Yahya ibn Masawayh, did not follow the normal treatment of cupping and purging. According to Hunayn ibn Ishaq this worsened the caliph's illness and brought about his death on 5 January 842, after a reign of eight years, eight months and two days according to the Islamic calendar. He was buried in the Jawsaq al-Khaqani palace in Samarra. The succession of his son, al-Wathiq, was unopposed. Al-Wathiq's reign, through unremarkable, was essentially a continuation of al-Mu'tasim's own, as the government continued to be led by the men al-Mu'tasim had raised to power: the Turks Itakh, Wasif, and Ashinas; the vizier Ibn al-Zayyat; and the chief qādī Ahmad ibn Abi Duwad.

Al-Tabari describes al-Mu'tasim as having a relatively easygoing nature, being kind, agreeable and charitable. According to C. E. Bosworth the sources reveal little about al-Mu'tasim's character, other than his lack of sophistication compared with his half-brother. Nevertheless, Bosworth concludes, he was a proficient military commander who secured the caliphate both politically and militarily.

Al-Mu'tasim's reign represents a watershed moment in the history of the Abbasid state, and had long-lasting repercussions in Islamic history. Al-Mu'tasim's military reforms marked "the moment when the Arabs lost control of the empire they created", according to Kennedy, while according to David Ayalon, the institution of military slavery introduced by al-Mu'tasim became "one of the most important and most enduring socio-political institutions that Islam has known". With his Turkish guard, al-Mu'tasim set a pattern that would be widely imitated: not only did the military acquire a predominant position in the state, but it also increasingly became the preserve of minority groups from the peoples living on the margins of the Islamic world. Thus it formed an exclusive ruling caste, separated from the Arab-Iranian mainstream of society by ethnic origin, language, and sometimes even religion. This dichotomy would become, according to Hugh Kennedy, a "distinctive feature" of many Islamic polities, and would reach its apogee in the Mamluk dynasties that ruled Egypt and Syria in the late Middle Ages.

More immediately, although al-Mu'tasim's new professional army proved militarily highly effective, it also posed a potential danger to the stability of the Abbasid regime, as the army's separation from mainstream society meant that the soldiers were entirely reliant on the ʿaṭāʾ for survival. Consequently, any failure to provide their pay, or policies that threatened their position, were likely to cause a violent reaction. This became evident less than a generation later, during the "Anarchy at Samarra" (861–870), where the Turks played the main role. The need to cover military spending would henceforth be a fixture of caliphal government. This was at a time when government income began to decline rapidly—partly through the rise of autonomous dynasties in the provinces and partly through the decline in productivity of the lowlands of Iraq that had traditionally provided the bulk of tax revenue. Less than a century after al-Mu'tasim's death, this process would lead to the bankruptcy of the Abbasid government and the eclipse of the caliphs' political power with the rise of the Khazar officer Ibn Ra'iq to the position of amīr al-umarāʾ.

== Family ==
Family tree of the descendants of al-Mu'tasim. Al-Mu'tasim was the forefather of all subsequent Abbasid caliphs.

One of al-Mu'tasim's wives was Badhal. She had been formerly a concubine of his cousin Ja'far ibn al-Hadi, his brothers al-Amin and al-Ma'mun, and Ali ibn Hisham. She hailed from Medina and was raised in Basra. Described as charming with fair skin, she was praised for her musical talent, particularly her skill in playing instruments, and was known for her exceptional ability as a songwriter and singer. One of his concubines was Qaratis, a Greek, and the mother of his eldest son, the future caliph al-Wathiq. She died on 16 August 842 in Kufa, and was buried in the palace of Abbasid prince, Dawud ibn Isa. Another concubine was Shuja. She was from Khwarazm, and was related to Musa ibn Bugha the Elder. She was the mother of the future caliph al-Mutawakkil, and died on 19 June 861 in al-Ja'fariyyah. Her grandson, caliph al-Muntasir, offered the funeral prayer and she was buried in the Friday Mosque.

Children

- Abu Ja'far Harun, reigned as Caliph al-Wathiq. He was the eldest son of al-Mu'tasim.
- Abu al-Fadl Ja'far, reigned as Caliph al-Mutawakkil.
- Muhammad, father of Caliph al-Musta'in.
- Ahmad.
- Al-Abbas.
- Aisha, a poet.

== al-Mu'tasim in literature ==
Al-Mu'tasim is featured in the medieval Arabic and Turkish epic Delhemma, which features heavily fictionalized versions of events from the Arab–Byzantine wars. In it, al-Mu'tasim helps the heroes pursue the traitor and apostate Uqba across several countries "from Spain to Yemen", before having him crucified before Constantinople. On its return, the Muslim army is ambushed in a defile by the Byzantines, and only 400 men, including the Caliph and most of the heroes, manage to escape. In retaliation, al-Mu'tasim's successor al-Wathiq launches a campaign against Constantinople, where he installs a Muslim governor.

The name al-Mu'tasim is used for a fictional character in the story The Approach to al-Mu'tasim, written in 1936 by Argentine author Jorge Luis Borges, which appears in his anthology Ficciones. The al-Mu'tasim referenced there is not the Abbasid caliph, though Borges does state, regarding the original, non-fictional al-Mu'tasim from whom the name is taken: "the name of that eighth Abbasid caliph who was victorious in eight battles, fathered eight sons and eight daughters, left eight thousand slaves, and ruled for a period of eight years, eight moons, and eight days".

While not strictly accurate, Borges' quote paraphrases al-Tabari, who notes that he was "born in the eighth month, was the eighth caliph, in the eighth generation from al-Abbas, his lifespan was eight and forty years, that he died leaving eight sons (Note: Only six sons are listed by Ya'qubi: Harun al-Wathiq, Ja'far al-Mutawakkil, Muhammad, Ahmad, Ali, and Abdallah.) and eight daughters, and that he reigned for eight years and eight months", and reflects the widespread reference to al-Mu'tasim in Arabic sources as al-Muthamman ("the man of eight").

== Bibliography ==
- Ayalon, David (1994). "The Military Reforms of Caliph al-Mu'tasim: Their Background and Consequences". Islam and the Abode of War: Military Slaves and Islamic Adversaries. Variorum Collected Studies Series. Brookfield, VT: Ashgate Publishing. pp. 1–39. ISBN 978-0-86078-430-2.
- Bosworth, C. E., ed. (1987). The History of al-Ṭabarī, Volume XXXII: The Reunification of the ʿAbbāsid Caliphate: The Caliphate of al-Maʾmūn, A.D. 813–33/A.H. 198–213. SUNY Series in Near Eastern Studies. Albany, New York: State University of New York Press. ISBN 978-0-88706-058-8.
- Bosworth, C. E., ed. (1991). The History of al-Ṭabarī, Volume XXXIII: Storm and Stress Along the Northern Frontiers of the ʿAbbāsid Caliphate: The Caliphate of al-Muʿtasim, A.D. 833–842/A.H. 218–227. SUNY Series in Near Eastern Studies. Albany, New York: State University of New York Press. ISBN 978-0-7914-0493-5.
- Bosworth, C. E. (1993). "al-Muʿtaṣim Bi'llāh". In Bosworth, C. E.; van Donzel, E.; Heinrichs, W. P. & Pellat, Ch. (eds.). The Encyclopaedia of Islam, Second Edition. Volume VII: Mif–Naz. Leiden: E. J. Brill. p. 776. ISBN 978-90-04-09419-2.
- Brett, Michael (2010). "Egypt". In Robinson, Chase F. (ed.). The New Cambridge History of Islam, Volume 1: The Formation of the Islamic World, Sixth to Eleventh Centuries. Cambridge: Cambridge University Press. pp. 506–540. ISBN 978-0-521-83823-8.
- Canard, Marius (1965). "D̲h̲u 'l-Himma". In Lewis, B.; Pellat, Ch. & Schacht, J. (eds.). The Encyclopaedia of Islam, Second Edition. Volume II: C–G. Leiden: E. J. Brill. pp. 233–239. OCLC 495469475.
- Cooperson, Michael (2005). Al Ma'mun. Makers of the Muslim world. Oxford: Oneworld. ISBN 978-1851683864.
- El-Hibri, Tayeb (2010). "The empire in Iraq, 763–861". In Robinson, Chase F. (ed.). The New Cambridge History of Islam, Volume 1: The Formation of the Islamic World, Sixth to Eleventh Centuries. Cambridge: Cambridge University Press. pp. 269–304. ISBN 978-0-521-83823-8.
- Freely, John (2015). Light from the East: How the Science of Medieval Islam Helped to Shape the Western World. London and New York: I.B. Tauris. ISBN 978-1-78453-138-6.
- Frye, R. N. (1975). "The Sāmānids". In Frye, Richard N. (ed.). The Cambridge History of Iran: From the Arab Invasion to the Saljuqs. Vol. 4. Cambridge: Cambridge University Press. pp. 136–161. ISBN 0-521-20093-8.
- Gordon, Matthew S. (2001). The Breaking of a Thousand Swords: A History of the Turkish Military of Samarra (A.H. 200–275/815–889 C.E.). Albany, New York: State University of New York Press. ISBN 0-7914-4795-2.
- Ibn al-Sāʿī (2017). Consorts of the Caliphs: Women and the Court of Baghdad. Translated by Shawkat M. Toorawa and the Editors of the Library of Arabic Literature. Introduction by Julia Bray, Foreword by Marina Warner. New York: New York University Press. ISBN 978-1-4798-0477-1.
- Kennedy, Hugh (1990). "The ʿAbbasid Caliphate: A Historical Introduction". In Ashtiany, Julia; Johnstone, T. M.; Latham, J. D.; Serjeant, R. B.; Smith, G. Rex (eds.). ʿAbbasid Belles Lettres. The Cambridge History of Arabic Literature. Cambridge: Cambridge University Press. pp. 1–15. ISBN 978-0-521-24016-1.
- Kennedy, Hugh (1998). "Egypt as a province in the Islamic caliphate, 641–868". In Petry, Carl F. (ed.). The Cambridge History of Egypt: Islamic Egypt, 640–1517. Vol. 1. Cambridge: Cambridge University Press. pp. 62–85. ISBN 0-521-47137-0.
- Kennedy, Hugh (2001). The Armies of the Caliphs: Military and Society in the Early Islamic State. London and New York: Routledge. ISBN 0-415-25093-5.
- Kennedy, Hugh (2004) [1986]. The Prophet and the Age of the Caliphates: The Islamic Near East from the 6th to the 11th Century (Second ed.). Harlow: Longman. ISBN 978-0-582-40525-7.
- Kennedy, Hugh (2004b). "The Decline and Fall of the First Muslim Empire". Der Islam. 81: 3–30. doi:10.1515/islm.2004.81.1.3. ISSN 0021-1818. S2CID 163373996.
- Kennedy, Hugh (2006). When Baghdad Ruled the Muslim World: The Rise and Fall of Islam's Greatest Dynasty. Cambridge, Massachusetts: Da Capo Press. ISBN 978-0-306814808.
- Kraemer, Joel L., ed. (1989). The History of al-Ṭabarī, Volume XXXIV: Incipient Decline: The Caliphates of al-Wāthiq, al-Mutawakkil and al-Muntaṣir, A.D. 841–863/A.H. 227–248. SUNY Series in Near Eastern Studies. Albany, New York: State University of New York Press. ISBN 978-0-88706-874-4.
- Madelung, W. (1975). "The Minor Dynasties of Northern Iran". In Frye, Richard N. (ed.). The Cambridge History of Iran: From the Arab Invasion to the Saljuqs. Vol. 4. Cambridge: Cambridge University Press. pp. 198–249. ISBN 0-521-20093-8.
- Marzolph, Ulrich (2007). "Arabian Nights". In Fleet, Kate; Krämer, Gudrun; Matringe, Denis; Nawas, John; Rowson, Everett (eds.). Encyclopaedia of Islam (3rd ed.). Brill Online. ISSN 1873-9830.
- Masudi (2010) [1989]. The Meadows of Gold: The Abbasids. Translated by Paul Lunde and Caroline Stone. London and New York: Routledge. ISBN 978-0-7103-0246-5.
- Mottahedeh, Roy (1975). "The ʿAbbāsid Caliphate in Iran". In Frye, Richard N. (ed.). The Cambridge History of Iran: From the Arab Invasion to the Saljuqs. Vol. 4. Cambridge: Cambridge University Press. pp. 57–90. ISBN 0-521-20093-8.
- Saliba, George, ed. (1985). The History of al-Ṭabarī, Volume XXXV: The Crisis of the ʿAbbāsid Caliphate: The Caliphates of al-Mustaʿīn and al-Muʿtazz, A.D. 862–869/A.H. 248–255. SUNY Series in Near Eastern Studies. Albany, New York: State University of New York Press. ISBN 978-0-87395-883-7.
- Sarton, George (1927). Introduction to the History of Science, Volume I. From Homer to Omar Khayyam. Baltimore: Carnegie Institution of Washington. OCLC 874972552.
- Stillman, Yedida Kalfon (2003). Norman A. Stillman (ed.). Arab Dress, A Short History: From the Dawn of Islam to Modern Times (Revised Second ed.). Leiden and Boston: Brill. ISBN 978-90-04-11373-2.
- Treadgold, Warren (1988). The Byzantine Revival, 780–842. Stanford, California: Stanford University Press. ISBN 978-0-8047-1462-4.
- Vasiliev, Alexander A. (1935). Byzance et les Arabes, Tome I: La dynastie d'Amorium (820–867). Corpus Bruxellense Historiae Byzantinae (in French). Vol. 1. French ed.: Henri Grégoire, Marius Canard. Brussels: Éditions de l'Institut de philologie et d'histoire orientales.
- Zetterstéen, K. V. (1987). "al-Muʿtaṣim bi 'llāh, Abū Isḥāḳ Muḥammad". In Houtsma, Martijn Theodoor (ed.). E.J. Brill's First Encyclopaedia of Islam, 1913–1936, Volume VI: Morocco–Ruzzik. Leiden: Brill. p. 785. ISBN 978-90-04-08265-6.

al-Mu'tasim Abbasid dynasty Born: 796 Died: 5 January 842
Sunni Islam titles
Preceded by al-Ma'mun	Caliph of the Abbasid Caliphate; 9 August 833 – 5 January 842	Succeeded by al-Wathiq
