= Abbasid Caliphate =

Third Islamic caliphate

Abbasid Caliphate الْخِلَافَة الْعَبَّاسِيَّة (Arabic) Al-Khilāfa al-ʿAbbāsiyya
- 750–1258; 1261–1517 (Note: The Abbasids resided in Cairo as ceremonial figures under the Mamluk sultans after the fall of Baghdad in 1258. See article for details.)
- The Abbasid Black Standard (Note: The Abbasid Revolution against the Umayyad Caliphate adopted black for its rāyaʾ for which their partisans were called the musawwids. Their rivals chose other colours in reaction; among these, forces loyal to Marwan II adopted red. The choice of black as the colour of the Abbasid Revolution was already motivated by the "black standards out of Khorasan" tradition associated with the Mahdi. The contrast of white vs. black as the Umayyad vs. Abbasid dynastic colour over time developed in white as the colour of Shia Islam and black as the colour of Sunni Islam: "The proselytes of the ʿAbbasid revolution took full advantage of the eschatological expectations raised by black banners in their campaign to undermine the Umayyad dynasty from within. Even after the ʿAbbasids had triumphed over the Umayyads in 750, they continued to deploy black as their dynastic colour; not only the banners but the headdresses and garments of the ʿAbbasid caliphs were black... The ubiquitous black created a striking contrast with the banners and dynastic color of the Umayyads, which had been white ... The Ismaili Shiʿite counter-caliphate founded by the Fatimids took white as its dynastic color, creating a visual contrast to the ʿAbbasid enemy ... white became the Shiʿite color, in deliberate opposition to the black of the ʿAbbasid 'establishment'." After the revolution, Islamic apocalyptic circles admitted that the Abbasid banners would be black but asserted that the Mahdi's standard would be black and larger. Anti-Abbasid circles cursed "the black banners from the East", "first and last".)

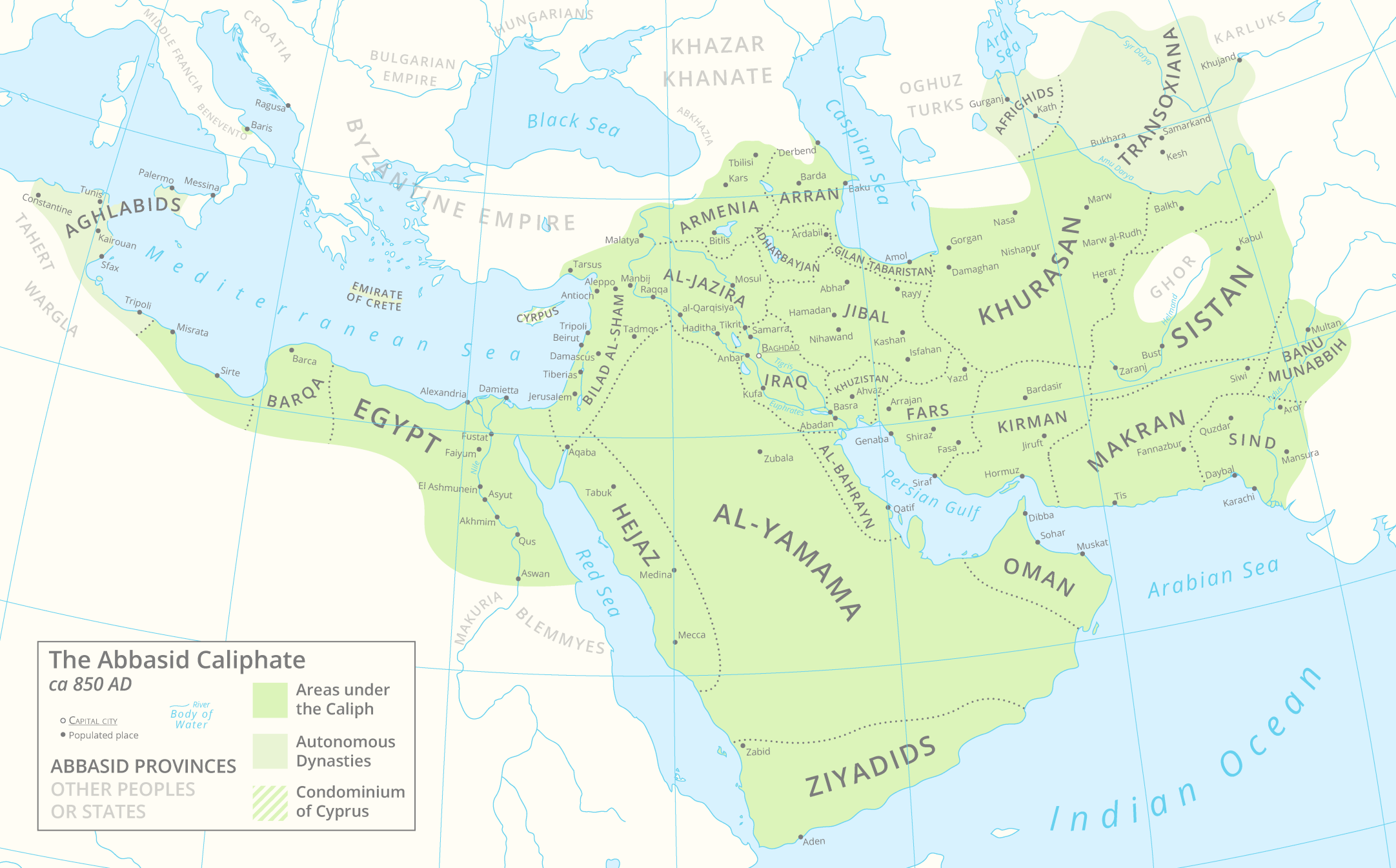
- The Abbasid Caliphate in 850 AD
- Status: Caliphate
- Capital: Kufa (750–762) (Note: Kufa remained the overall administrative capital but the caliphs resided in multiple other sites during these years. See article for details.); Baghdad (762–836, 892–1258); Samarra (836–892); Cairo (1261–1517)
- Official languages: Arabic
- Religion: Islam (state); Christianity (minority); Judaism (minority); Zoroastrianism (minority)
- Demonym: Abbasid
- Government: Hereditary monarchy
- Caliph
  - 750–754: Al-Saffah (first)
  - 1242–1258: Al-Musta'sim (last caliph in Baghdad)
  - 1261–1262: Al-Mustansir II (first caliph in Cairo)
  - 1508–1517: Al-Mutawakkil III (last caliph in Cairo)
- Vizier
  - 779–782: Ya'qub ibn Dawud
  - 1258: Muhammad ibn al-Alqami
- History
  - Abbasid Revolution: 750
  - Founding of Baghdad: 762
  - Al-Ma'mun wins civil war: 813
  - Founding of Samarra: 836
  - Anarchy at Samarra: 861–870
  - Buyids take control of Baghdad: 945
  - The Seljuks conquer Baghdad: 1055
  - Abbasids declare independence from Seljuks: 1165
  - Mongol siege of Baghdad: 1258
  - Abbasids re-established as ceremonial caliphs in Cairo: 1261
  - Ottoman conquest of Cairo: 1517
- Currency: Dinar (gold coin); Dirham (silver coin); Fals (copper coin)
Preceded by
Umayyad Caliphate
Dabuyid dynasty
Succeeded by
Samanid dynasty
Saffarid dynasty
Sajid dynasty
Fatimid Caliphate
Ziyarid dynasty
Buyid dynasty
Mongol Empire
Habbari dynasty
Emirate of Multan

The Abbasid Caliphate or Abbasid Empire (Note: Pronunciation: /ə.ˈbæs.ɪd, ˈæb.ə.sɪd/, ə-BASS-id or AB-ə-sid. In Arabic: الْخِلَافَة الْعَبَّاسِيَّة, romanized: al-Khilāfa al-ʿAbbāsiyya.) was the third Islamic caliphate, ruled by the Abbasid dynasty. The dynasty was descended from Muhammad's uncle, Abbas ibn Abd al-Muttalib (d. 653), after whom it is named. The Abbasids rose to power in 750, when the Abbasid revolution overthrew the preceding Umayyad Caliphate. They ruled as caliphs from their base in Iraq until 1258, with Baghdad as their capital for most of their history.

The Abbasid Revolution had its origins and first successes in the easterly region of Khurasan, far from the Syrian center of Umayyad influence. The Abbasids first centered their government in Kufa, Iraq, but in 762 the second caliph al-Mansur founded the city of Baghdad and made it the capital. Baghdad became a center of science, culture, arts, and invention, ushering in what became known as the Golden Age of Islam. It hosted several key academic institutions, such as the House of Wisdom, as well as a multi-ethnic and multi-religious population, which made the city famous as a centre of learning across the world. The Abbasid period was marked by the use of bureaucrats in government, including the vizier, as well as a growing inclusion of non-Arab Muslims in the ummah (Muslim community) and among the political elites.

The height of Abbasid power and prestige is traditionally associated with the reign of Harun al-Rashid (r. 786–809). After his death, a civil war brought new divisions and was followed by significant changes to the character of the state, including the creation of a new professional army recruited mainly from Turkic slaves and the construction of a new capital, Samarra, in 836. The 9th century also saw many provinces becoming increasingly autonomous, giving rise to local dynasties that controlled different regions of the empire, such as the Aghlabids, Tahirids, Samanids, Saffarids, and Tulunids. After a period of turmoil in the 860s, the caliphate regained some stability and its seat returned to Baghdad in 892.

During the 10th century, the caliphs were reduced to mere figureheads, with real political and military power resting in the hands of the Iranian Buyids and the Seljuq Turks, who took control of Baghdad in 945 and 1055, respectively. The Abbasids eventually regained control of Iraq during the reign of Caliph al-Muqtafi (r. 1136–1160) and extended their rule into Iran during the reign of Caliph al-Nasir (r. 1180–1225). This revival ended in 1258 with the sack of Baghdad by the Mongols under Hulagu Khan and the execution of Caliph al-Musta'sim, marking the effective end of the Abbasid Caliphate. A surviving branch of the Abbasid dynasty was formally reinstated in 1261 by the Mamluk sultans in Cairo, but it lacked any political power. The dynasty continued to claim symbolic authority until the Ottoman conquest of Egypt in 1517, the last Abbasid caliph being al-Mutawakkil III.

== History ==
=== Abbasid Revolution (747–750) ===
The Abbasid caliphs descended from Abbas ibn Abd al-Muttalib, one of the youngest uncles of Muhammad and of the same Banu Hashim clan. This family relation to Muhammad made them appealing to those who were discontented with the rule of the Umayyad caliphs (661–750), who did not descend from the same family. Over the course of their rule, the Umayyads suppressed several rebellions that attempted to bring other members of Muhammad's family to power.

One of the claims that the Abbasids made in the early years of their political movement was that Abu Hashim, the son of Muhammad ibn al-Hanafiyya and grandson of Ali, had formally transferred the Imamate (imāmah) to Muhammad ibn Ali (the great-grandson of Abbas) and thus to the Abbasid family. Muhammad ibn Ali began to campaign in Persia for the return of power to the family of Muhammad, the Hashemites, starting in 718 during the reign of Umar ibn Abd al-Aziz. Later, after they had attained power and needed to broaden their support among Muslims, the Abbasids supplemented this claim with other claims to justify their legitimacy.

The Abbasids also distinguished themselves from the Umayyads by attacking their moral character and administration in general. The Abbasids also appealed to non-Arab Muslims, known as mawali, who remained outside the kinship-based society of the Arabs and were perceived as a lower class within the Umayyad empire.

The eventual launching point of the revolution was Khurasan (roughly northeastern Iran), a strategic province that was distant from the caliphate's centres of power and had enjoyed a degree of autonomy and local identity since the pre-Islamic Sasanian period. Despite being on the frontier of the Islamic world, it encompassed a relatively large Muslim population made up of both Arab settlers and local converts who were relatively well-integrated with each other. The population resented Umayyad rule, which was seen as foreign and oppressive, and local tensions had simmered for years. According to Ira Lapidus, "The Abbasid revolt was supported largely by Arabs, mainly the aggrieved settlers of Merv with the addition of the Yemeni faction and their Mawali".

Support for the Abbasids spread through Khurasan during the 740s. In 744 or 745, some of its local leaders, including Qahtaba ibn Shabib, traveled to Mecca for the hajj pilgrimage and met there with the head of the Abbasid family, Ibrahim al-Imam (fourth in descent from Abbas). They pledged allegiance to Ibrahim and returned to Khurasan accompanied by one of Ibrahim's freedmen, a Persian known as Abu Muslim.

During the reign of the Umayyad caliph Marwan II, this opposition culminated in a rebellion that began on 9 June 747 (15 Ramadan 129 AH). Abu Muslim, rising from Khurasan, initiated an open revolt against Umayyad rule. Close to 10,000 soldiers were under Abu Muslim's command when the hostilities officially began in Merv. The rebellion's main initial support came from Khurasan, despite the opposition of the local Umayyad governor there, Nasr ibn Sayyar, as well as from Shi'i Arabs. Qahtaba, now one of Abu Muslim's generals, defeated Nasr ibn Sayyar and pursued him west, where he defeated the Umayyads at the Battle of Gorgan, the Battle of Nahavand and finally in the Battle of Karbala, all in the year 748.

Ibrahim had remained in Humayma (in present-day Jordan) and his identity was not revealed to most of the movement's supporters, who knew only that they supported someone from the family of Muhammad to replace the Umayyads. When Marwan learned of the Abbasid involvement in the uprising, he had Ibrahim arrested and thrown into prison, where he died or was executed in 749. The rebels pressed on to capture the important city of Kufa in Iraq that same year, although Qahtaba died on the way. To pre-empt any attempt by the Alids (those descended from Muhammad's cousin and son-in-law, Ali) to put forth their own candidate for the caliphate, Abu Muslim and the Abbasids rushed to declare Ibrahim's brother, Abu al-'Abbas al-Saffah, as the new caliph in Kufa.

After this declaration, the Abbasids sent armies west for a final confrontation with Marwan, while also recruiting new allies from this region to supplement their Khurasani supporters. They met the Umayyad army in a battle near the Great Zab river in early 750, where Marwan was defeated, marking the end of Umayyad power. After this loss, Marwan fled to Egypt, where he was subsequently killed. The remainder of his family were also eliminated, barring one male who escaped (the future Abd al-Rahman I).

=== Establishment and consolidation (750–775) ===
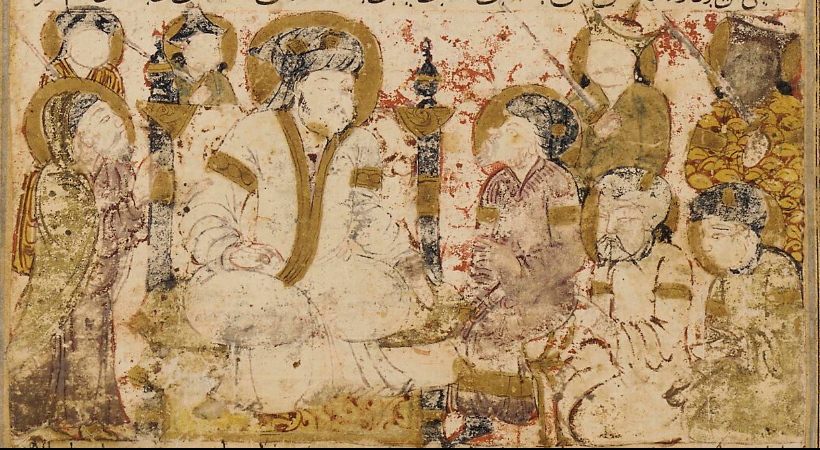
Early 14th century copy of the Samanid-period Tarikhnama of Bal'ami (10th century) depicting al-Saffah (r. 750–754) as he receives pledges of allegiance in Kufa

Al-Saffah's reign (r. 750–754) was spent consolidating Abbasid rule over the Muslim community. In addition to the caliph himself, most of the real power at this time was in the hands of a triumvirate including the revolutionary leader Abu Muslim, al-Saffah's older brother Abu Ja'far (the future caliph al-Mansur) and al-Saffah's uncle Abdallah ibn Ali (the commander at the battle at the Great Zab).

Soon after the victory of 750, Abu Muslim sent forces to Central Asia to confront an army from Tang China led by Gao Xianzhi. Gao Xianzhi and his army were defeated in 751 at the Battle of Talas, near present-day Tashkent, by the Abbasid army under Ziyad ibn Salih. This defeat marked the end of Tang influence in Transoxiana and halted Tang westward expansion. The Abbasids then consolidated their rule in Transoxania. Elsewhere, the Abbasids focused on putting down numerous rebellions in Syria and Iraq. The Byzantines conducted raids during these early distractions.

One of the first major changes effected by Abbasid rule was the move of the caliphate's center of power from Syria to Iraq. This was closer to the Persian mawali support base of the Abbasids and the move addressed their demand for reduced Arab dominance in the empire. However, no definitive capital was yet selected. In these early Abbasid years, Kufa generally served as the administrative capital, but the caliphs were wary of the Alid sympathies in the city and did not always reside here. In 752, al-Saffah built a new city called al-Hashimiyya, at an uncertain location, most likely near Kufa. Later that same year, he moved to Anbar, where he built a new settlement for his Khurasani soldiers and a palace for himself.

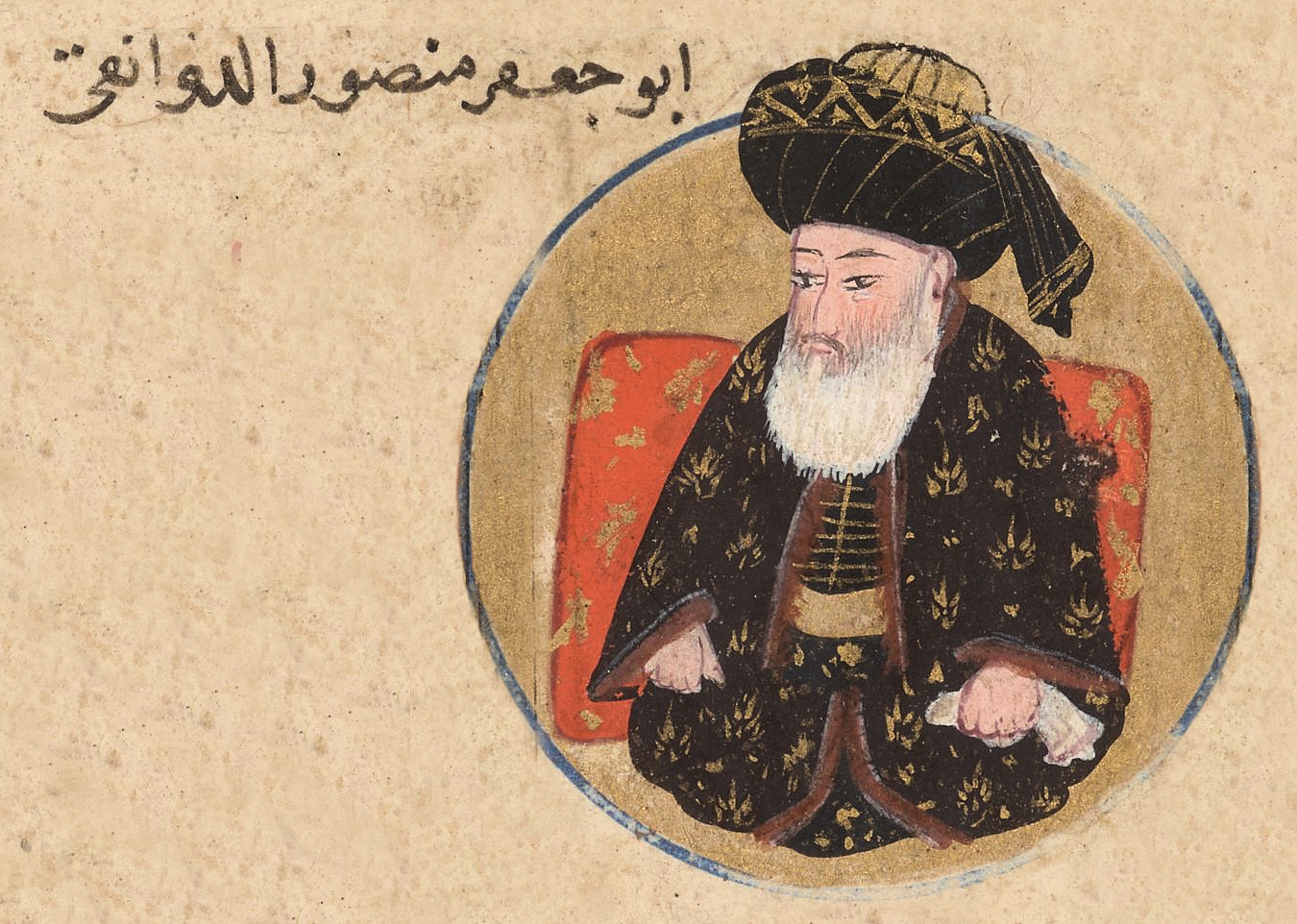
Portrait of al-Mansur (r. 754–775) from an Ottoman-era work, the "Cream of Histories" (Zübdet-üt Tevarih) in 1598

It was al-Saffah's successor, Abu Ja'far al-Mansur (r. 754–775) who firmly consolidated Abbasid rule and faced down internal challenges. His uncle, Abdallah ibn Ali, the victor over the Umayyads at the Battle of the Zab, was the most serious potential rival for leadership and al-Mansur sent Abu Muslim, the Khurasani revolutionary commander, against him in 754. After Abu Muslim successfully defeated him, al-Mansur then turned to eliminate Abu Muslim himself. He arranged to have him arrested and executed in 755.

On the western frontier, the Abbasids were unable to re-assert caliphal control over the western and central Maghreb, which the Umayyads had lost in the 740s. One member of the Umayyad dynasty, Abd al-Rahman, also managed to escape the purge of his family and established independent rule in al-Andalus (present-day Spain and Portugal) in 756, founding the Umayyad emirate of Córdoba.

In 756, al-Mansur had also sent over 4,000 Arab mercenaries to assist the Tang dynasty against the rebel leader An Lushan. The Abbasids, or "Black Flags" as they were commonly called, were known in Tang dynasty chronicles as the hēiyī Dàshí, "The Black-robed Tazi" (黑衣大食) ("Tazi" being a borrowing from Persian Tāzī, the word for "Arab"). (Note: Wade states "Tazi in Persian sources referred to a people in that land, but was later extended to cover Arab lands. The Persian term was adopted by Tang China (Dàshí :大食) to refer to the Arabs until the 12th century.") Later, Caliph Harun al-Rashid sent embassies to China and established good relations with the Tang emperors. After the war, these embassies remained in China and al-Rashid established an alliance with China. Several embassies from the Abbasid caliphs to the Chinese court have been recorded in the Old Book of Tang, the most important being those of al-Saffah, al-Mansur, and Harun al-Rashid.

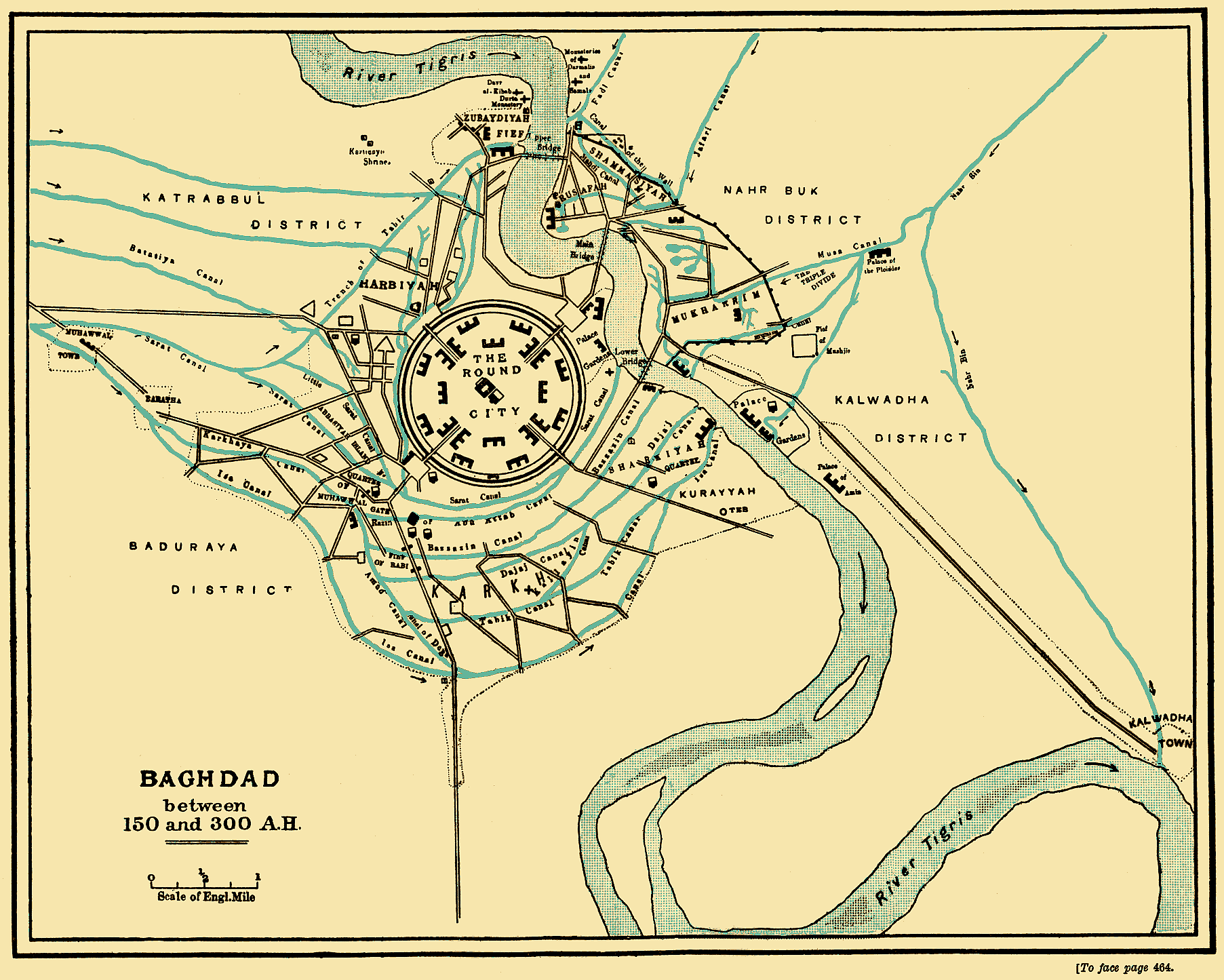
Plan of Baghdad between 767 and 912 CE, according to William Muir

In 762, al-Mansur suppressed a rebellion in the Hejaz led by al-Nafs al-Zakiyya, a descendant of Ali, whose challenge to the Abbasid claim to leadership was based on his Alid lineage and thus presented a serious political threat. He was defeated by an Abbasid army led by Isa ibn Musa. It was after this victory, in 762, that al-Mansur finally established a proper Abbasid capital, Baghdad – officially called Madinat al-Salam ('City of Peace') – located on the Tigris River, near the former ancient capital city of Ctesiphon. Prior to this, he had continued to consider multiple sites for a capital, including al-Hashimiyya, which he used as a capital for a while, and al-Rumiyya (near the ruins of Ctesiphon), which he used for a few months. Various other sites in the region also appear to have served as "capitals" under either al-Saffah or al-Mansur prior to the founding of Baghdad.

Al-Mansur centralised the judicial administration and, later, Harun al-Rashid established the institution of Great Qadi to oversee it. The Umayyad empire was mostly Arab; however, the Abbasids progressively became made up of more and more converted Muslims in which the Arabs were only one of many ethnicities. The Abbasids had depended heavily on the support of Persians in their overthrow of the Umayyads. Al-Mansur welcomed non-Arab Muslims to his court. While this helped integrate Arab and Persian cultures, it alienated many of their Arab supporters, particularly the Khurasani Arabs who had supported them in their battles against the Umayyads.

=== Golden age (775–861) ===
The Abbasid leadership had to work hard in the last half of the 8th century (750–800) under several competent caliphs and their viziers to usher in the administrative changes needed to keep order of the political challenges created by the far-flung nature of the empire, and the limited communication across it. It was also during this early period of the dynasty, in particular during the rule of al-Mansur, Harun al-Rashid, and al-Ma'mun, that its reputation and power were created.

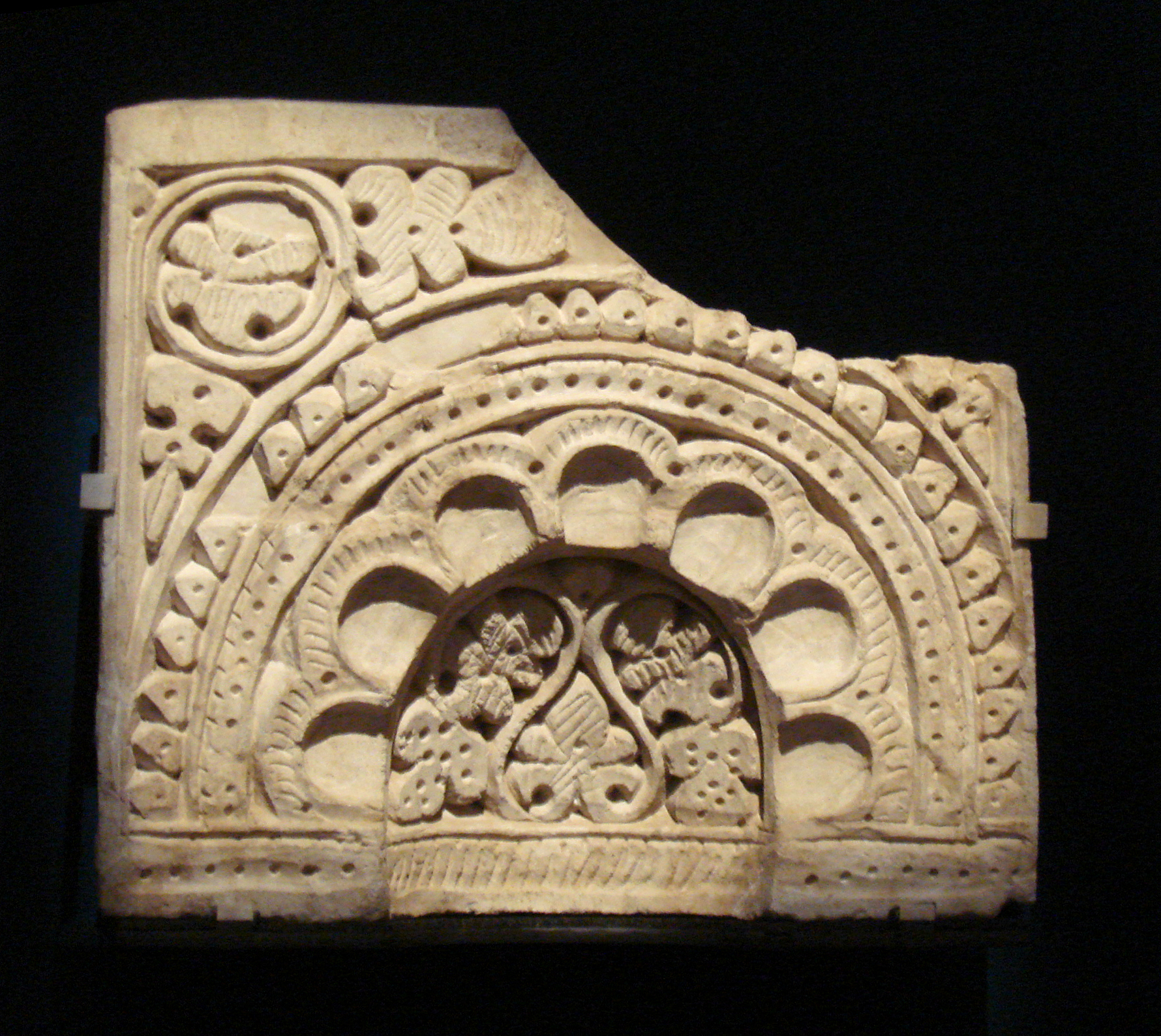
Decorated niche from the Abbasid mosque of Afrasiab, Samarkand in Sogdia, 750–825 CE

The position of wazir (vizier) developed in this period. It was initially akin to a secretary, but under the tenure of the Barmakids, an Iranian family close to the Abbasids, the position became powerful and Harun al-Rashid delegated state affairs to them for many years. This resulted in a more ceremonial role for many Abbasid caliphs compared with caliphal rule under the Umayyads; the viziers began to exert greater influence, and the role of the caliph's aristocracy was slowly replaced by the bureaucracy. At the western end of the empire, Harun al-Rashid agreed to grant the province of Ifriqiya (centered in present-day Tunisia) as a hereditary emirate to Ibrahim ibn al-Aghlab, who founded the Aghlabid dynasty there.

Under Harun al-Rashid's reign (r. 786–809), the Abbasid Empire reached its peak. His father, al-Mahdi (r. 775–785), restarted the fighting with the Byzantines, and his sons continued the conflict until Empress Irene pushed for peace. After several years of peace, Nikephoros I broke the treaty, then fended off multiple incursions during the first decade of the 9th century. These Abbasid attacks pushed into the Taurus Mountains, culminating with a victory at the Battle of Krasos and the massive invasion of 806, led by al-Rashid himself. Harun al-Rashid's navy also proved successful, taking Cyprus. Al-Rashid then focused on the rebellion of Rafi ibn al-Layth in Khurasan and died while there.

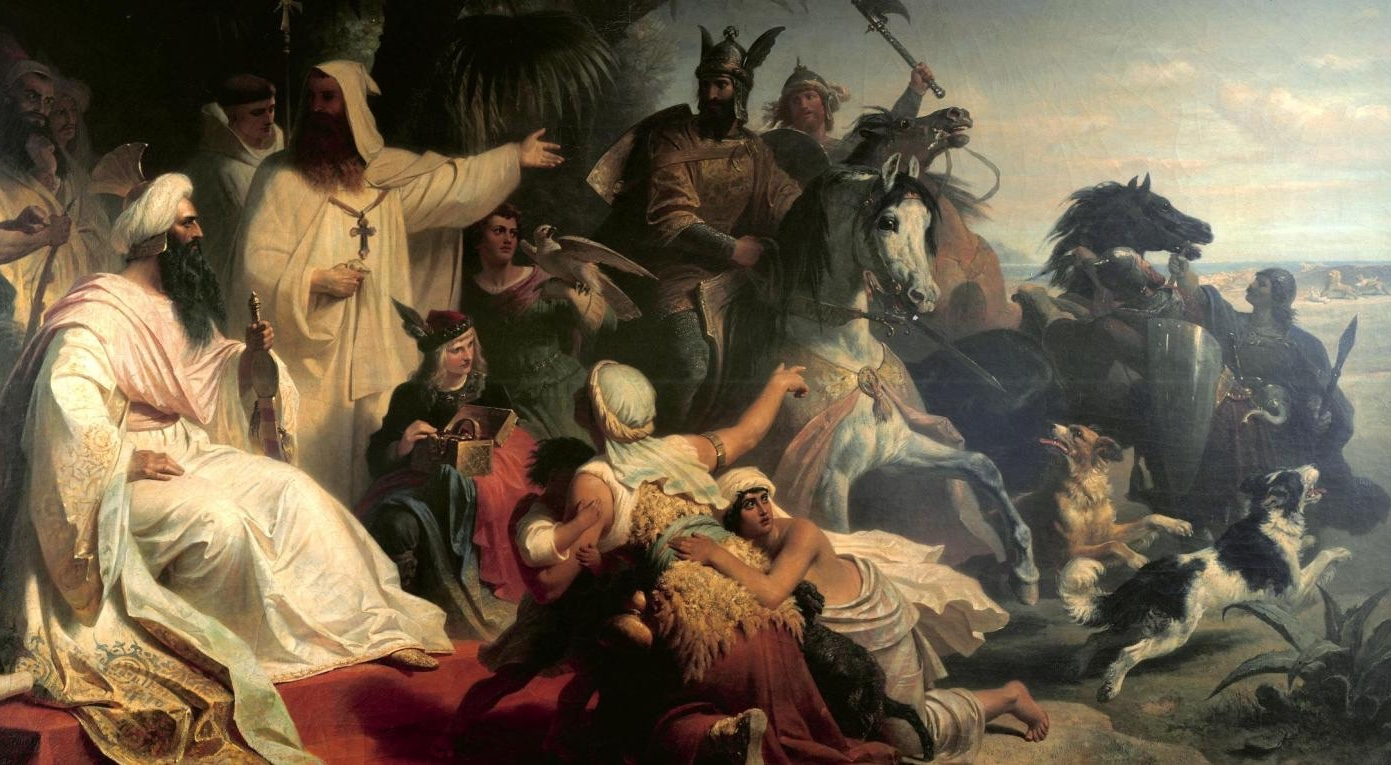
Harun al-Rashid (r. 786–809) receiving a delegation sent by Charlemagne at his court in Baghdad. Painting by Julius Köckert (1827–1918), dated 1864. Oil on canvas.

Domestically, al-Rashid pursued policies similar to those of his father al-Mahdi. He released many of the Umayyads and Alids his brother al-Hadi (r. 785–786) had imprisoned and declared amnesty for all political groups of the Quraysh. While Baghdad remained the official capital, al-Rashid chose to reside in Raqqa from 796 until the end of his reign. (Note: This city had previously been the residence of his father, al-Mahdi, whom al-Mansur had appointed its governor in 771. Al-Mahdi constructed a new city for himself, al-Rafiqa, next to Raqqa, and the two towns came to form a single urban agglomeration over time.) In 802, he established an unusual succession plan which decreed that his son al-Amin would inherit the title of Caliph and have control of Iraq and the western empire while his other son al-Ma'mun would rule Khurasan and most eastern parts of the empire. In 803, he turned on and imprisoned or killed most of the Barmakids, who had wielded administrative power on his behalf. The reasons for this sudden and ruthless move remain unclear and have been the subject of much discussion by contemporary writers and later historians.

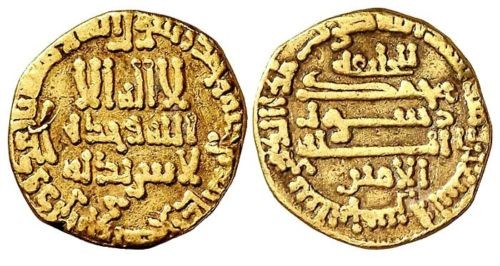
Gold dinar minted during the reign of al-Amin (809–813)

Al-Rashid's decision to split the succession proved to be damaging to the longevity of the empire. After his death in 809, his succession pact eventually collapsed and the empire was split by a civil war between al-Amin in Iraq and al-Ma'mun in Khurasan. This ended with a successful siege of Baghdad by al-Ma'mun's forces. When the city fell in 813, al-Amin was captured and executed on the orders of al-Ma'mun's general, Tahir ibn Husayn. This marked the first time that an Abbasid ruler was publicly executed and it irrevocably damaged the prestige of the caliphate.

Al-Ma'mun became caliph and ruled until his death in 833. He initially ruled the empire from his established base in Merv, Khurasan, where his main support was found, but this prolonged the discontent and instability in Iraq and triggered further fighting in the years following his victory. In 817, he officially declared an Alid, 'Ali al-Rida, as his heir, instead of an Abbasid family member, perhaps hoping to promote Muslim unity, but the move backfired. Eventually, he was compelled to step back from these policies and move his court to Baghdad, where he arrived in August 819. After this, the rest of his reign was relatively peaceful. Exceptions included a rebellion in Azerbaijan by the Khurramites, supported by the Byzantines, which continued until 837. He also repulsed a Byzantine attack on Syria around 829, followed by counter-attacks into Anatolia, and suppressed a rebellion in Egypt in 832.

The later years of al-Ma'mun's reign are known for his intellectual interests and patronage. The so-called "translation movement" — the state-sponsored translation of scientific and literary works of antiquity into Arabic — that had begun under his predecessors was pushed even further during this time and al-Ma'mun shifted its focus to ancient Greek works of science and philosophy. In matters of religion, his interest in philosophy spurred him to endorse Mu'tazilism, the rationalist school of Islamic thought. Under its influence, he officially endorsed the doctrine of createdness of the Qur'an in 827. In 833, he went further and forcibly imposed it on the ulama, the Sunni religious scholars. This controversial policy, known as the Mihna, was eventually abandoned in 848. Ultimately, it failed to convince the Sunni ulama and instead contributed to the emergence of the latter as a more cohesive social class whose views and interests did not always align with the caliph.

Following the civil war between al-Amin and al-Ma'mun, the traditional mainstay of the Abbasid army, the Khurasaniyya and 'Abna al-dawla, were no longer seen as reliable and the caliphs sought to recruit a new type of army whose loyalty could be better assured. This process began under al-Ma'mun but it is his brother and successor, al-Mu'tasim (r. 833–842), who is known for its more radical implementation. Soldiers were recruited from several new sources, but the most important, especially under al-Mu'tasim, were the group referred to by Arabic chronicles as "Turks" (atrāk), who appear to have been mainly Turkic people from Central Asia. Some modern scholars refer to them as Mamluks, marking them as the antecedent of the later slave-soldiers known by that term, but their exact legal status has been a subject of scholarly debate. Many, perhaps the majority, were originally purchased or captured slaves, but they were paid regular salaries and thus likely manumitted. In any case, these outsiders did not have political ties among the traditional elites and thus their loyalty was to the caliph alone.

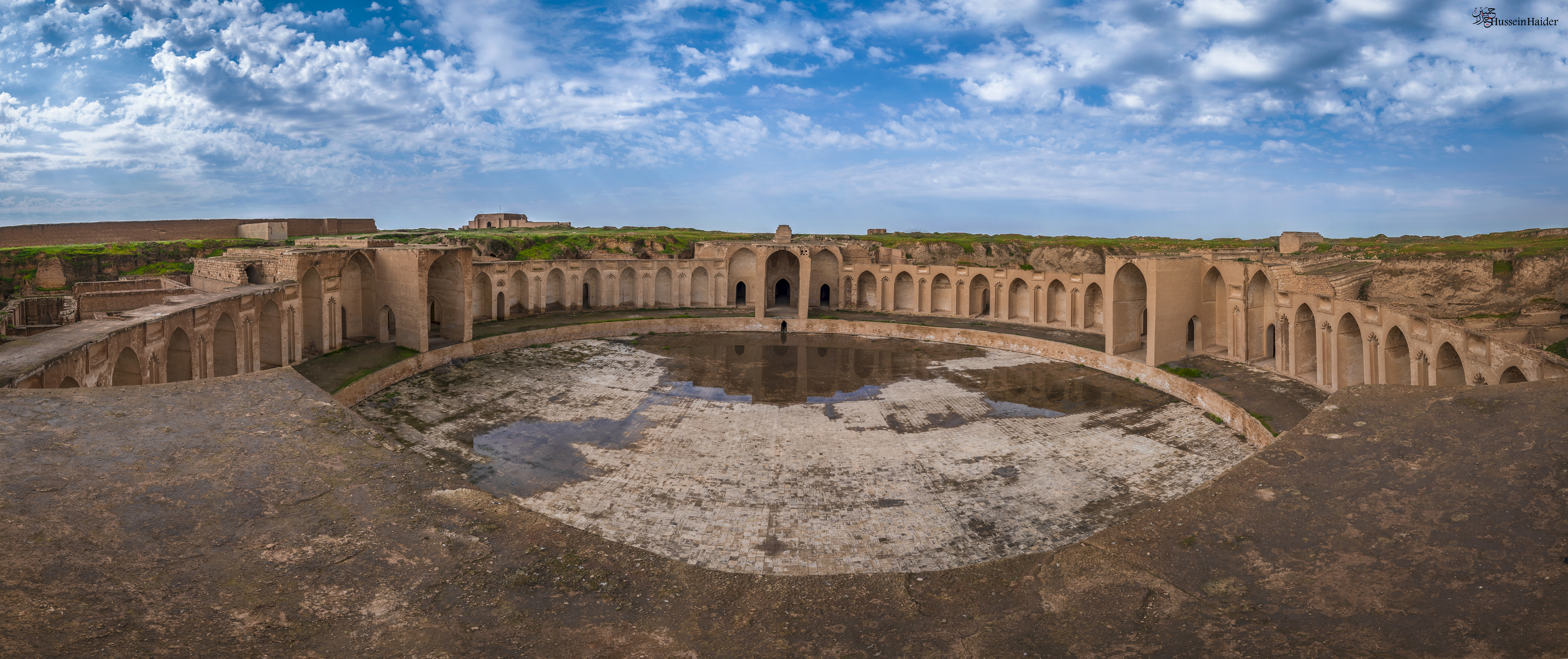
Partly-reconstructed remains of a courtyard with circular pool in the Dār al-Khilāfa, the caliph's palace, in Samarra, begun in 836

These troops were likely the first standing army of the caliphate and provided the caliph with a strong base of military support. However, the influx of new foreign troops into the capital created tensions with its inhabitants and with older elites. This was one of the main reasons why, in 836, al-Mu'tasim decided to found a new capital, Samarra, on an open site to the north of Baghdad. The new capital housed the caliph's army, allowed for the unhindered construction of massive new palaces, and became the focus of an even more elaborate courtly culture.

Al-Mu'tasim's reign marked the end of the strong caliphs. He strengthened his personal army with the Mamluks and promptly restarted the war with the Byzantines. Though his attempt to seize Constantinople failed when his fleet was destroyed by a storm, his military excursions were generally successful, culminating with a resounding victory in the Sack of Amorium.

=== Political fragmentation (861–945) ===
From the ninth century onward, the Abbasids found they could no longer keep together a centralized polity from Baghdad, which had grown larger than that of Rome. As mentioned, Harun al-Rashid had already granted the province of Ifriqiya to the Aghlabids, who ruled this region as an autonomous vassal state until its fall to the Fatimids in 909. In al-Ma'mun's reign, Tahir ibn Husayn (al-Ma'mun's general in the civil war) was appointed viceroy of Iran and most of the eastern regions of the empire from 821 onward. His descendants, the Tahirids, continued to govern in this position with significant autonomy until 873, although they remained loyal to the caliph and used only the title of amir. From their capital at Nishapur, they were important patrons of Arabic literature and Sunni religious scholarship, in addition to making major improvements to agriculture. In Transoxiana, the Persian Samanids of Bukhara and Samarkand ruled as local governors, initially under the Tahirids. They oversaw the development of the region's cities into major trade centers, profiting from long-distance trade between China, Central Asia, Eastern Europe, and the Middle East.

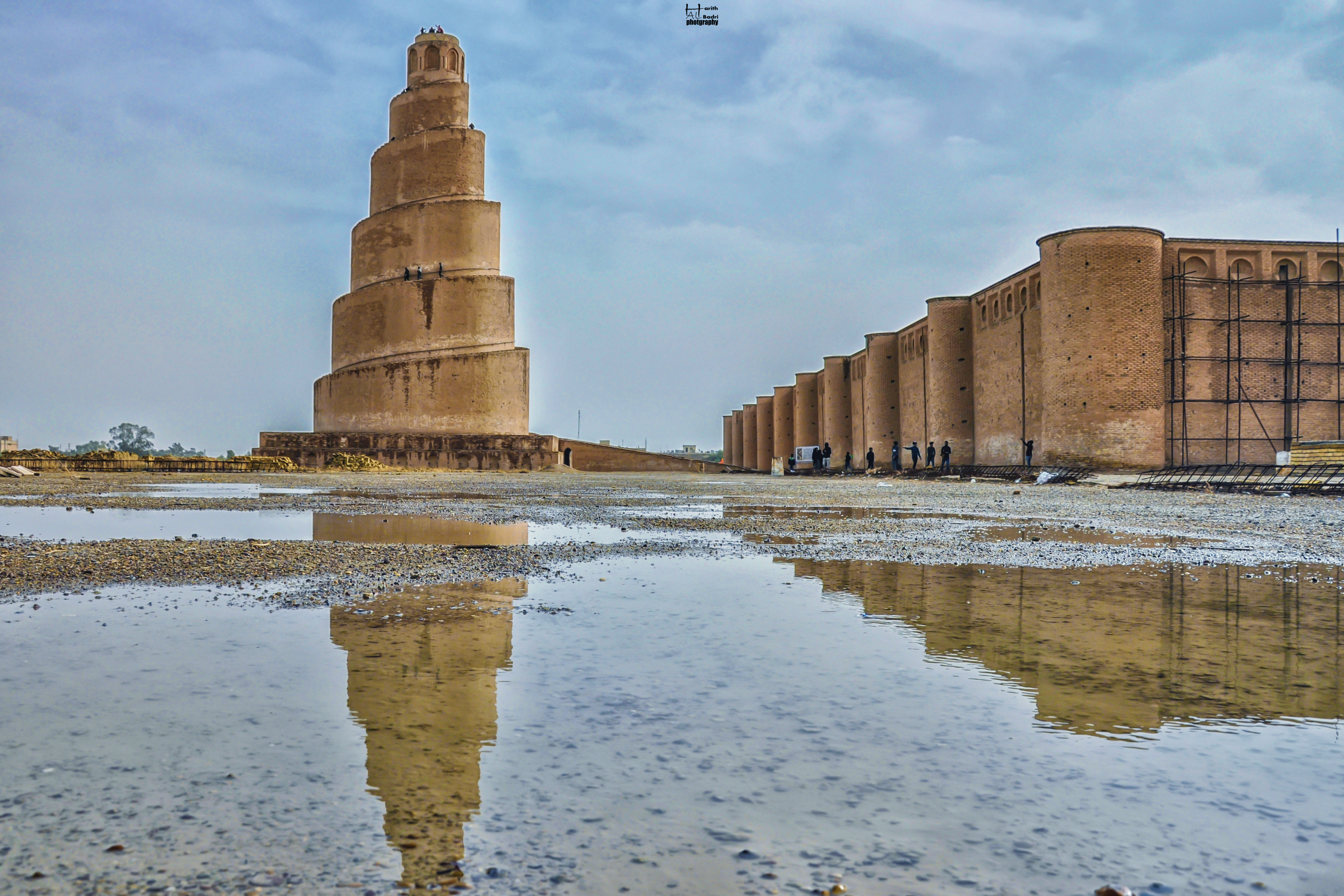
The walls and spiral minaret of the Great Mosque of Samarra, built from 848 to 852 CE in the Abbasid capital of Samarra

The reign of al-Mutawakkil (r. 847–861) was characterized by the caliph's extravagant spending, his attempts to further consolidate power within the state, and his replacement of the Mihna policy with support for more orthodox Sunni scholars, in particular the Hanbali school. In 853, the Byzantines sacked Damietta in Egypt, and the caliph responded by sending troops into Anatolia, who marauded until they were eventually annihilated in 863.

Al-Mutawakkil's lifestyle and spending weakened his support among the military. In 861, he was murdered at a party by a group of Turkish soldiers. This was the first time the Abbasid military intervened so directly and violently at court and it set a precedent for further coups. The following period, sometimes known as the "Anarchy at Samarra" (861–870), saw four different caliphs come and go. While they each attempted to reassert their authority, they were at the mercy of military and political factions. Tax collection lapsed and, along with al-Mutawakkil's previous spending, this left the state short on funds, which exacerbated the infighting.

In 865, the Turkish soldiers of Samarra even besieged Baghdad to overthrow the caliph al-Musta'in and, when the city fell the following year, they replaced him with al-Mu'tazz. The latter was overthrown by the same faction in 869 and replaced by al-Muhtadi, who was similarly overthrown in 870. Al-Muhtadi was succeeded by al-Mu'tamid, who was finally able to restore some order, in large part thanks to the help of his brother al-Muwaffaq, who kept the military under control and ran most government affairs. The restoration was hampered by the Zanj rebellion, which erupted in 869 and threatened the center of Abbasid control in Iraq. This major threat was not brought under control until a determined campaign was launched in 879.

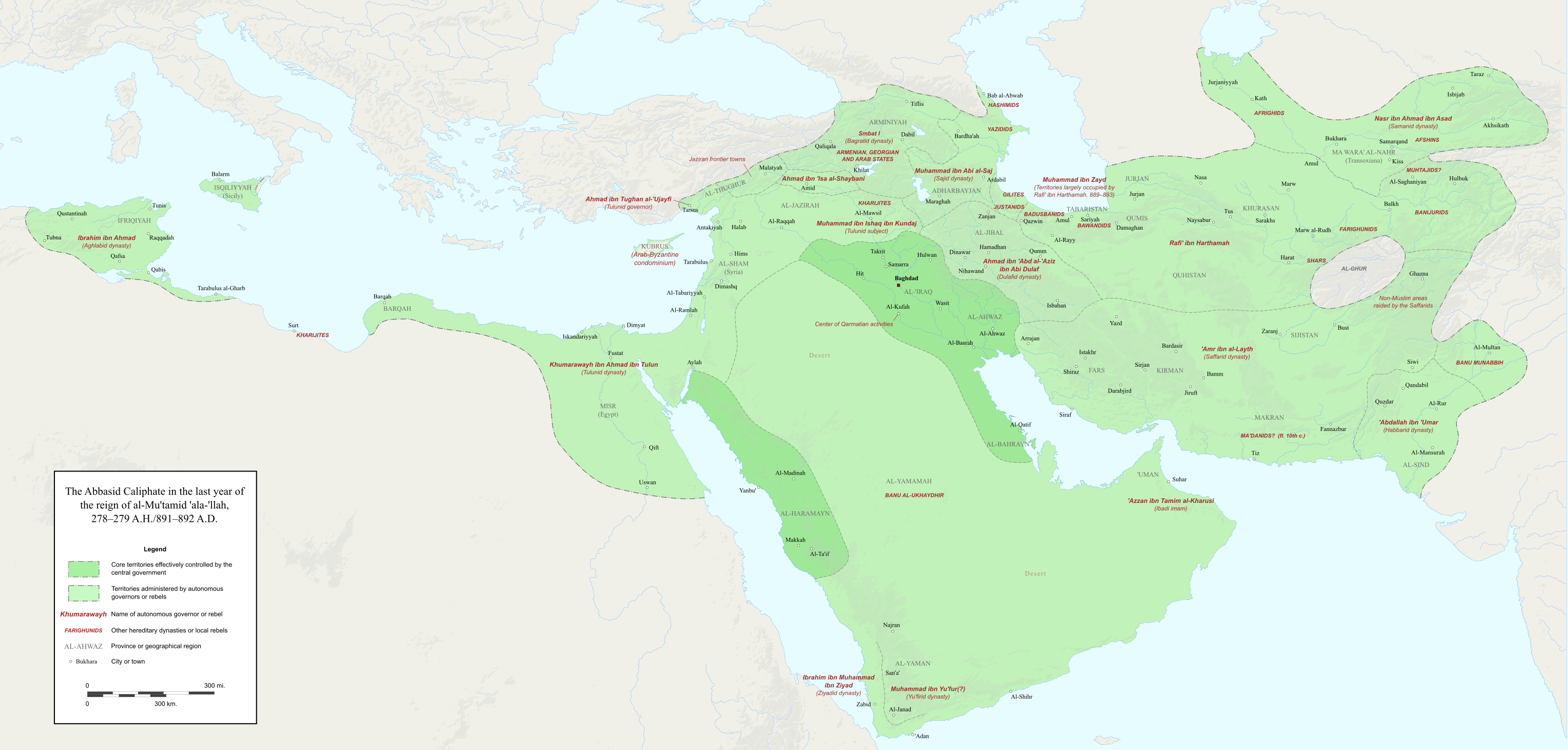
Map of the fragmented Abbasid empire c. 892, with areas still under direct control of the Abbasid central government (dark green) and under autonomous rulers adhering to nominal Abbasid suzerainty (light green)

By the 870s, Egypt became autonomous under Ahmad ibn Tulun and his Tulunid successors, though they continued to acknowledge the caliph and generally sent tribute to Baghdad. For a time, they even controlled Syria and parts of the Jazira (Upper Mesopotamia). In 882, the caliph al-Mu'tamid even tried to move his residence to Egypt at Ibn Tulun's invitation, though this move was aborted by the intervention of al-Muwaffaq.

In the east, the Saffarids were former soldiers in the Abbasid army who were stationed in Sistan and remained there as local strongmen. They began to challenge the Tahirids from 854 onward and in 873 they captured Nishapur, ending Tahirid rule. They marched on Baghdad in 876 but were defeated by al-Muwaffaq. The two sides were forced to come to terms and the Abbasids allowed the Saffarids to rule over Sistan, Fars, Kirman, and Khurasan.

In 898, al-Mu'tadid set the Saffarids and Samanids against each other by formally endorsing a Saffarid claim over Transoxiana, the Samanid domain. The Samanids emerged triumphant in battle and were able to expand their control thenceforth to Khurasan, while the Saffarids were contained further south. The Samanids never threatened Iraq or western Iran, but they were also not as close to the caliphs as their Tahirid predecessors and in practice they were almost entirely independent of Baghdad. They became even greater patrons of religion and the arts than the Tahirids. They still maintained an orthodox Sunni ideology but they differed from their predecessors by promoting the Persian language.

There was a brief Abbasid political and military revival at the end of the 9th century, especially under the policies of caliphs al-Mu'tadid (r. 892–902) and al-Muktafi (r. 902–908). Under al-Mu'tadid, the capital was moved from Samarra back to Baghdad. Incursions by the Qarmatians and allied Bedouin tribes posed a serious threat from 899 onwards, but the Abbasid army, led by Muhammad ibn Sulayman, won a reprieve against them in 904 and 907. In 905, the same general invaded Egypt and overthrew the weakened Tulunids, re-establishing Abbasid control to the west. By the time caliph al-Muktafi died in 908, the Abbasid revival was at its peak and a strong centralized state was in place again.

After his death, however, the state became dominated by feuding bureaucrats. Under al-Muqtadir (r. 908–932), the Abbasid court continued to project power and wealth publicly but the politics and financial policies of the time compromised the caliphate's sustainability in the long-term. It was in this period that the practice of giving out iqtas (fiefs in the form of tax farms) as favours began, which had the effect of reducing the caliphate's own tax revenues.

In 909, North Africa was lost to the Fatimid dynasty, an Isma'ili Shia sect tracing its roots to Muhammad's daughter Fatima. The Fatimids took control of Ifriqiya from the Aghlabids and eventually conquered Egypt in 969, where they established their capital, Cairo, near Fustat. By the end of the century, they were one of the main political and ideological challenges to Sunni Islam and the Abbasids, contesting the Abbasids for the titular authority of the Islamic ummah. The challenge of the Fatimid Caliphate only ended with their downfall in the 12th century.

Under the caliph al-Radi (r. 934–941), Baghdad's authority declined further as local governors refused to send payments to the capital. The Ikhshidids ruled Egypt and Syria autonomously prior to the Fatimid takeover. Even in Iraq, many governors refused to obey and the caliph was unable to send armies against them. Al-Radi was forced to invite the governor of Wasit, Muhammad ibn Ra'iq, to take over the administration under the newly created position of amir al-umara ("Commander of Commanders"). Ibn Ra'iq disbanded the salaried army of the caliph and reduced much of the government's bureaucratic infrastructure, including the traditional vizierate, thus removing much of the Abbasid state's basis for power. He was overthrown in 938 and the following years were bogged down in political turmoil.

Al-Mustakfi had a short reign from 944 to 946. It was during this period that the Buyids, a Persian faction from Daylam, swept into power by taking control of Baghdad and its bureaucracy. According to the history of Miskawayh, they began distributing iqtas to their supporters. This period of localized secular control was to last nearly 100 years.

Outside Iraq, all the autonomous provinces slowly took on the characteristic of de facto states with hereditary rulers, armies, and revenues and operated under only nominal caliph suzerainty, which may not necessarily be reflected by any contribution to the treasury, such as the Soomro emirs that had gained control of Sindh and ruled the entire province from their capital of Mansura. Mahmud of Ghazni took the title of sultan, as opposed to the amir that had been in more common usage, signifying the Ghaznavid Empire's independence from caliphal authority, despite Mahmud's ostentatious displays of Sunni orthodoxy and ritual submission to the caliph. In the 11th century, the loss of respect for the caliphs continued, as some Islamic rulers no longer mentioned the caliph's name in the Friday khutba, or struck it off their coinage.

=== Buyid and Seljuq control (945–1118) ===
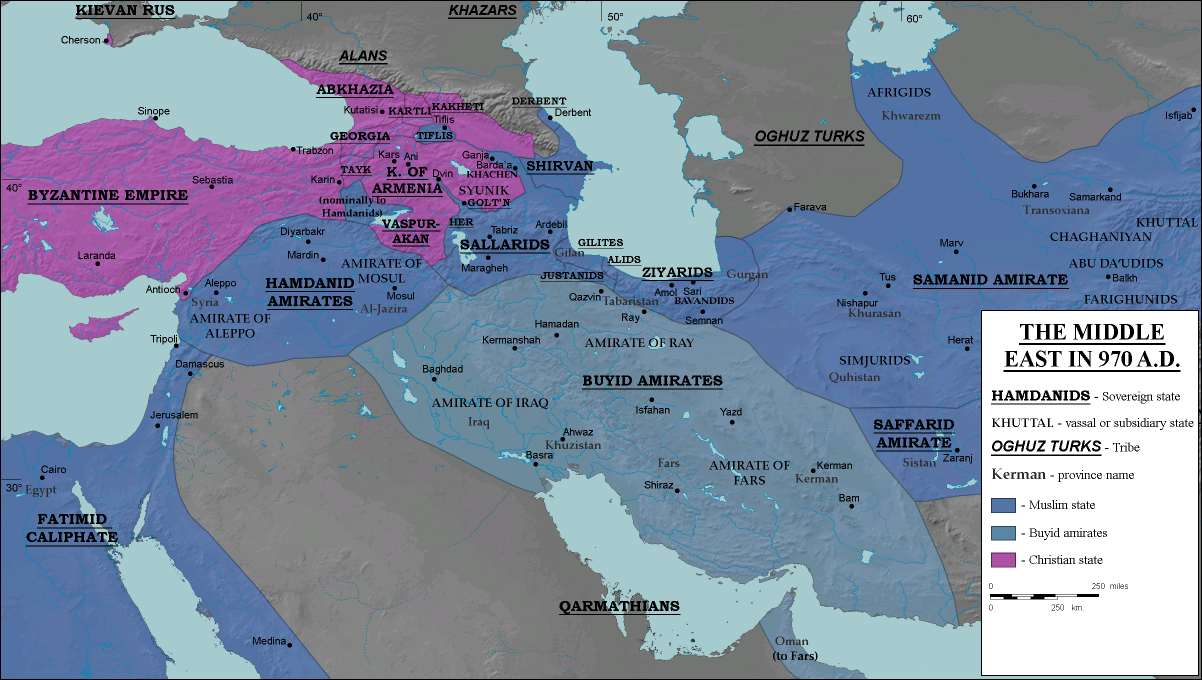
The Middle East c. 970, after the Abbasids came under the control of the Buyid dynasty

Despite the power of the Buyid amirs, the Abbasids retained a highly ritualized court in Baghdad, as described by the Buyid bureaucrat Hilal al-Sabi', and they retained a certain influence over Baghdad as well as religious life. As Buyid power waned with the rule of Baha al-Dawla, the caliphate was able to regain some measure of strength. The caliph al-Qadir, for example, led the ideological struggle against the Shia with writings such as the Baghdad Manifesto. The caliphs kept order in Baghdad itself, attempting to prevent the outbreak of fitnas in the capital, often contending with the ayyarun.

With the Buyid dynasty on the wane, a vacuum was created that was eventually filled by the dynasty of Oghuz Turks known as the Seljuqs. By 1055, the Seljuqs had wrested control from the Buyids and Abbasids, and took temporal power. When the amir and former slave Basasiri took up the Shia Fatimid banner in Baghdad in 1056–57, the caliph al-Qa'im was unable to defeat him without outside help. Toghril Beg, the Seljuq sultan, restored Baghdad to Sunni rule and took Iraq for his dynasty.

Once again, the Abbasids were forced to deal with a military power that they could not match, though the Abbasid caliph remained the titular head of the Islamic community. The succeeding sultans Alp Arslan and Malikshah, as well as their vizier Nizam al-Mulk, took up residence in Persia, but held power over the Abbasids in Baghdad. When the dynasty began to weaken in the 12th century, the Abbasids gained greater independence once again.

=== Revival of caliphal state (1118–1258) ===
Silver medallion made for the Abbasid caliph al-Muqtadir (r. 1136–80). Berlin, Staatliche Museum, Münzkabinett (now destroyed). The medallion has an inscription "al-Muqtadir bi-llāh" (ٱلْمُقْتَدِر بِٱللَّٰه "The one who is powerful through God"): it is uncertain if this medallion is also meant to portray al-Muqtadir.

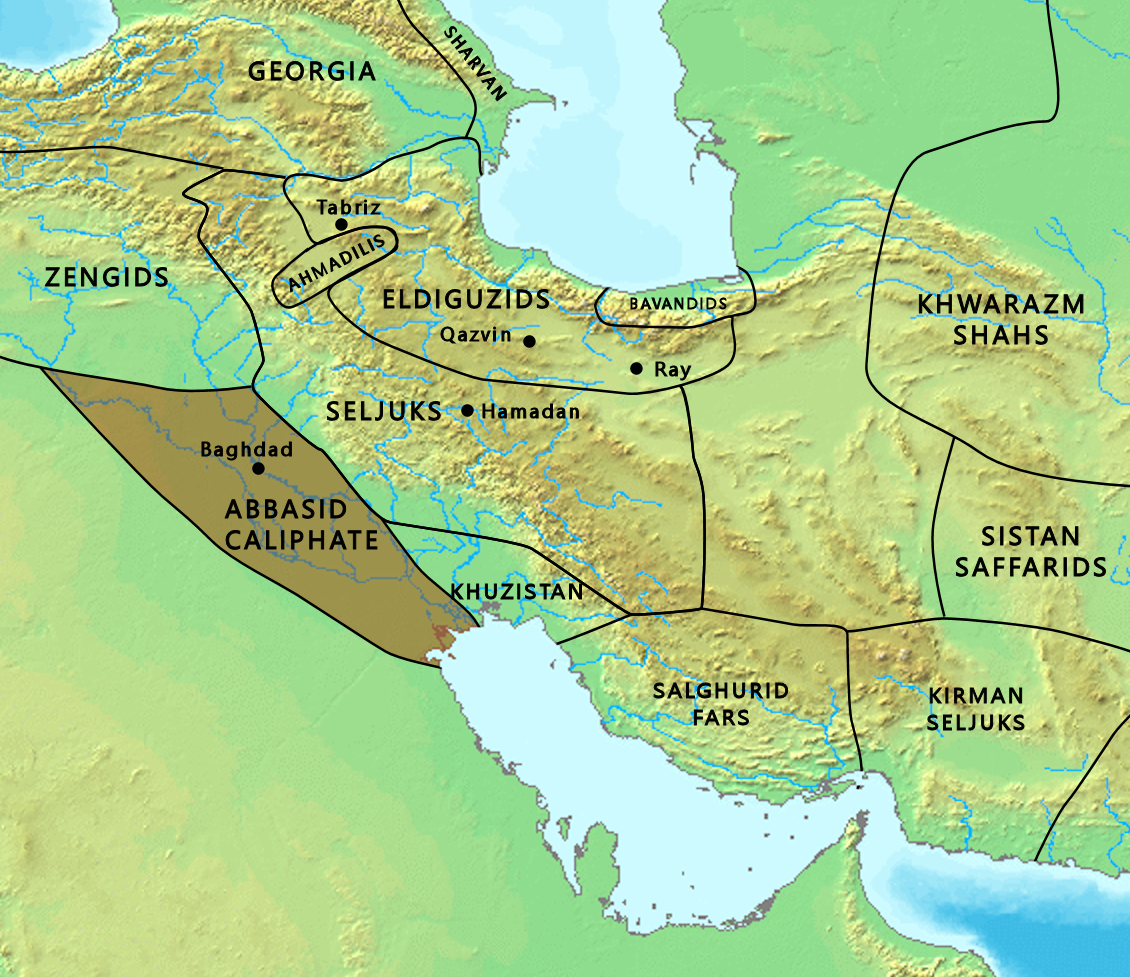
Approximate territory controlled by the Abbasids c. 1180, after gaining independence from the Seljuks

Caliph al-Mustarshid (r. 1118–1135) was the first caliph to build an army and to lead it in battle since the 10th century. He recruited Kurdish and Arab Bedouin tribes and re-fortified Baghdad. His first concern was not the Seljuks but the Mazyadids of Hilla in central Iraq, whom he met in battle in 1123. His bid for independence was ultimately unsuccessful, as he was defeated by a Seljuk army in 1135 and assassinated soon after.

Under al-Muqtafi (r. 1136–1160), a new caliphal state began to emerge with the help of his vizier Ibn Hubayra. Ibn Hubayra concentrated on reasserting authority in Iraq while the Seljuk Empire deteriorated. The Abbasids successfully defended Baghdad against the Seljuqs in the siege of 1157 and then conquered their Mazyadid enemies in Hilla in 1162. By the end of al-Muqtafi's reign, Baghdad controlled a state stretching from Basra in the south to the edges of Mosul in the north. After over two hundred years of Abbasid subjection to foreign dynasties, Caliph al-Mustanjid (r. 1160–1170) formally declared independence from the Seljuk sultans in 1165, when he dropped their names from Abbasid coinage. Initially, the caliphs were still vulnerable to the power of the viziers, but al-Mustadi (r. 1170–1180) was able to further rally some support from the Baghdad public as well as symbolic support abroad from the Ayyubid sultan Saladin and the Rum Seljuk sultan Kilij Arslan II.

The long reign of Caliph al-Nasir (r. 1180–1225) marked a definitive shift in late Abbasid power. He reinvigorated public displays of caliphal prestige, removed officials who were too powerful, engaged in diplomacy with regions beyond Iraq, and extended his control over former Seljuk territories in western Iran — including Isfahan, Hamadan, Qazvin and Zanjan. He sought to build up his influence among Muslim rulers abroad largely through the Sufi-inspired futuwwa brotherhood that he headed. Under caliph al-Mustansir (r. 1226–1242), the Abbasid state achieved significant stability and many of the same policies continued. He built the Mustansiriyya Madrasa, inaugurated in 1234, the first madrasa to teach all four Sunni maddhabs (schools of jurisprudence) and the first madrasa commissioned by an Abbasid caliph.

=== Mongol invasion and end ===
In 1206, Genghis Khan established a powerful dynasty among the Mongols of Central Asia. During the 13th century, this Mongol Empire conquered most of the Eurasian land mass, including both China in the east and much of the old Islamic caliphate and the Kievan Rus' in the west. In 1252, Hulagu Khan, a grandson of Genghis Khan and brother of the new Mongol ruler, Möngke Khan, was placed in charge of a new western campaign to the Middle East that would culminate in the conquest of Baghdad in 1258.

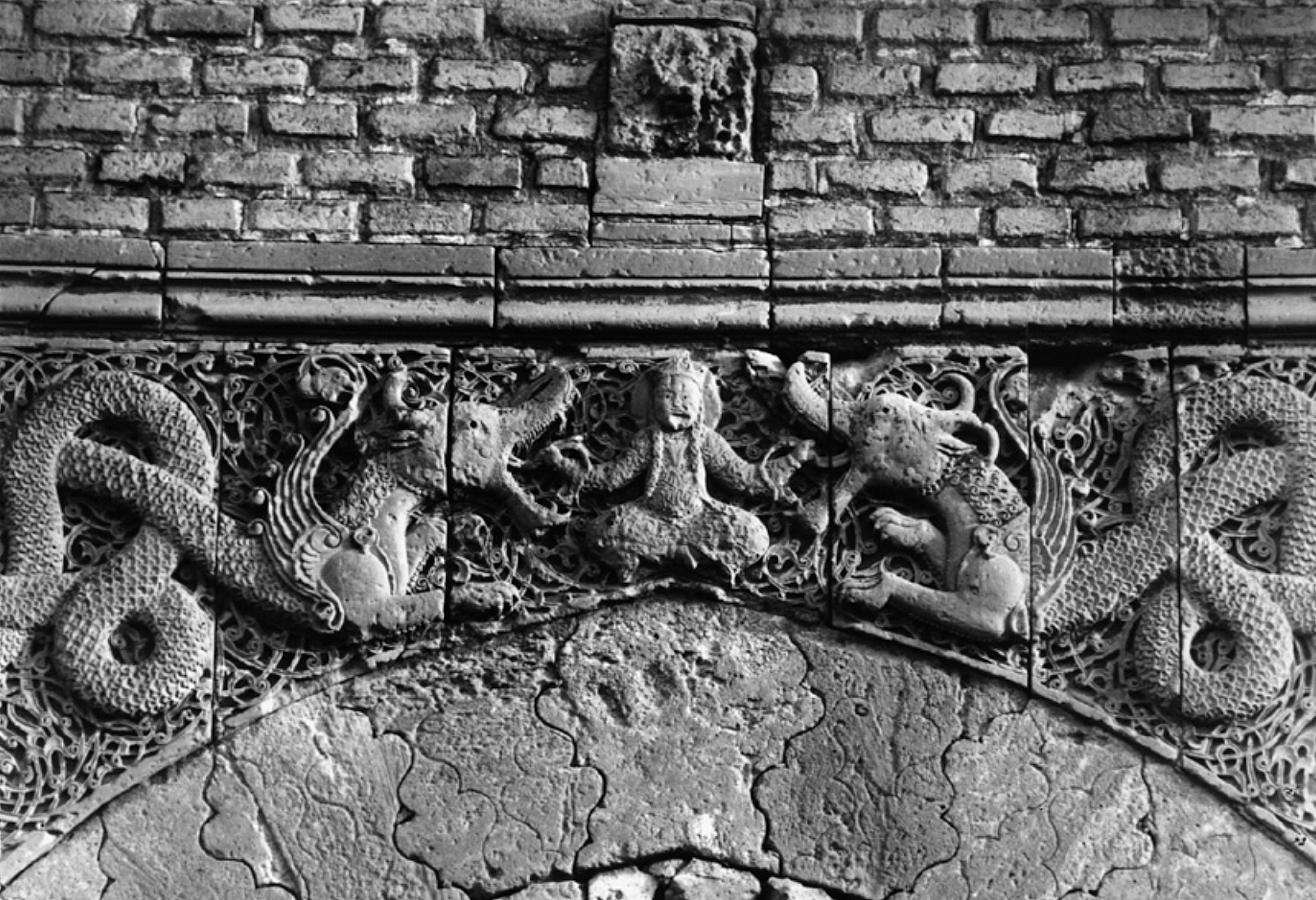
Carving on Bab al-Talsim, a Baghdad gate built by al-Nasir in 1221 (destroyed in 1917), possibly depicting the caliph wrestling dragons

In the years leading up to the Mongol invasion, Baghdad's strength was sapped by political rivalries, sectarian tensions between Sunnis and Shias, and damaging floods. In 1257, after destroying the Assassins in Iran, Hulagu wrote to the Abbasid caliph, al-Musta'sim, demanding his submission. The caliph refused, with Hulagu's status as a non-Muslim (unlike the earlier Buyids and Seljuks) likely a factor. There followed months of diplomacy, during which the Mongols may have been informed of Baghdad's weakness by correspondence with the caliph's vizier, Ibn al-Alqami, a Shia who was later accused of colluding with them.

The Mongols began their siege of the city on 29 January 1258. On 10 February, al-Musta'sim agreed to meet with Hulagu, who demanded that the caliph order the defenders to stand down and come out of the city in exchange for mercy. The caliph complied, but the Mongols slaughtered the population and then began the sack of the city on 13 February. Contemporary accounts describe destruction, looting, rape, and killing on a massive scale over many days, with hundreds of thousands killed and the city reduced to near-empty ruins, though some, like the Christian and Shia communities, were spared. The Mongols feared rumours that a supernatural disaster would strike if the blood of al-Musta'sim, a direct descendant of Muhammad's uncle and part of a dynasty that had reigned for five centuries, was spilled. As a precaution and in accordance with a Mongol taboo against spilling royal blood, Hulagu had al-Musta'sim wrapped in a carpet and trampled to death by horses on 20 February 1258. The caliph's immediate family was also executed, with the lone exceptions of his youngest son who was sent to Mongolia and a daughter who became a slave in the harem of Hulagu.

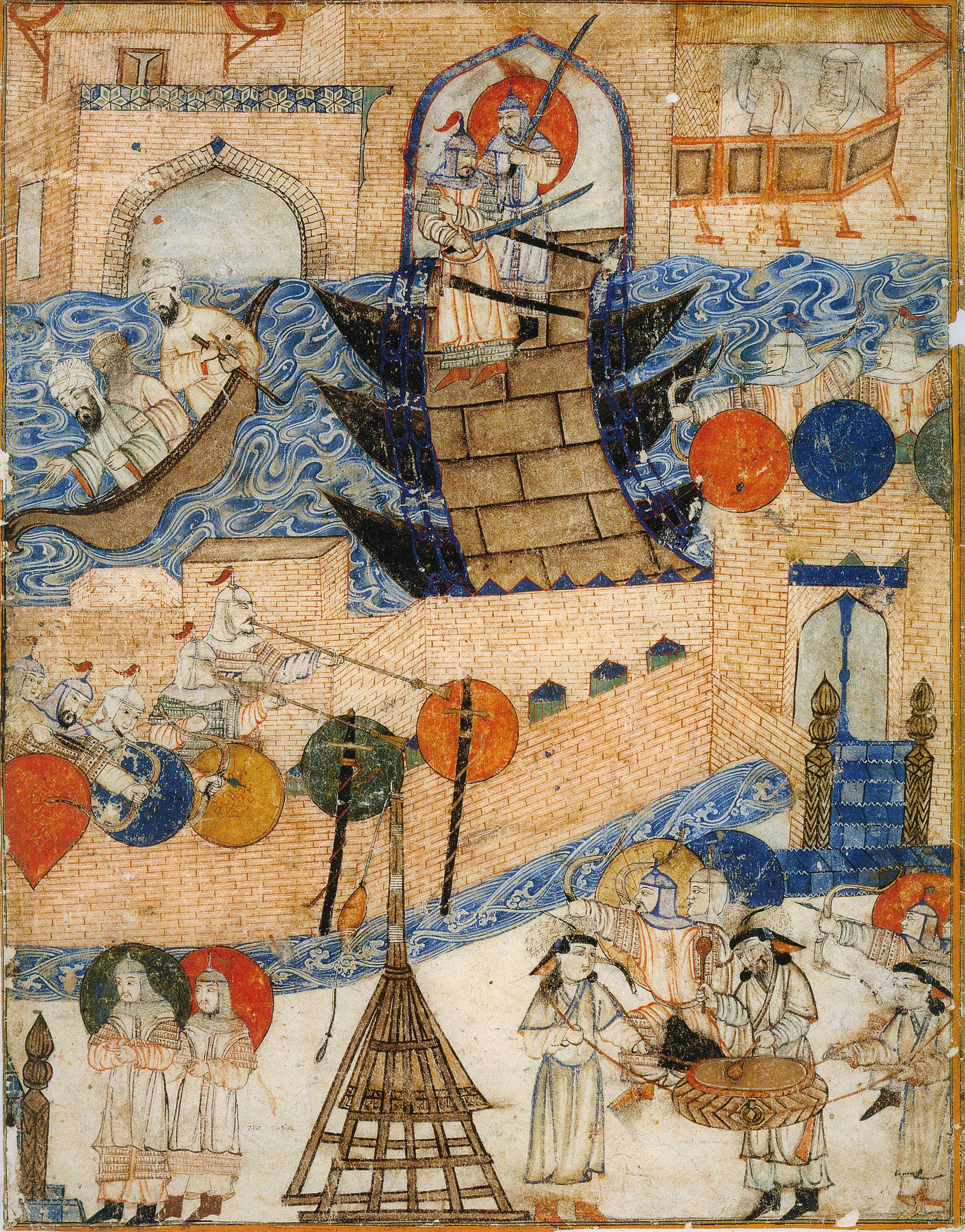
Siege of Baghdad by the Mongols led by Hulagu Khan in 1258, as illustrated in a copy of the 14th-century Jami' al-tawarikh

The fall of Baghdad marked the effective end of the Abbasid Caliphate. It made a deep impression on contemporary and later writers both inside and outside the Muslim world, some of whom created legendary stories about the last caliph's demise. It is also traditionally seen as the approximate end to the "classical age" or "golden age" of Islamic civilization. The events brought profound geopolitical changes to the traditional lands of the Islamic caliphate, with Iraq, Iran, and most of the eastern lands falling under Mongol control while other Muslim rulers retained the lands to the west. Mongol expansion further west was eventually halted by the Mamluks of Egypt at the Battle of Ain Jalut in 1260, followed by the conflict between the Ilkhanids (Hulagu and his successors) and their Golden Horde rivals, which diverted Mongol attention.

==== Abbasid caliphs in Cairo (1261–1517) ====
Prior to the Mongol invasion, the later Ayyubid sultans of Egypt had built up an army recruited from slaves, the Mamluks. During a political and military crisis in 1250, the Mamluks seized power and established what is now known as the Mamluk Sultanate. Following the devastation of Baghdad in 1258 and in an effort to secure political legitimacy for the new regime in Egypt, the Mamluk ruler Baybars invited a surviving member of the Abbasid family to establish himself in Cairo in 1260–1261. The new caliph was al-Mustansir II, a brother of the former caliph al-Mustansir. In 1262, he disappeared while leading a small army in an attempt to recapture Baghdad from the Mongols. Baybars subsequently replaced him with al-Hakim I, another Abbasid family member who had just been proclaimed in Aleppo.

Thereafter, the Abbasid caliphs in Cairo continued to exist as a strictly ceremonial but nonetheless important institution within the Mamluk Sultanate, conferring significant prestige on the Mamluks. It continued to be relevant even to other Muslim rulers until the 14th century; for example, the sultans of Delhi, the Muzaffarid sultan Muhammad, the Jalayirid sultan Ahmad, and the Ottoman sultan Bayezid I all sought diplomas of investiture from the caliph or declared nominal allegiance to him. Caliph al-Musta'in even managed to reign as sultan in Cairo for a brief six months in 1412.

During the 15th century, however, the institution of the caliph declined in significance. The last Abbasid caliph in Cairo was al-Mutawakkil III, who was in place when the Ottoman sultan Selim I defeated the Mamluks in 1516 and conquered Egypt in 1517, ending the Mamluk Sultanate. Selim I met with al-Mutawakkil III in Aleppo in 1516, prior to marching into Egypt, and the caliph was then sent to the Ottoman capital of Constantinople (present-day Istanbul), ending the Abbasid caliphate definitively. The Abbasids themselves slipped into historical obscurity after this. The idea of a "caliphate" subsequently became an ambiguous concept that was occasionally revisited by later Muslim rulers and intellectuals for political or religious reasons. The Ottoman sultans, who were thenceforth the most powerful Muslim rulers in western Asia and the Mediterranean, did not use the title of "caliph" at all before the mid-16th century and only did so vaguely and inconsistently afterwards. The claim that al-Mutawakkil III "transferred" the office of the caliph to the Ottoman sultan during their meeting in Aleppo is a legend that was elaborated in the 19th century and is not corroborated by contemporary accounts.

== Culture ==
=== Islamic Golden Age ===
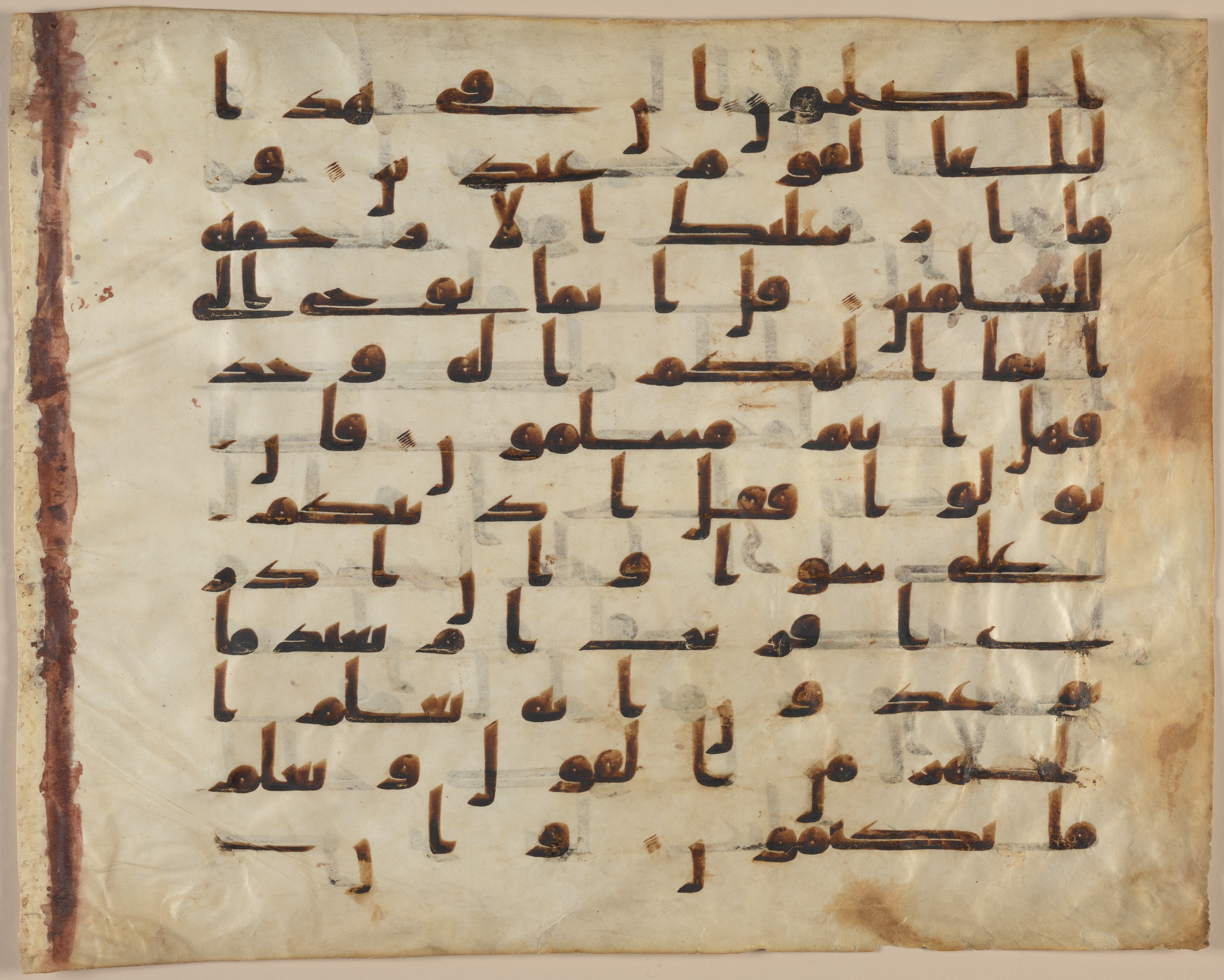
Page from the "Tashkent Qur'an", one of the oldest surviving Qur'an manuscripts, dating from the late 8th or early 9th century

The Abbasid historical period lasting to the Mongol conquest of Baghdad in 1258 CE is considered the Islamic Golden Age. The Islamic Golden Age was inaugurated by the middle of the 8th century by the ascension of the Abbasid Caliphate and the transfer of the capital from Damascus to Baghdad. The Abbasids were influenced by the Qur'anic injunctions and hadith, such as "the ink of a scholar is more holy than the blood of a martyr", stressing the value of knowledge. During this period the Muslim world became an intellectual center for science, philosophy, medicine and education as the Abbasids championed the cause of knowledge and established the House of Wisdom in Baghdad, where both Muslim and non-Muslim scholars sought to translate and gather all the world's knowledge into Arabic. Many classic works of antiquity that would otherwise have been lost were translated into Arabic and Persian and later in turn translated into Turkish, Hebrew and Latin. During this period the Muslim world was a cauldron of cultures which collected, synthesized and significantly advanced the knowledge gained from the Roman, Chinese, Indian, Persian, Egyptian, North African, Ancient Greek and Medieval Greek civilizations. According to Huff, "[i]n virtually every field of endeavor—in astronomy, alchemy, mathematics, medicine, optics and so forth—the Caliphate's scientists were in the forefront of scientific advance."

=== Literature ===
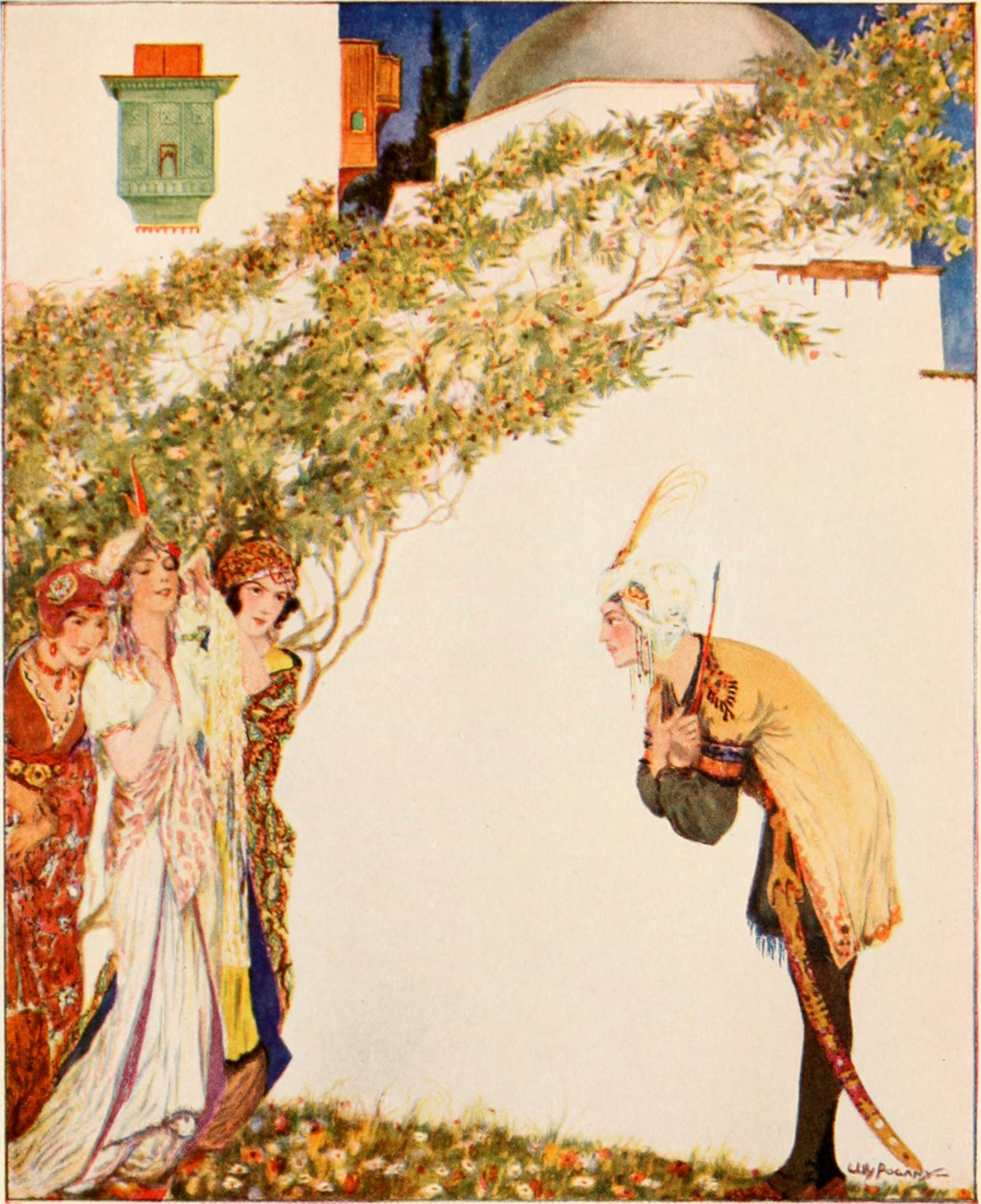
Illustration from More tales from the Arabian nights (1915)

Abbasid literary culture in Iraq reflects long-term Mesopotamian narrative continuities, particularly traditions centered on heroic figures and on barriers separating chaos and order. Core motifs associated with the Epic of Gilgamesh, mediated through the Alexander Romance, including journeys to the world's limits and the containment of chaos, persisted across religious and political change and continued to circulate in late antique Iraq. The Babylonian Talmud, composed by Iraq-based rabbis, preserves parallel traditions concerning Gog and Magog and the imagined edges of the world that confine agents of chaos. Together, these traditions situate elements of Abbasid literature within a Mesopotamian narrative continuum.

The best-known fiction from the Islamic world is One Thousand and One Nights, a collection of fantastical folk tales, legends and parables compiled primarily during the Abbasid era. The collection is recorded as having originated from an Arabic translation of a Sassanian-era Persian prototype, with likely origins in Indian literary traditions. Stories from Arabic, Persian, Mesopotamian, and Egyptian folklore and literature were later incorporated. The epic is believed to have taken shape in the 10th century and reached its final form by the 14th century; the number and type of tales have varied from one manuscript to another. All Arabian fantasy tales were often called "Arabian Nights" when translated into English, regardless of whether they appeared in The Book of One Thousand and One Nights. This epic has been influential in the West since it was translated in the 18th century, first by Antoine Galland. Many imitations were written, especially in France. Various characters from this epic have themselves become cultural icons in Western culture, such as Aladdin, Sinbad and Ali Baba.

A famous example of Islamic poetry on romance was Layla and Majnun, an originally Arabic story which was further developed by Iranian, Azerbaijani and other poets in the Persian, Azerbaijani, and Turkish languages. It is a tragic story of undying love much like the later Romeo and Juliet.

Arabic poetry reached its greatest height in the Abbasid era, especially before the loss of central authority and the rise of the Persianate dynasties. Writers like Abu Tammam and Abu Nuwas were closely connected to the caliphal court in Baghdad during the early 9th century, while others such as al-Mutanabbi received their patronage from regional courts.

Under Harun al-Rashid, Baghdad was renowned for its bookstores, which proliferated after the making of paper was introduced. Chinese papermakers had been among those taken prisoner by the Arabs at the Battle of Talas in 751. As prisoners of war, they were dispatched to Samarkand, where they helped set up the first Arab paper mill. In time, paper replaced parchment as the medium for writing, and the production of books greatly increased. These events had an academic and societal impact that could be broadly compared to the introduction of the printing press in the West. Paper aided in communication and record-keeping, it also brought a new sophistication and complexity to businesses, banking, and the civil service. In 794, Jafa al-Barmak built the first paper mill in Baghdad, and from there the technology circulated. Harun required that paper be employed in government dealings, since something recorded on paper could not easily be changed or removed, and eventually, an entire street in Baghdad's business district was dedicated to selling paper and books.

=== Philosophy ===
One of the common definitions for "Islamic philosophy" is "the style of philosophy produced within the framework of Islamic culture". Islamic philosophy, in this definition is neither necessarily concerned with religious issues, nor is exclusively produced by Muslims. Their works on Aristotle were a key step in the transmission of learning from ancient Greeks to the Islamic world and the West. They often corrected the philosopher, encouraging a lively debate in the spirit of ijtihad. They also wrote influential original philosophical works, and their thinking was incorporated into Christian philosophy during the Middle Ages, notably by Thomas Aquinas.

Three speculative thinkers, al-Kindi, al-Farabi, and Avicenna, combined Aristotelianism and Neoplatonism with other ideas introduced through Islam, and Avicennism was later established as a result. Other influential Abbasid philosophers include al-Jahiz, and Ibn al-Haytham (Alhacen).

=== Architecture ===
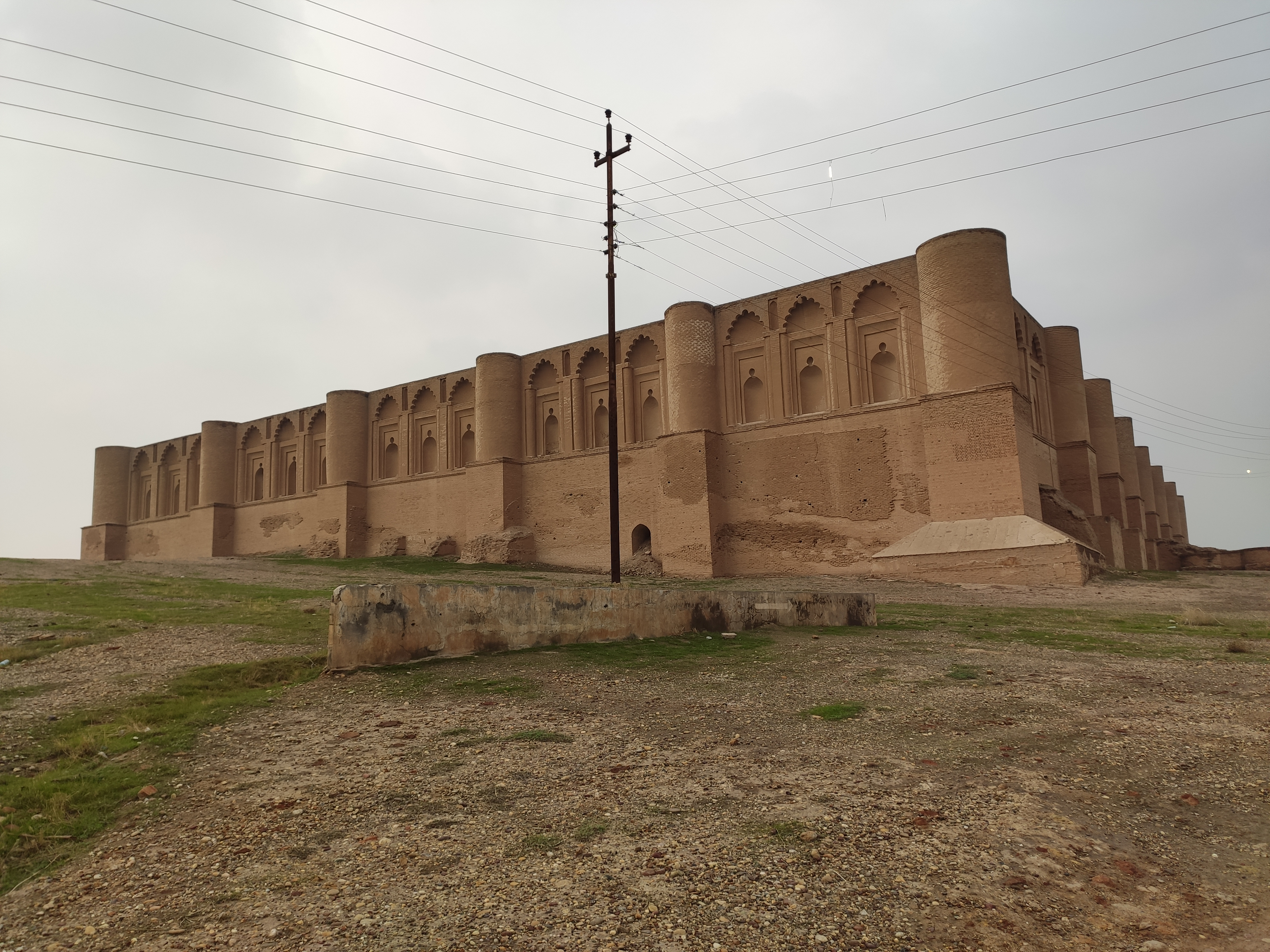
Qasr al-'Ashiq palace in Samarra, built between 877 and 882 CE

As power shifted from the Umayyads to the Abbasids, the architectural styles changed also, from Greco-Roman tradition (which features elements of Hellenistic and Roman representative style) to Eastern tradition which retained their independent architectural traditions from Mesopotamia and Persia.

A defining characteristic of Abbasid architecture in Iraq was the extensive use of stucco and plaster decoration, particularly in interior spaces. The limited availability of high-quality building stone in Abbasid Iraq contributed to the widespread use of stucco and other malleable materials, which were well suited to repetitive and abstract ornamental decoration. At Samarra, these conditions enabled the emergence of a standardized decorative vocabulary that departed from Late Antique naturalism and proved influential well beyond Iraq. Color also played an important role, particularly the use of blue pigments to enhance stucco and painted surfaces, intensifying abstraction and, in some contexts, carrying protective or apotropaic associations.

The Abbasid architecture was particularly influenced by Sasanian architecture, which in turn featured elements present since ancient Mesopotamia. The Christian styles evolved into a style based more on the Sasanian Empire, utilizing mud bricks and baked bricks with carved stucco. Other architectural innovations and styles were few, such as the four-centered arch, and a dome erected on squinches. Unfortunately, much was lost due to the ephemeral nature of the stucco and luster tiles.

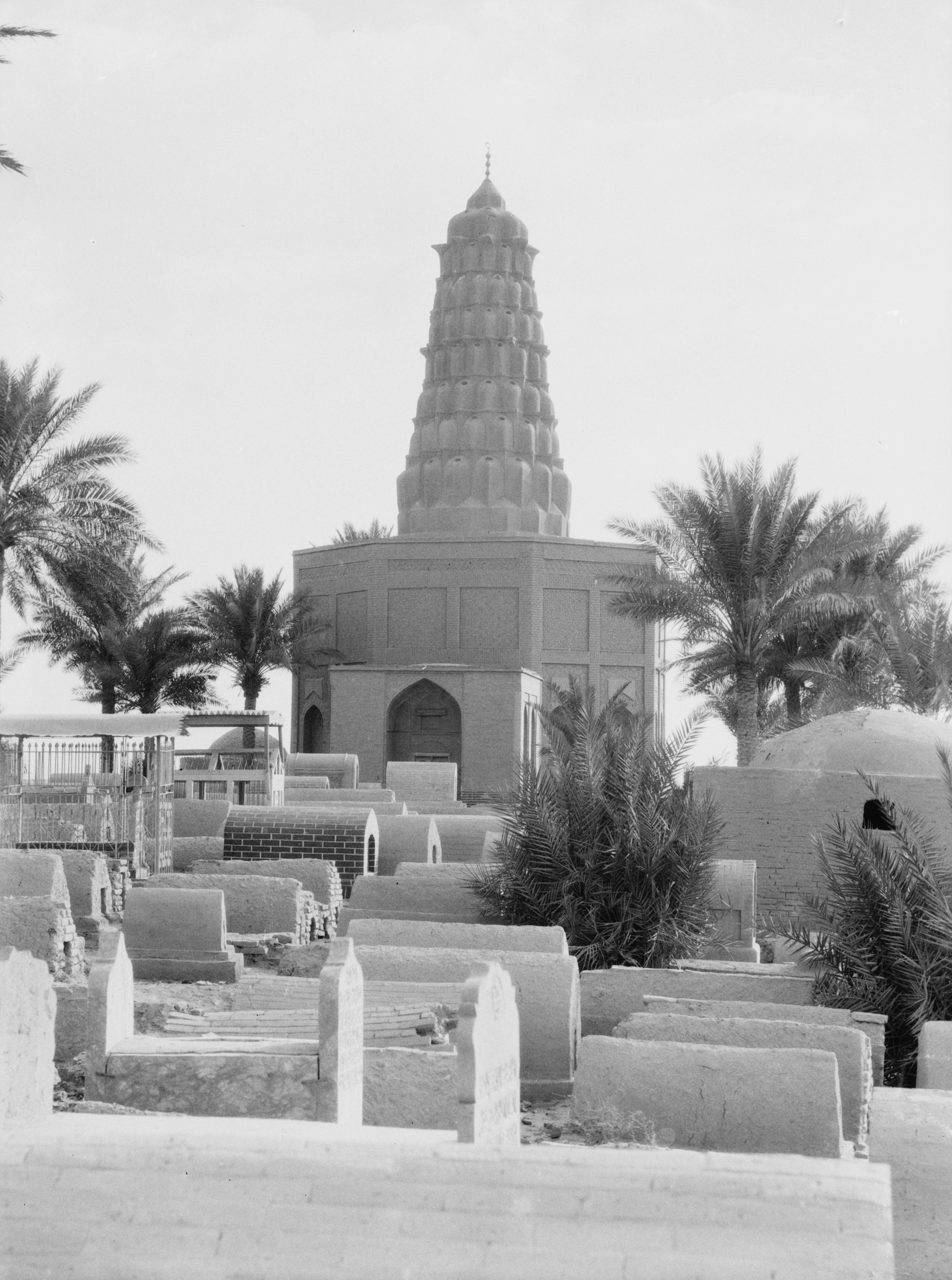
Zumurrud Khatun Tomb (c. 1152), in a cemetery at Baghdad

Another major development was the creation or vast enlargement of cities as they were turned into the capital of the empire, beginning with the creation of Baghdad in 762, which was planned as a walled city with four gates, and a mosque and palace in the center. Al-Mansur, who was responsible for the creation of Baghdad, also planned the city of Raqqa, along the Euphrates. Finally, in 836, al-Mu'tasim moved the capital to a new site that he created along the Tigris, called Samarra. This city saw 60 years of work, with race-courses and game preserves to add to the atmosphere. Due to the dry remote nature of the environment, some of the palaces built in this era were isolated havens. Al-Ukhaidir Fortress is a fine example of this type of building, which has stables, living quarters, and a mosque, all surrounding inner courtyards. Iraq only has one surviving mausoleum from this era, in Samarra: an octagonal domed structure known as the Qubbat al-Sulaibiyya, which is the first known monumental tomb in Islamic architecture and may be the final resting place of al-Muntasir.

Baghdad, the epicenter of the empire, was originally organized in a circular fashion next to the Tigris River, with massive brick walls being constructed in successive rings around the core by a workforce of 100,000 with four huge gates (named Kufa, Basra, Khurasan and Syria). The central enclosure of the city contained Mansur's palace of 360,000 square feet (33,000 m^{2}) in area and the great mosque of Baghdad, encompassing 90,000 square feet (8,400 m^{2}). Travel across the Tigris and the network of waterways allowing the drainage of the Euphrates into the Tigris was facilitated by bridges and canals servicing the population.

Outside the Abbasid heartlands, architecture was still influenced by the capital. In present-day Tunisia, the Great Mosque of Kairouan was founded under the Umayyad dynasty but completely rebuilt in the 9th century under the patronage of the Aghlabids, vassals of the Abbasids. The styles utilized were mainly Abbasid. In Egypt, Ahmad Ibn Tulun commissioned the Ibn Tulun Mosque, completed in 879, that is based on the style of Samarra and is now one of the best-preserved Abbasid-style mosques from this period.

=== Arts ===
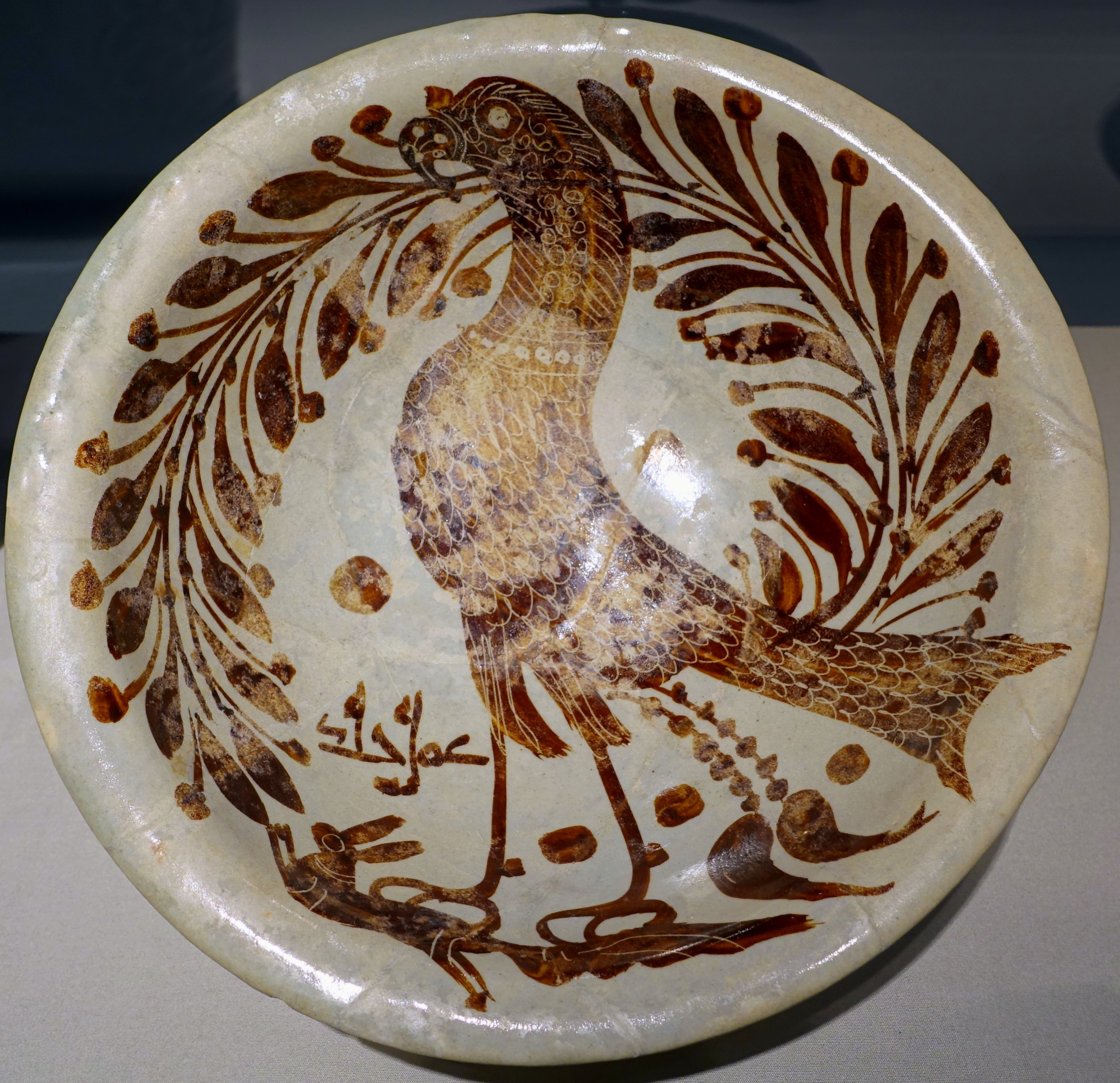
Lustreware bowl from 9th century Samarra

The establishment of Abbasid power based in Iraq, rather than Syria, resulted in a cultural and artistic development influenced not only by the Mediterranean and Middle Eastern traditions but also by connections further afield with India, Central Asia, and China. The importation of Chinese ceramics elicited local imitations but also stirred innovations in local production. Abbasid ceramics became a more important art form with greater emphasis on decoration. A major innovation was the emergence of monochrome and polychrome lustreware, a technical achievement that had an important impact on the wider development of Islamic ceramics. Glassware also became a more important art form and was likely the origin of the lustre technique that was introduced into ceramics. Few textiles have survived but the production of tiraz, textiles with royal inscriptions, is well attested.

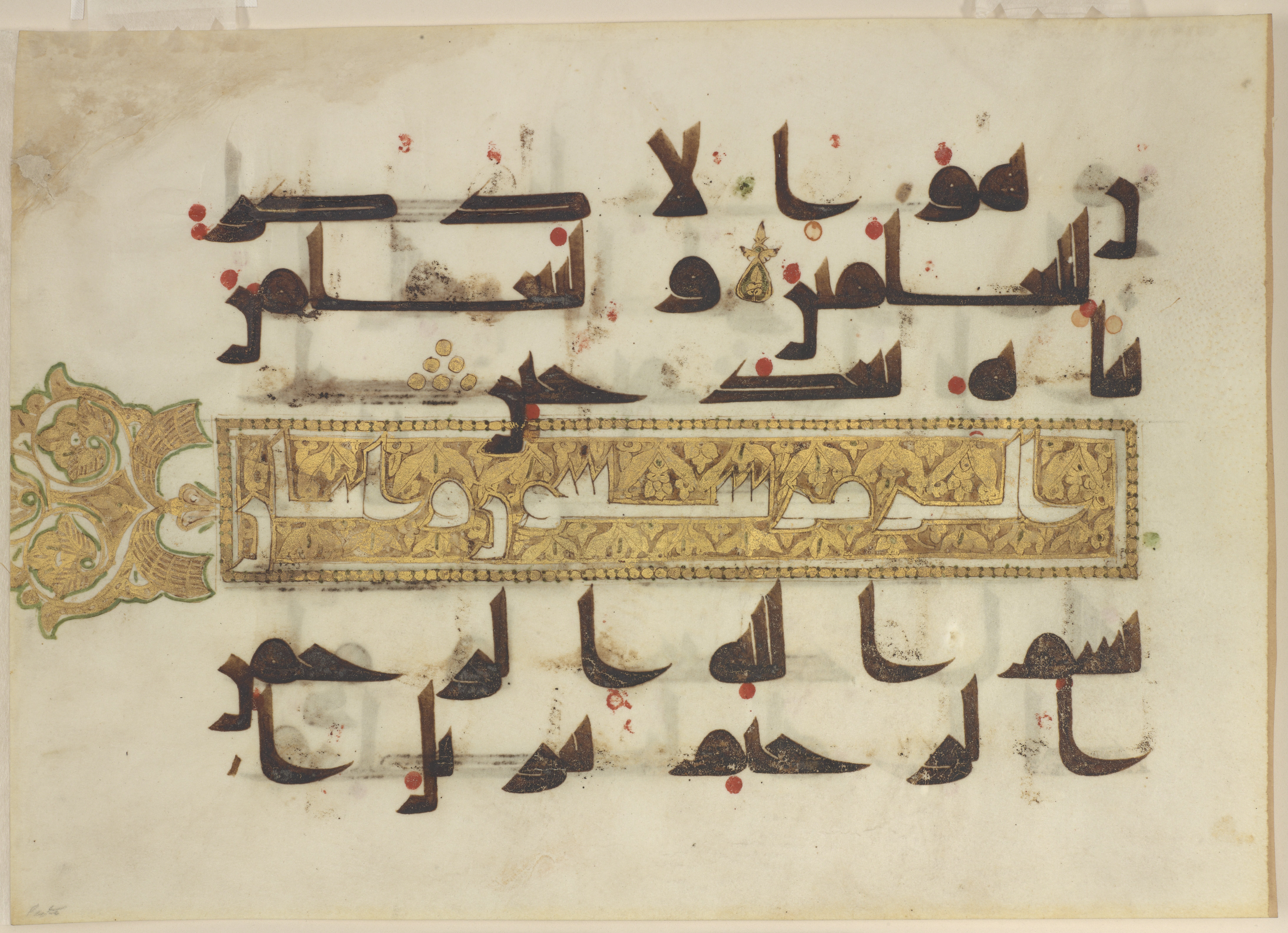
Folio from a Qur'an with Kufic script and gold illumination, from 8th or 9th century

Another major art form was calligraphy and manuscript production. During the Abbasid period, Arabic calligraphy evolved into a more refined discipline. Rounded Kufic script was typical and became increasingly stylized. Parchment only allowed for a few lines of script, but from the late 8th century onward paper began to be produced. Qur'ans are the main type of book to have survived from this period.

== Science and technology ==
=== Science ===
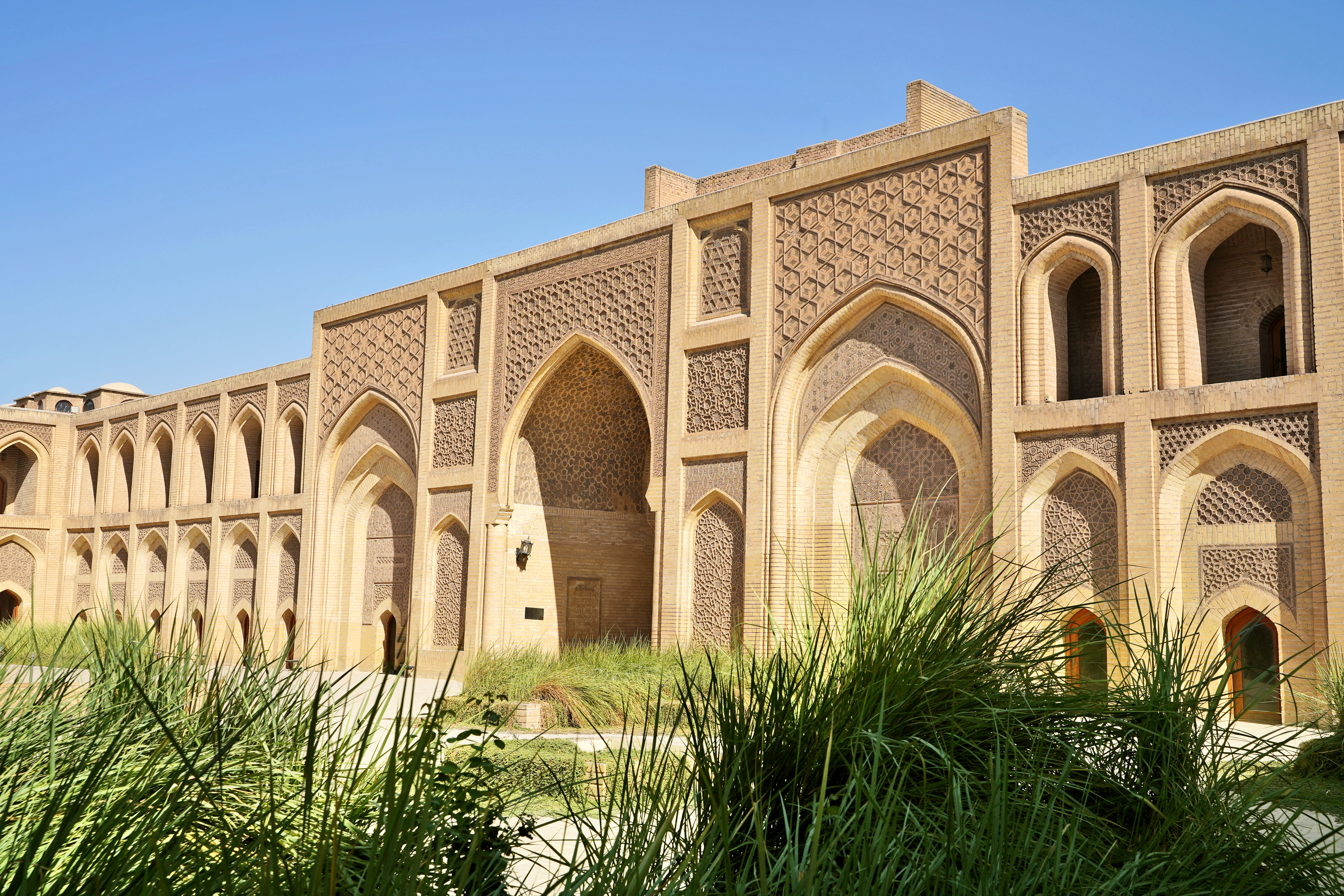
The Mustansiriyya Madrasa in Baghdad, established in 1227, one of the few Abbasid-era madrasas remaining today

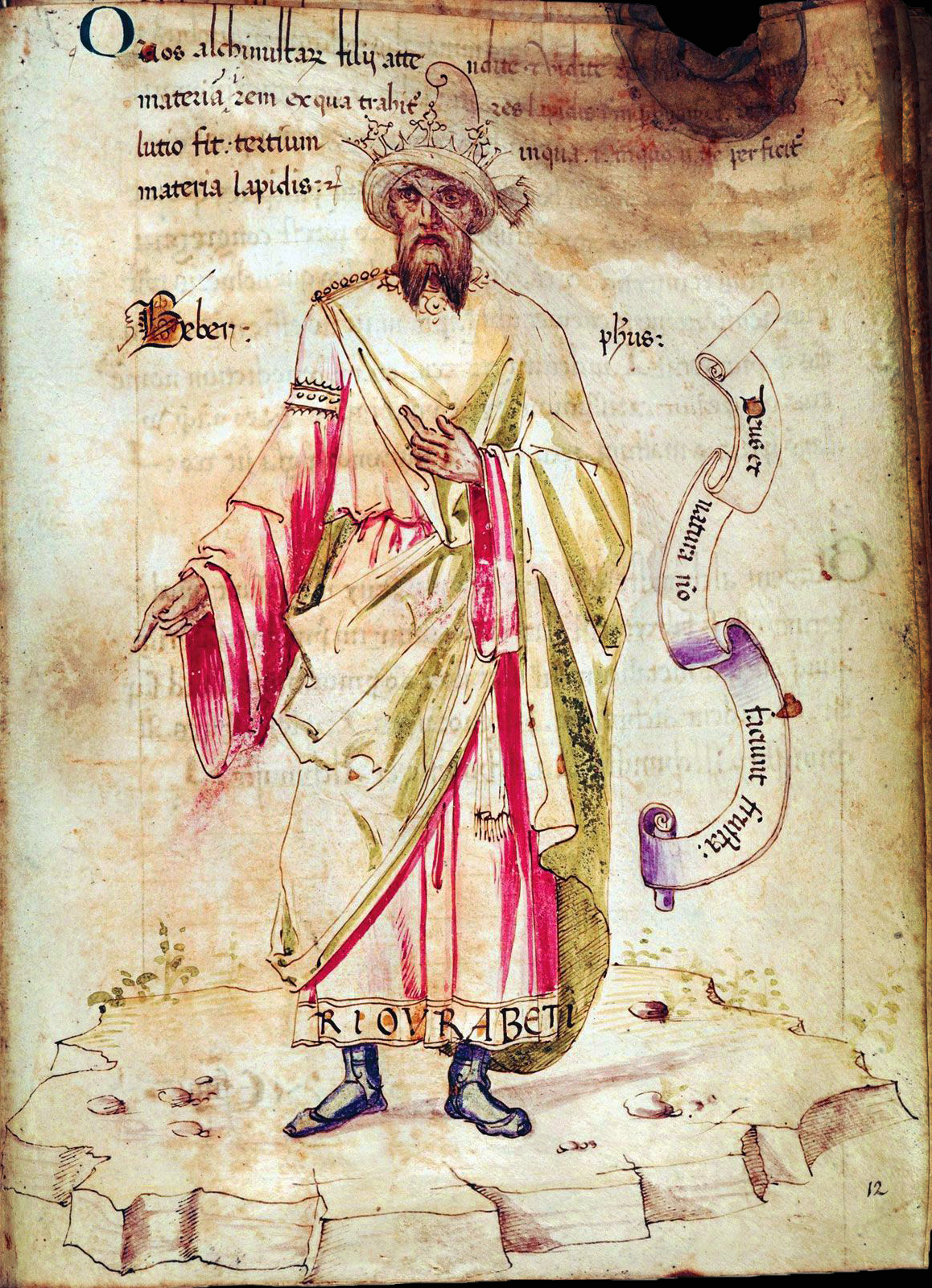
Jabir ibn Hayyan, a pioneer in organic chemistry. The reigns of Harun al-Rashid (786–809) and his successors fostered an age of great intellectual achievement. In large part, this was the result of the schismatic forces that had undermined the Umayyad regime, which relied on the assertion of the superiority of Arab culture as part of its claim to legitimacy, and the Abbasids' welcoming of support from non-Arab Muslims.

A number of medieval thinkers and scientists living under Islamic rule played a role in transmitting Islamic science to the Christian West. In addition, the period saw the recovery of much of the Alexandrian mathematical, geometric and astronomical knowledge, such as that of Euclid and Claudius Ptolemy. These recovered mathematical methods were later enhanced and developed by other Islamic scholars, notably by Persian scientists Al-Biruni and Abu Nasr Mansur.

Christians (particularly Nestorian Christians) contributed to the Arab Islamic Civilization during the Umayyads and the Abbasids by translating works of Greek philosophers to Syriac and afterwards to Arabic. Nestorians played a prominent role in the formation of Arab culture, with the Academy of Gondishapur being prominent in the late Sassanid, Umayyad and early Abbasid periods. Notably, eight generations of the Nestorian Bukhtishu family served as private doctors to caliphs and sultans between the eighth and eleventh centuries.

Algebra was significantly developed by Persian scientist Muhammad ibn Mūsā al-Khwārizmī during this time in his landmark text, Kitab al-Jabr wa-l-Muqabala, from which the term algebra is derived. He is thus considered to be the father of algebra by some, although the Greek mathematician Diophantus has also been given this title. The terms algorism and algorithm are derived from the name of al-Khwarizmi, who was also responsible for introducing the Arabic numerals and Hindu–Arabic numeral system beyond the Indian subcontinent.

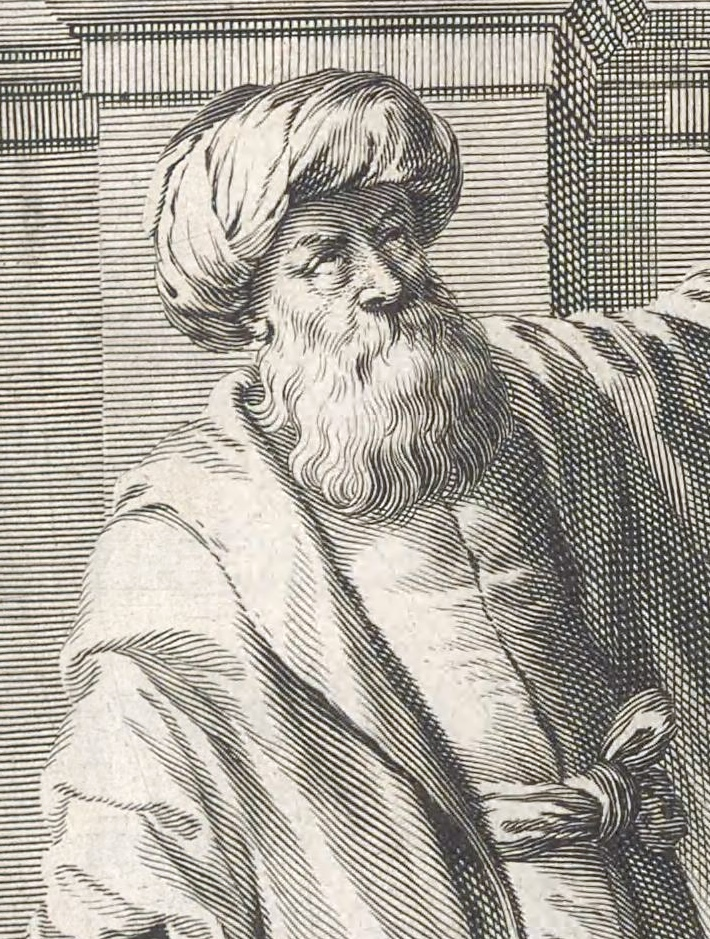
Ibn al-Haytham, "the father of Optics"

Arab scientist Ibn al-Haytham (Alhazen) developed an early scientific method in his Book of Optics (1021). The most important development of the scientific method was the use of experiments to distinguish between competing scientific theories set within a generally empirical orientation, which began among Muslim scientists. Ibn al-Haytham's empirical proof of the intromission theory of light (that is, that light rays entered the eyes rather than being emitted by them) was particularly important. Ibn al-Haytham was significant in the history of scientific method, particularly in his approach to experimentation, and has been referred to as the "world's first true scientist".

Medicine in medieval Islam was an area of science that advanced particularly during the Abbasids' reign. During the 9th century, Baghdad contained over 800 doctors, and great discoveries in the understanding of anatomy and diseases were made. The clinical distinction between measles and smallpox was described during this time. Famous Persian scientist Ibn Sina (known to the West as Avicenna) produced treatises and works that summarized the vast amount of knowledge that scientists had accumulated, and was very influential through his encyclopedias, The Canon of Medicine and The Book of Healing. The work of him and many others directly influenced the research of European scientists during the Renaissance.

Astronomy in medieval Islam was advanced by Al-Battani, who improved the precision of the measurement of the precession of the Earth's axis. The corrections made to the geocentric model by al-Battani, Averroes, Nasir al-Din al-Tusi, Mo'ayyeduddin Urdi and Ibn al-Shatir were later incorporated into the Copernican heliocentric model. The astrolabe, though originally developed by the Greeks, was developed further by Islamic astronomers and engineers, and subsequently brought to medieval Europe.

Muslim alchemists influenced medieval European alchemists, particularly the writings attributed to Jābir ibn Hayyān (Geber).

=== Technology ===
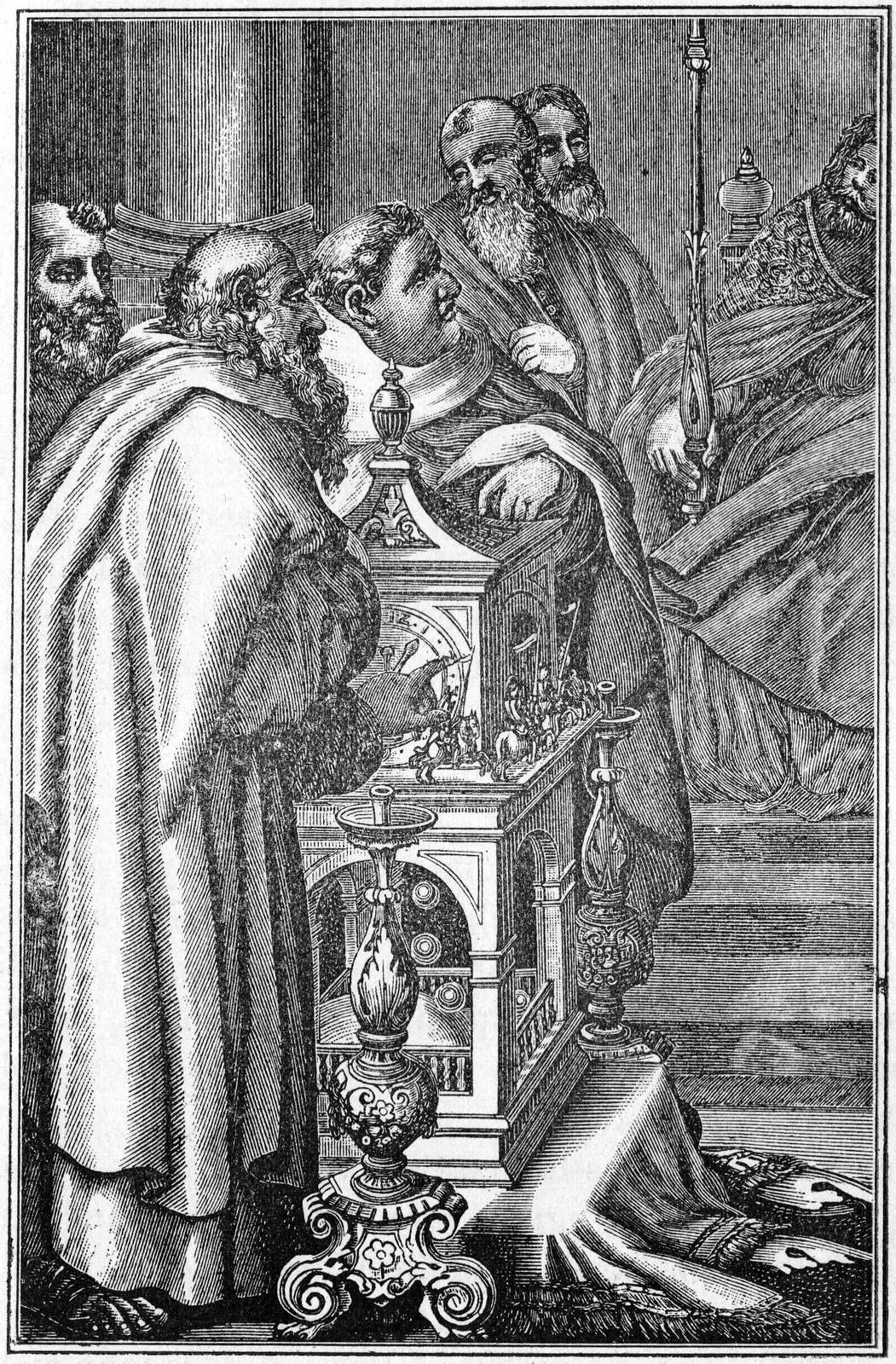
Illustration showing a water clock given to Charlemagne by Harun al-Rashid

In technology, the Abbasids adopted papermaking from China. The use of paper spread from China into the caliphate in the 8th century CE, arriving in al-Andalus (Islamic Spain) and then the rest of Europe in the 10th century. It was easier to manufacture than parchment, less likely to crack than papyrus, and could absorb ink, making it ideal for making records and copies of the Qur'an. "Islamic paper makers devised assembly-line methods of hand-copying manuscripts to turn out editions far larger than any available in Europe for centuries." It was from the Abbasids that the rest of the world learned to make paper from linen. The knowledge of gunpowder was also transmitted from China via the caliphate, where the formulas for pure potassium nitrate and an explosive gunpowder effect were first developed.

Advances were made in irrigation and farming, using new technology such as the windmill. Crops such as almonds and citrus fruit were brought to Europe through al-Andalus, and sugar cultivation was gradually adopted by the Europeans. Apart from the Nile, Tigris and Euphrates, navigable rivers were uncommon, so transport by sea was very important. Navigational sciences were highly developed, making use of a rudimentary sextant (known as a kamal). When combined with detailed maps of the period, sailors were able to sail across oceans rather than skirt along the coast. Abbasid sailors were also responsible for reintroducing large three masted merchant vessels to the Mediterranean. The name caravel may derive from an earlier Arab ship known as the qārib. Arab merchants dominated trade in the Indian Ocean until the arrival of the Portuguese in the 16th century. Hormuz was an important center for this trade. There was also a dense network of trade routes in the Mediterranean, along which Muslim countries traded with each other and with European powers such as Venice or Genoa. The Silk Road crossing Central Asia passed through the Abbasid caliphate between China and Europe.

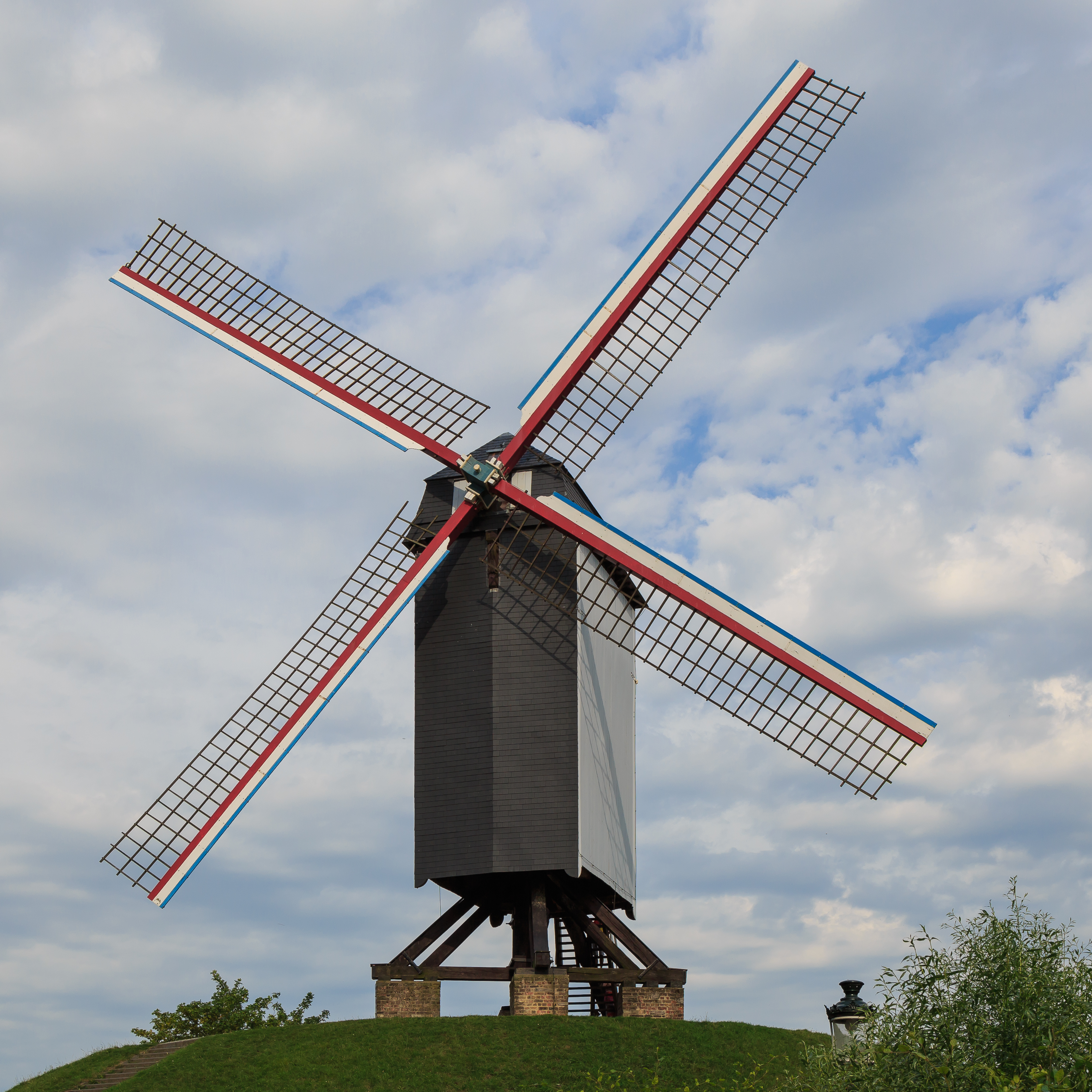
Windmills were among Abbasid inventions in technology.

Engineers in the Abbasid caliphate made a number of innovative industrial uses of hydropower, and early industrial uses of tidal power, wind power, and petroleum (notably by distillation into kerosene). The industrial uses of watermills in the Islamic world date back to the 7th century, while horizontal-wheeled and vertical-wheeled water mills were both in widespread use since at least the 9th century. By the time of the Crusades, every province throughout the Islamic world had mills in operation, from al-Andalus and North Africa to the Middle East and Central Asia. These mills performed a variety of agricultural and industrial tasks. Abbasid engineers also developed machines (such as pumps) incorporating crankshafts, employed gears in mills and water-raising machines, and used dams to provide additional power to watermills and water-raising machines. Such advances made it possible for many industrial tasks that were previously driven by manual labour in ancient times to be mechanized and driven by machinery instead in the medieval Islamic world. It has been argued that the industrial use of waterpower had spread from Islamic to Christian Spain, where fulling mills, paper mills, and forge mills were recorded for the first time in Catalonia.

A number of industries were generated during the Arab Agricultural Revolution, including early industries for textiles, sugar, rope-making, matting, silk, and paper. Latin translations of the 12th century passed on knowledge of chemistry and instrument making in particular. The agricultural and handicraft industries also experienced high levels of growth during this period.

== Society ==
=== Arabization ===
While the Abbasids originally gained power by exploiting the social inequalities against non-Arabs in the Umayyad Empire, during Abbasid rule the empire rapidly Arabized, particularly in the Fertile Crescent region (namely Mesopotamia and the Levant) as had begun under Umayyad rule. As knowledge was shared in the Arabic language throughout the empire, many people from different nationalities and religions began to speak Arabic in their everyday lives. Resources from other languages began to be translated into Arabic, and a unique Islamic identity began to form that fused previous cultures with Arab culture, creating a level of civilization and knowledge that was considered a marvel in Europe at the time.

=== Status of women ===
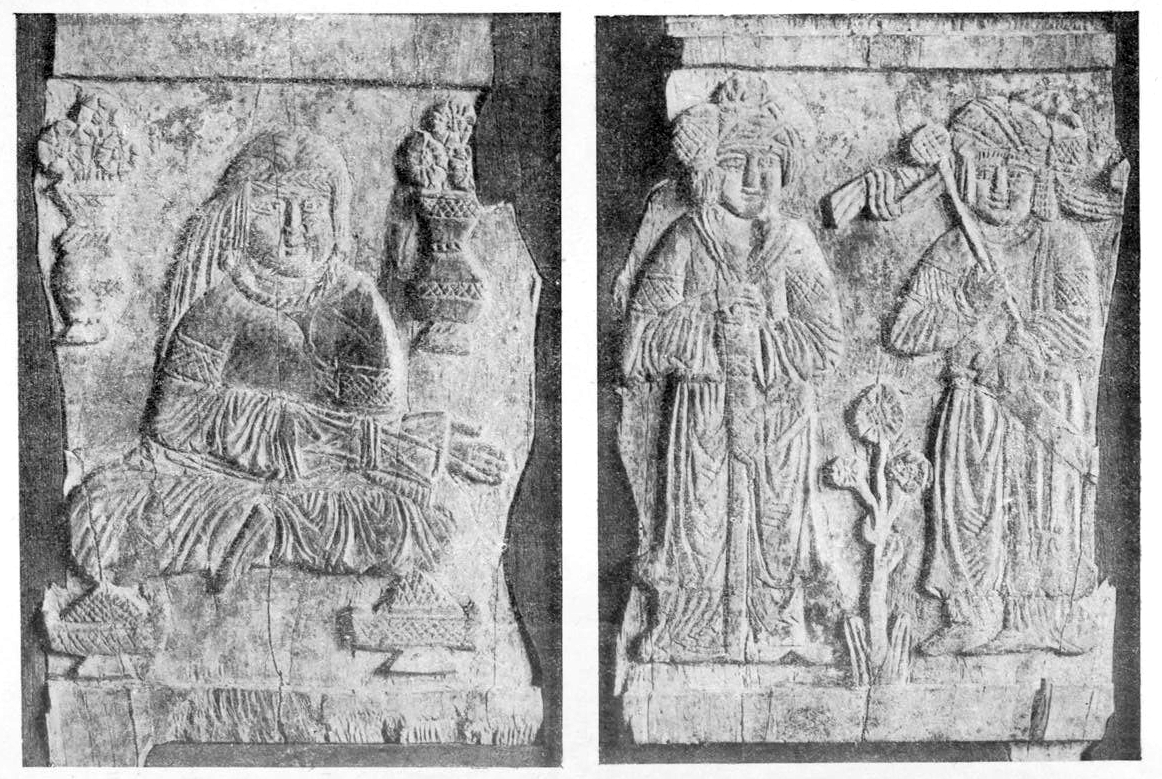
Abbasid ivory plaque, Iran or Irak, 12th century, Louvre Museum

In contrast to the earlier era, women in Abbasid society were absent from all arenas of the community's central affairs. While their Muslim forebears led men into battle, started rebellions, and played an active role in community life, as demonstrated in the Hadith literature, Abbasid women were ideally kept in seclusion. Conquests had brought enormous wealth and large numbers of slaves to the Muslim elite. The majority of the slaves were women and children, many of whom had been dependents or harem-members of the defeated Sassanian upper classes. In the wake of the conquests an elite man could potentially own a thousand slaves, and ordinary soldiers could have ten people serving them. (Note: Concubines were expected to be treated well, treating them poorly would have been deviation from Islamic ethics however some from the ruling class engaged in acts of disbelief and deviancy behind closed doors with and without their harem's)

It was narrated from Ibn Abbas that Muhammad said:

There is no man whose two daughters reach the age of puberty and he treats them kindly for the time they are together, but they will gain him admittance to Paradise.

Whoever has three daughters and is patient towards them, and feeds them, gives them to drink, and clothes them from his wealth; they will be a shield for him from the Fire on the Day of Resurrection.

Some slave courtesans (qiyans and jawaris) and princesses produced prestigious and important poetry. Surviving poetry reveals important female figures in the Abbasid world, such as the Sufi mystic Raabi'a al-Adwiyya (714–801 CE), the princess and poet Ulayya bint al-Mahdi (777–825 CE), and the singing-girls Shāriyah (c. 815 – c. 870 CE), Fadl al-Sha'irah (d. 871 CE) and Arib al-Ma'muniyya (797–890 CE).

Each wife in the Abbasid harem had an additional home or flat, with her own enslaved staff of eunuchs and maidservants. When a concubine gave birth to a son, she was elevated in rank to umm walad and also received apartments and (slave) servants as a gift.

=== Treatment of Jews and Christians ===
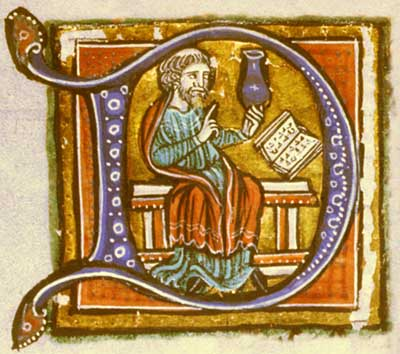
Hunayn ibn Ishaq was an influential translator, scholar, physician, and scientist.

The status and treatment of Jews, Christians, and non-Muslims in the Abbasid Caliphate was a complex and continually changing issue. Non-Muslims were called dhimmis. Dhimmis faced some level of discrimination in Abbasid society: they did not have all the privileges of Muslims and had to pay jizya, a tax on non-Muslims. However, as people of the book (non-Muslim monotheists), Jews and Christians were allowed to practice their religion and were not required to convert.

At the level of family and household life, in the multiconfessional society of the early Islamic empire, particularly in Iraq, and also in Syria and western Iran, Syriac Christian sources show that Christian communities developed distinctive responses to shared social norms around marriage and family life under Abbasid rule. Ecclesiastical authorities discouraged practices such as polygamy and sought to regulate interreligious unions, yet ordinary Christians in Iraq and neighboring regions nonetheless participated in both Christian and Islamic marital practices and households across confessional lines. Christian men might take multiple wives or marry non-Christians, and interreligious marriages, especially those involving Muslim husbands and Christian women, were a persistent concern for Christian jurists, who viewed them as threatening communal boundaries.

One of the common aspects of the treatment of the dhimmis is that their treatment depended on who the caliph was at the time. Some Abbasid rulers, like Al-Mutawakkil (822–861 CE) imposed strict restrictions on what dhimmis could wear in public, often yellow garments that distinguished them from Muslims. Other restrictions al-Mutawakkil imposed included limiting the role of the dhimmis in government, seizing dhimmi housing and making it harder for dhimmis to become educated. Most other Abbasid caliphs were not as strict as al-Mutawakkil. During the reign of Al-Mansur (754–775 CE), it was common for Jews and Christians to influence the overall culture in the caliphate, specifically in Baghdad. Jews and Christians did this by participating in scholarly work.

It was common that laws that were imposed against dhimmis during one caliph's rule were either discarded or not practiced during future caliphs' reigns. Al-Mansur and al-Mutawakkil both instituted laws that forbade non-Muslims from participating in public office. Al-Mansur did not follow his own law very closely, bringing dhimmis back to the caliphate's treasury due to the needed expertise of dhimmis in the area of finance. Al-Mutawakkil followed the law banning dhimmis from public office more seriously, although, soon after his reign, many of the laws concerning dhimmis participating in government were completely unobserved or at least less strictly observed. Even Al-Muqtadir (r. 908–932 CE), who held a similar stance as al-Mutawakkil on barring non-Muslims from public office, himself had multiple Christian secretaries, indicating that non-Muslims still had access to many of the most important figures within the caliphate. Past having a casual association or just being a secretary to high-ranking Islamic officials, some of them achieved the second highest office after the caliph: the vizier.

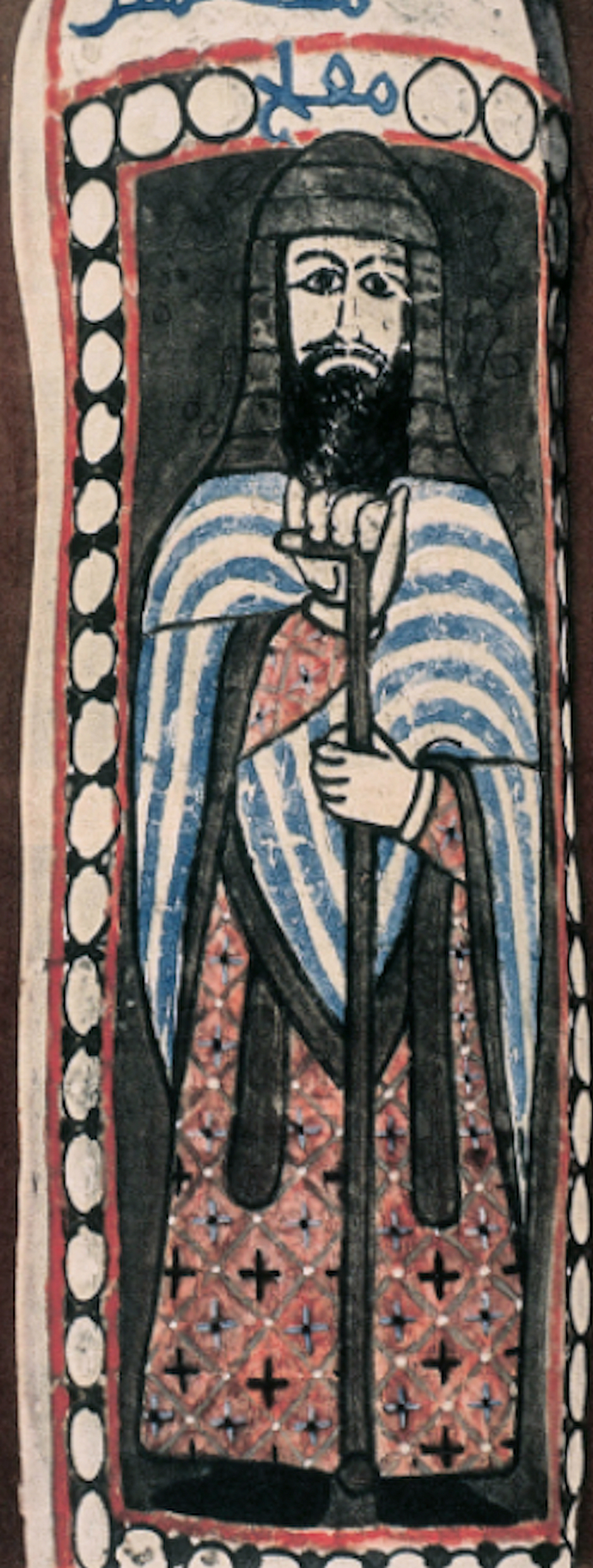
Church of the East cleric. Mural from the Palace of al-Mukhtar, dated 837–839 CE, Samarra, Iraq.

Jews and Christians may have had a lower overall status compared to Muslims in the Abbasid Caliphate, but dhimmis were often allowed to hold respectable and even prestigious occupations in some cases, such as doctors and public officeholders. Jews and Christians were also allowed to be rich even if they were taxed for being a dhimmi. Dhimmis were capable of moving up and down the social ladder, though this largely depended on the particular caliph. An indication as to the social standing of Jews and Christians at the time was their ability to live next to Muslim people. While al-Mansur was ruling the caliphate, for instance, it was not uncommon for dhimmis to live in the same neighborhoods as Muslims. One of the biggest reasons why dhimmis were allowed to hold prestigious jobs and positions in government is that they were generally important to the well-being of the state and were proficient to excellent with the work at hand. Some Muslims in the caliphate took offense to the idea that there were dhimmis in public offices who were in a way ruling over them although it was an Islamic state, while other Muslims were at time jealous of some dhimmis for having a level of wealth or prestige greater than other Muslims, even if Muslims were still the majority of the ruling class. In general, Muslims, Jews, and Christians had close relations that could be considered positive at times, especially for Jews, in contrast to how Jews were being treated in Europe.

Many of the laws and restrictions that were imposed on dhimmis often resembled other laws that previous states had used to discriminate against a minority religion, specifically Jewish people. Romans in the fourth century banned Jewish people from holding public offices, banned Roman citizens from converting to Judaism, and often demoted Jews who were serving in the Roman military. In direct contrast, there was an event in which two viziers, Ibn al-Furat and Ali ibn Isa ibn al-Jarrah, argued about Ibn al-Furat's decision to make a Christian the head of the military. A previous vizier, Abu Muhammad al-Hasan al-Bazuri, had done so. These laws predated al-Mansur's laws against dhimmis and often had similar restrictions, although Roman emperors were often much more strict on enforcing these laws than many Abbasid caliphs.

Most of Baghdad's Jews were incorporated into the Arab community and considered Arabic their native language. Some Jews studied Hebrew in their schools and Jewish religious education flourished. The united Muslim empire allowed Jews to reconstruct links between their dispersed communities throughout the Middle East. The city's Talmudic institute helped spread the rabbinical tradition to Europe, and the Jewish community in Baghdad went on to establish ten rabbinical schools and twenty-three synagogues. Baghdad not only contained the tombs of Muslim saints and martyrs, but also the tomb of Yusha, whose corpse had been brought to Iraq during the first migration of the Jews out of the Levant.

=== Holidays ===
There were large feasts on certain days, as the Muslims of the empire celebrated Christian holidays as well as their own. There were two main Islamic feasts: one marked by the end of Ramadan; the other, "the Feast of Sacrifice". The former was especially joyful because children would purchase decorations and sweetmeats; people prepared the best food and bought new clothes. At midmorning, the caliph, wearing Muhammad's thobe, would guide officials, accompanied by armed soldiers to the Great Mosque, where he led prayers. After the prayer, all those in attendance would exchange the best wishes and hug their kin and companions. The festivities lasted for three days. During those limited number of nights, the palaces were lit up and boats on the Tigris hung lights. It was said that Baghdad "glittered 'like a bride'". During the Feast of Sacrifice, sheep were butchered in public arenas and the caliph participated in a large-scale sacrifice in the palace courtyard. Afterward, the meat would be divided and given to the poor.

In addition to these two holidays, Shias celebrated the birthdays of Fatima and Ali ibn Abi Talib. Matrimonies and births in the royal family were observed by all in the empire. The announcement that one of the caliph's sons could recite the Koran smoothly was greeted by communal jubilation. When Harun developed this holy talent, the people lit torches and decorated the streets with wreaths of flowers, and his father, Al-Mahdi, freed 500 slaves.

Of all the holidays imported from other cultures and religions, the one most celebrated in Baghdad (a city with many Persians) was Nowruz, which celebrated the arrival of spring. In a ceremonial ablution introduced by Persian troops, residents sprinkled themselves with water and ate almond cakes. The palaces of the imperial family were lit up for six days and nights. The Abbasids also celebrated the Persian holiday of Mihraj, which marked the onset of winter (signified with pounding drums), and Sadar, when homes burned incense and the masses would congregate along the Tigris to witness princes and viziers pass by.

== Military ==
The Abbasid army amassed an array of siege equipment, such as catapults, mangonels, battering rams, ladders, grappling irons, and hooks. All such weaponry was operated by military engineers. However, the primary siege weapon was the manjaniq, a type of siege weapon that was comparable to the trebuchet employed in Western medieval times. From the seventh century onward, it had largely replaced torsion artillery. By Harun al-Rashid's time, the Abbasid army employed fire grenades. The Abbasids also utilized field hospitals and ambulances drawn by camels. The cavalry was entirely covered in iron, with helmets. Similar to medieval knights, their only exposed spots were the end of their noses and small openings in front of their eyes. Their foot soldiers were issued spears, swords, and pikes, and (in line with Persian fashion) trained to stand so solidly that, one contemporary wrote "you would have thought them held fast by clamps of bronze". Although the Abbasids never retained a substantial regular army, the caliph could recruit a considerable number of soldiers in a short time when needed from levies. There were also cohorts of regular troops who received steady pay and a special forces unit. At any moment, 125,000 Muslim soldiers could be assembled along the Byzantine frontier, Baghdad, Medina, Damascus, Rayy, and other geostrategic locations in order to quell any unrest.

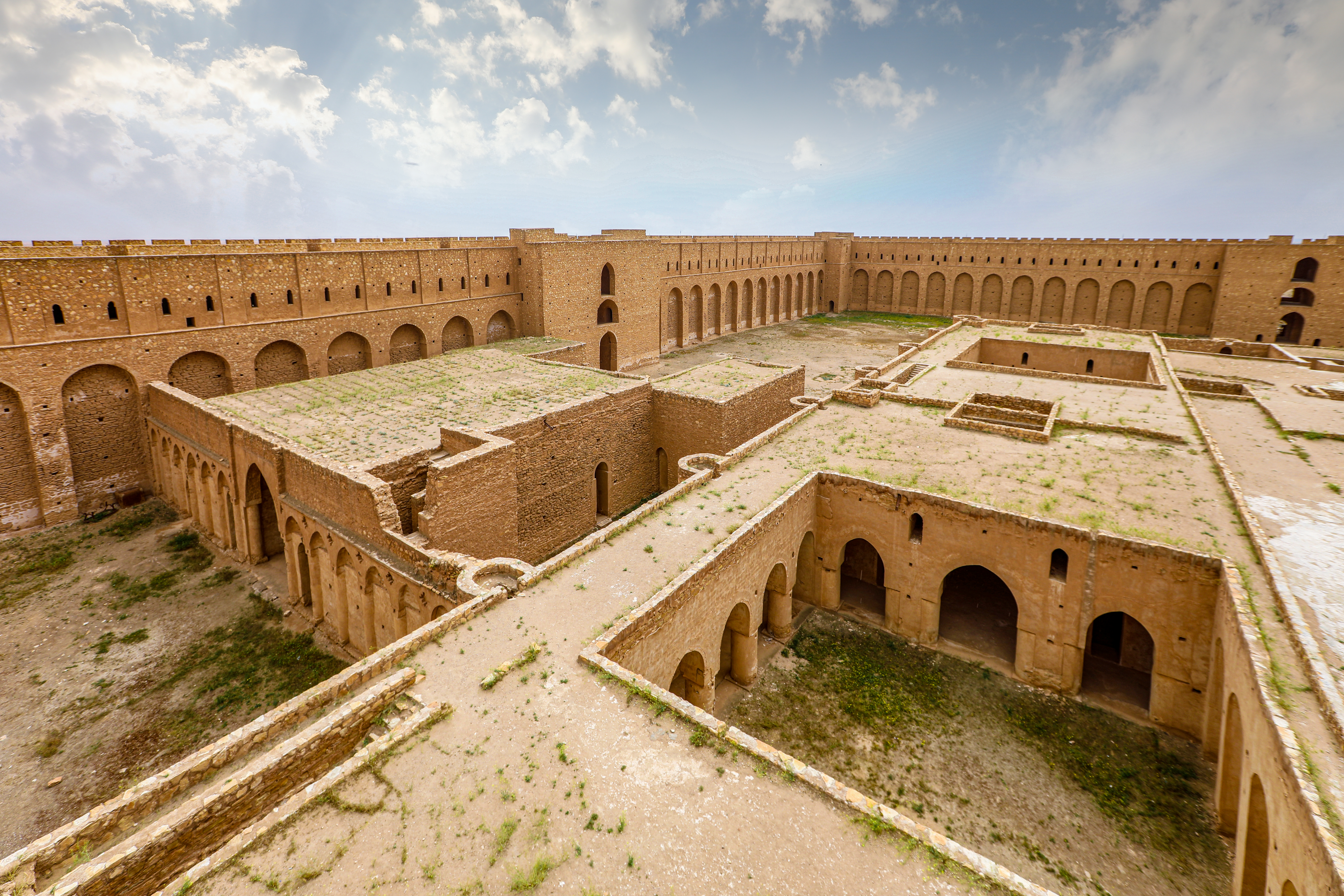
Al-Ukhaidir Fortress, located south of Karbala, is a large, rectangular fortress erected in 775 CE with a unique defensive style.

During the Abbasid revolution, Abu Muslim's Khurasani army, composed largely of Arab settlers disillusioned with Umayyad rule, marched under black banners, forming a powerful force that swept westward in open revolt. In Baghdad there were many Abbasid military leaders who were or said they were of Arab descent. However, it is clear that most of the ranks were of Iranian origin, the vast majority being from Khurasan and Transoxiana, not from western Iran or Azerbaijan. Most of the Khurasani soldiers who brought the Abbasids to power were Arabs. The standing army of the Muslims in Khurasan was overwhelmingly Arab. The unit organization of the Abbasids was designed with the goal of ethnic and racial equality among supporters. When Abu Muslim recruited officers along the Silk Road, he registered them based not on their tribal or ethno-national affiliations but on their current places of residence. Under the Abbasids, Iranian peoples became better represented in the army and bureaucracy as compared to before. The Abbasid army was centred on the Abna al-dawla infantry and the Khurasaniyya heavy cavalry, led by their own semi-autonomous commanders (qa'id) who recruited and deployed their own men with Abbasid resource grants. al-Mu'tasim began the practice of recruiting Turkic slave soldiers from the Samanids into a private army, which allowed him to take over the reins of the caliphate. He abolished the old jund system created by Umar and diverted the salaries of the original Arab military descendants to the Turkic slave soldiers. The Turkic soldiers transformed the style of warfare, as they were known as capable horse archers, trained from childhood to ride. This military was now drafted from the ethnic groups of the faraway borderlands, and were completely separate from the rest of society. Some could not speak Arabic properly. This led to the decline of the caliphate starting with the Anarchy at Samarra.

== Civil administration ==
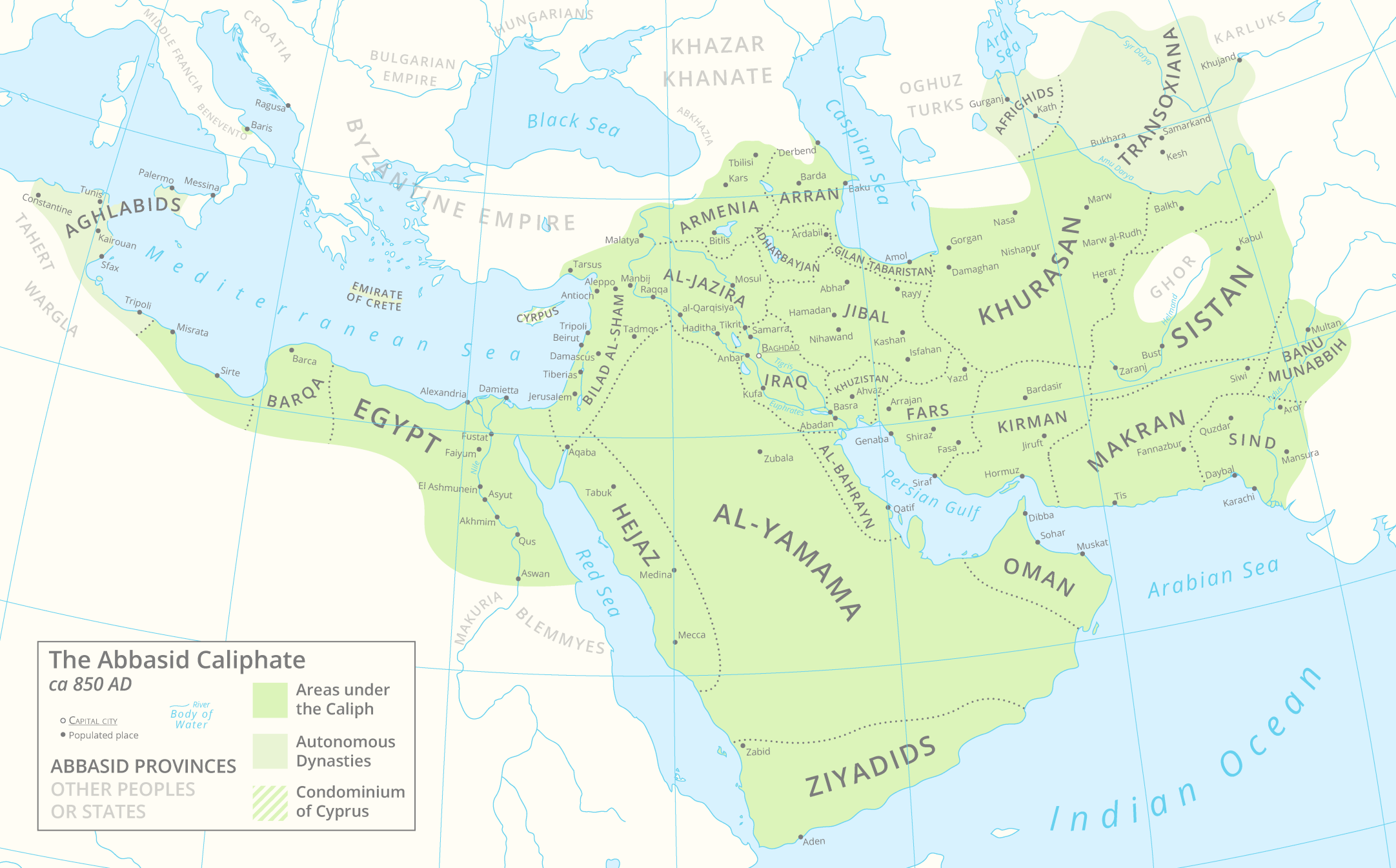
The provinces of Abbasid Caliphate in c. 850 under al-Mutawakkil

As a result of such a vast Empire, the caliphate was decentralized and divided into 24 provinces.

Harun's vizier enjoyed close to unchecked powers. Under Harun, a special "bureau of confiscation" was created. This governmental wing made it possible for the vizier to seize the property and riches of any corrupt governor or civil servant. In addition, it allowed governors to confiscate the estates of lower-ranking officials. Finally, the caliph could impose the same penalty on a vizier who fell from grace. As one later caliph put it: "The vizier is our representative throughout the land and amongst our subjects. Therefore, he who obeys him obeys us; and he who obeys us obeys God, and God shall cause him who obeys Him to enter paradise."

Every regional metropolis had a post office and hundreds of roads were paved in order to link the imperial capital with other cities and towns. The empire employed a system of relays to deliver mail. The central post office in Baghdad even had a map with directions that noted the distances between each town. The roads were provided with roadside inns, hospices, and wells and could reach eastward through Persia and Central Asia, to as far as China. The post office not only enhanced civil services but also served as intelligence for the caliph. Mailmen were employed as spies who kept an eye on local affairs.

Early in the days of the caliphate, the Barmakids took the responsibility of shaping the civil service. The family had roots in a Buddhist monastery in northern Afghanistan. In the early 8th century, the family converted to Islam and began to take on a sizable part of the civil administration for the Abbasids.

Capital poured into the caliphate's treasury from a variety of taxes, including a real estate tax; a levy on cattle, gold and silver, and commercial wares; a special tax on non-Muslims; and customs dues.

== Trade ==
Under Harun al-Rashid, maritime trade through the Persian Gulf thrived, with Arab vessels trading as far south as Madagascar and as far east as China, Korea, and Japan. The growing economy of Baghdad and other cities inevitably led to the demand for luxury items and formed a class of entrepreneurs who organized long-range caravans for the trade and then the distribution of their goods. A whole section in the East Baghdad suq was dedicated to Chinese goods.

Much of this direct maritime trade was oriented toward Iraqi markets, particularly Basra and Baghdad, which functioned as major destinations for goods arriving from Tang China. From the seventh to the tenth centuries, merchants from the Gulf served Iraqi markets through direct sea routes linking the Persian Gulf to the South China coast, especially Guangzhou, as attested by both contemporary textual sources and archaeological evidence. The ninth-century Belitung shipwreck, carrying a large cargo of Chinese ceramics, illustrates the scale of this trade and its connection to demand in Iraq and the wider Abbasid realm.

Arabs traded with the Baltic region and made it as far north as the British Isles. Tens of thousands of Arab coins have been discovered in parts of Russia and Sweden, which bear witness to the comprehensive trade networks set up by the Abbasids. King Offa of Mercia (in England) minted gold coins similar to those of the Abbasids in the eighth century.

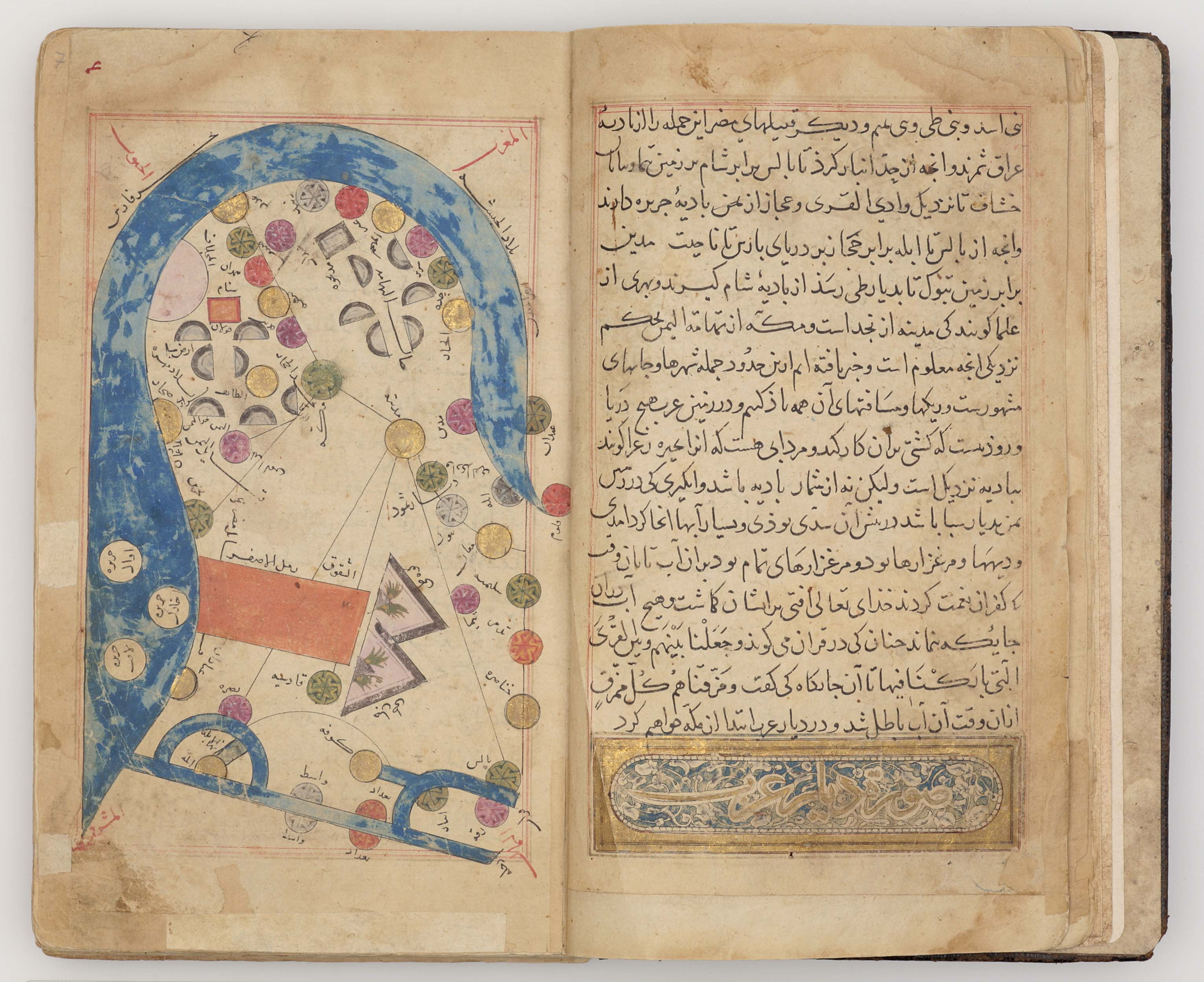
Book of Roads and Kingdoms written by Istakhri

Muslim merchants employed ports in Bandar Siraf, Basra, and Aden and some Red Sea ports to travel and trade with India and South East Asia. Land routes were also utilized through Central Asia. Arab businessmen were present in China as early as the eighth century. Arab merchants sailed the Caspian Sea to reach and trade with Bukhara and Samarkand.

During the ninth and tenth centuries, large quantities of opaque glazed pottery were produced in southern Iraq, within the heartlands of the Abbasid Caliphate, and exported as a mass-produced commercial commodity. Finds of this Iraqi ware at sites across the Middle East, South Africa, and Southeast Asia demonstrate sustained commercial interaction between Iraq and the wider Indian Ocean world. Most of the exported vessels were standardized and practical in design, indicating that they were produced for large-scale commercial trade rather than for elite or luxury use.

Many caravans and goods never made it to their intended destinations. Some Chinese exports perished in fires, while other ships sank. It was said that anybody who made it to China and back unharmed was blessed by God. Common sea routes were also plagued by pirates who built and crewed vessels that were faster than most merchant ships. It is said that many of the adventures at sea in the Sinbad tales were based on historical fiction of mariners of the day.

The Abbasids also established overland trade with Africa, largely for gold and slaves. When trade with Europe ceased due to hostilities, Jews served as a link between the two hostile worlds.

== See also ==
- Political history of the world
- Iranian Intermezzo
- List of largest empires
- List of Sunni dynasties
- Journal of Abbasid Studies

— Imperial house — Abbasid dynasty Cadet branch of the Banu Hashim
Preceded by Umayyad dynasty	Caliphate dynasty 750–1258 and 1261–1517 also claimed by Fatimid dynasty in 909, Umayyad dynasty in 929, and Ottoman dynasty	Succeeded by Ottoman dynasty
