= List of Abbasid caliphs =

Caliphs of the Abbasid Caliphate

Details
- First monarch: al-Saffah
- Last monarch: al-Musta'sim al-Mutawakkil III (Cairo)
- Formed: 750
- Abolished: 1258; 1517 (Cairo)
- Residences: Kufa (750–762); Baghdad (762–836, 892–1258); Samarra (836–892); Cairo (1261–1517)

The Abbasid caliphs were the holders of the Islamic title of caliph who were members of the Abbasid dynasty, a branch of the Quraysh tribe descended from the uncle of the Islamic prophet Muhammad, Abbas ibn Abd al-Muttalib.

== Abbasid caliphs (750–1258) ==
The Abbasids came to power overthrowing Umayyad dynasty in the Abbasid Revolution. As caliphs, they held both temporal and religious suzerainty over Muslim lands. After a golden age and a temporary revival, their decline accelerated the fragmentation of the Muslim world into autonomous states. Their religious authority was also challenged by the Shi'a Fatimid Caliphate (909–1171) and the Caliphate of Córdoba (929–1031). The caliphs lost their temporal power completely in mid-tenth century; first to a series of military strongmen, then to the Shi'a Buyid Emirs, which were in turn replaced by the Sunni Seljuk Turks. Their independence from the Seljuks was short-lived, as the dynasty ended with the Mongol Sack of Baghdad in 1258.

No.	Coin (Note: Only the side bearing the caliph's name (usually reverse, observe for last caliphs) is shown.)	Name (Note: Abbasids began the tradition of using theologically loaded laqabs as regnal honorifics, which was also adopted by later rival caliphates of Fatimids, Almohads, and Umayyads of Cordoba. In both Western and Islamic historiography, the caliphs are referred to by these regnal titles.)	Reign	Parents (Note: Most Abbasid caliphs were born to a concubine mother, known as umm al-walad (Arabic: أم الولد, lit. 'mother of the child'). The term refers to a slave woman who had a child from her owner; they could not be sold by their owner and the children born were considered legitimate, legally free and with full rights of inheritance. These concubines mostly were Abyssinians, Armenians, Berbers, Byzantine Greeks, Turkic or even from Sicily.)	Life details
Consolidation and Golden Age (750–861)
1		al-Saffah أبو العباس عبدالله السفّاح بن محمد; Abū’l-ʿAbbās ʿAbd Allāh as-Saffāḥ ibn Muḥammad	750 – 8 June 754 (~4 years)	Muhammad ibn Ali; Rayta bint Ubaydallah	721 – 8 June 754 (aged 33): Great-great-grandson of Muhammad's uncle, al-Abbas.; Proclaimed caliph after Abbasid victory over Umayyad caliph Marwan II.; Battle of Talas (751).
2		al-Mansur أبو جعفر عبد الله المنصور بن محمد; Abū Jaʿfar ʿAbd Allāh al-Manṣūr ibn Muḥammad	10 June 754 – October 775 (~21 years)	Muhammad ibn Ali; Sallamah, Berber concubine	714 – October 775 (aged 61): Heir of his brother al-Saffah.; Execution of Abu Muslim (755).; Founded Baghdad as the capital (762).; Emirate of Córdoba founded by Abd al-Rahman I (756).
3		al-Mahdi أبو عبد الله محمد المهدي بن المنصور; Abū ʿAbd Allāh Muḥammad al-Mahdī ibn al-Manṣūr	October 775 – August 785 (~10 years)	al-Mansur; Arwa bint Mansur al-Himyari	744/745 – August 785 (aged 40–41): Heir of his father al-Mansur.; Invasions of Byzantium (779).
4		al-Hadi أبو محمد موسى الهادي بن المهدي; Abū Muḥammad Mūsā al-Hādī ibn al-Mahdī	August 785 – 14 September 786 (~1 year)	al-Mahdi; al-Khayzuran bint Atta	759 / 762 – 14 September 786 (aged 24–27): Heir of his father al-Mahdi.; Failed Alid revolt (786) due to resumed persecution.; Tried to replace his brother al-Rashid with his own son as heir.; Possibly poisoned by his mother, who favored al-Rashid.
5		al-Rashid أبو جعفر هارون الرشيد بن المهدي; Abū Jaʿfar Hārūn al-Rashīd ibn al-Mahdī	14 September 786 – 24 March 809 (~23 years)	al-Mahdi; al-Khayzuran bint Atta	March 763 / February 766 – 24 March 809 (aged 43–46): Named second heir by al-Mahdi.; Established Baghdad's House of Wisdom.; Invasion of Byzantium; sack of Herakleia (806).
6		al-Amin أبو موسى محمد الأمين بن هارون; Abū Mūsā Muḥammad al-Amīn ibn Hārūn	24 March 809 – 25 September 813 (~4 years)	al-Rashid; Zubaidah bint Ja'far ibn al-Mansur	April 787 – 25 September 813 (aged 26): Named first heir by his father.; Removed his half-brother al-Ma'mun as heir after he removed al-Amin's name from coins, starting Fourth Fitna.; Executed after al-Ma'mun's capture of Baghdad.
7		al-Ma'mun أبو العباس عبد الله المأمون بن هارون; Abū'l-ʿAbbās ʿAbd Allāh al-Maʾmūn ibn Hārūn	25 September 813 – 9 August 833 (~20 years)	al-Rashid; Marajil, Persian concubine	14 September 786 – 9 August 833 (aged 46): Named second heir and ruler of Khorasan by his father.; Defeated and killed al-Amin.; Height of the translation movement.; Crete conquered by exiled Andalusian pirates (824/827).; Aghlabid conquest of Sicily (827).; Mihna launched (833); official support for Mu'tazilism begins.
–		Ibrahim إبراهيم المبارك بن المهدي; Ibrāhīm al-Mubārak ibn al-Mahdī	20 July 817 – 819 (~2 years)	al-Mahdi; Shakla, Abyssinian concubine	779 – 839 (aged 60): Proclaimed caliph by people of Baghdad during the Fourth Fitna against al-Ma'mun; resigned and submitted to him.
8		al-Mu'tasim أبو إسحاق محمد بن هارون المعتصم بالله; Abū Isḥāq Muḥammad ibn Hārūn al-Muʿtaṣim bi-'llāh	9 August 833 – 5 January 842 (~9 years)	al-Rashid; Maridah, Turkic concubine	October 796 – 5 January 842 (aged 45): Allegedly named heir by his brother al-Ma'mun on his deathbed.; Establishment and rise of Turkic ghilman as a powerful military and political force.; Samarra founded as new capital (836).; Invasion of Byzantium; sack of Amorium (838).
9		al-Wathiq أبو جعفر هارون بن المعتصم الواثق بالله; Abū Jaʿfar Hārūn ibn al-Muʿtaṣim al-Wāthiq bi-'llāh	5 January 842 – 10 August 847 (~5 years)	al-Mu'tasim; Qaratis, Greek concubine	18 April 812 – 10 August 847 (aged 35): Heir of his father, al-Musta'sim.; Died from dropsy while in an oven in an attempt to cure it.
10		al-Mutawakkil أبو الفضل جعفر بن المعتصم المتوكل على الله; Abū'l-Faḍl Jaʿfar ibn al-Muʿtaṣim al-Mutawakkil ʿalā 'llāh	10 August 847 – 11 December 861 (~14 years)	al-Mu'tasim; Shuja, Khwarazmian concubine	31 March 822 – 11 December 861 (aged 39): Chosen by officials after the unexpected death of al-Wathiq.; Mihna abolished (851); official support for Mu'tazilism ends.; Assassinated by the Turkic generals due to his attempts at curbing their influence.
Anarchy at Samarra (861–870)
11		al-Muntasir أبو جعفر محمد بن المتوكل المنتصر بالله; Abū Jaʿfar Muḥammad ibn al-Mutawakkil al-Muntaṣir bi-'llāh	11 December 861 – 7 June 862 (~1 year)	al-Mutawakkil; Hubshiya, Greek concubine	November 837 – 7 June 862 (aged 24): Heir of al-Mutawakkil, whom he had assassinated.; Died of unknown causes; possibly poisoned.
12		al-Musta'in أبو العباس أحمد بن محمد المستعين بالله; Abū al-ʿAbbās Aḥmad ibn Muḥammad al-Mustaʿīn bi-ʾllāh	8 June 862 – 24 January 866 (~4 years)	Muhammad ibn al-Mu'tasim; Makhariq, Sicilian concubine	836 – 17 October 866 (aged 30): Cousin of al-Muntasir; installed by Turkic troops.; Alienated Turkic soldiers, who instead proclaimed al-Mu'tazz caliph.; Defeated in Fifth Fitna; forced to abdicate.; Assassinated by al-Mu'tazz.
13		al-Mu'tazz أبو عبد الله محمد بن المتوكل المعتز بالله; Abū ʿAbd Allāh Muḥammad ibn al-Mutawakkil al-Muʿtazz bi-ʾllāh	25 January 866 – 13 July 869 (~3 years)	al-Mutawakkil; Qabiha, Greek concubine	847 – 16 July 869 (aged 22): Second heir of al-Mutawakkil; bypassed when Turkic military installed his cousin al-Musta'in.; Installed by disgruntled Turkic troops; overthrew al-Musta'in.; Rise of Saffarids in Sistan and Tulunids in Egypt.; Deposed and imprisoned by Turkic generals; died three days later.
14		al-Muhtadi أبو إسحاق محمد بن الواثق المهتدي بالله; Abū Isḥāq Muḥammad ibn al-Wāthiq al-Muhtadī bi-'llāh	22 July 869 – 21 June 870 (~1 year)	al-Wathiq; Qurb, Greek concubine	833 – 21 June 870 (aged 37): Cousin of al-Mu'tazz; installed by Turkic military.; Sought to emulate caliph Umar II.; Killed by Turkic general Musa ibn Bugha after refusing to abdicate.
First revival (870–908)
15		al-Mu'tamid أبو العباس أحمد بن المتوكل المعتمد على الله; Abū'l-ʿAbbās Aḥmad ibn al-Mutawakkil al-Muʿtamid ʿalā ’llāh	21 June 870 – 14 October 892 (~22 years)	al-Mutawakkil; Fityan, Greek concubine	842 – 14 October 892 (aged 50): Installed by Turkic troops; de facto rule by his brother al-Muwaffaq and then his nephew al-Mu'tadid, who led the military.; Failed Saffarid invasion (876); suppression of Zanj Revolt (883).; Unification of Samanid state in Transoxiana (892).; Placed under house arrest after a failed escape attempt to Tulunid Egypt (882).
16		al-Mu'tadid أبو العباس أحمد بن الموفق المعتضد بالله; Abū'l-ʿAbbās Aḥmad ibn al-Muwaffaq al-Muʿtaḍid bi-'llāh	15 October 892 – 5 April 902 (~10 years)	al-Muwaffaq; Dirar, Greek concubine	864 / 861 – 5 April 902 (aged 38–41): al-Mu'tamid's nephew; removed his cousin from line of succession to become heir apparent.; Recovery of Jazira from Kharijite rebels (896).; Return of capital to Baghdad (892).; Qarmatian state founded in Bahrain (899).
17		al-Muktafi أبو محمد علي بن المعتضد المكتفي بالله; Abū Muḥammad ʿAlī ibn al-Muʿtaḍid al-Muktafī bi-'llāh	5 April 902 – 13 August 908 (~6 years)	al-Mu'tadid; Jijak, Turkic concubine	877 / 888 – 13 August 908 (aged 20–31): Heir apparent of al-Mu'tadid.; Recovery of Egypt from Tulunids (905).
Political fragmentation (908–945)
–		Ibn al-Mu'tazz عبد الله بن المعتز ʿAbd Allāh ibn al-Muʿtazz	17 December 908 – 18 December 908 (~1 day)	al-Mu'tazz; Fatima bint al-Fath	861 – 29 December 908 (aged 47): Proclaimed caliph by his supporters after al-Muktafi's death; overthrown and killed by al-Muqtadir's supporters.
18		al-Muqtadir أبو الفضل جعفر بن المعتضد المقتدر بالله; Abū'l-Faḍl Jaʿfar ibn al-Muʿtaḍid al-Muqtadir bi-'llāh	13 August 908 – 28 February 929 (~21 years)	al-Mu'tadid; Shaghab, Greek concubine	13 November 895 – 31 October 932 (aged 36): Installed by viziers as child puppet.; Fatimid caliphate founded in Ifriqiya (909).; Caliphal title claimed by Umayyads of Córdoba (929).; Deposed by Mu'nis al-Muzaffar.
19		al-Qahir أبو المنصور محمد بن المعتضد القاهر بالله; Abū al-Manṣūr Muḥammad ibn al-Muʿtaḍid al-Qāhir bi-'llāh	1 March 929 – 2 March 929 (~1 day)	al-Mu'tadid; Fitnah, Berber concubine	899 – 950 (aged 51): Brother of al-Muqtadir; installed and soon removed by Mu'nis.
(18)		al-Muqtadir أبو الفضل جعفر بن المعتضد المقتدر بالله; Abū'l-Faḍl Jaʿfar ibn al-Muʿtaḍid al-Muqtadir bi-'llāh	2 March 929 – 31 October 932 (~3 years)	al-Mu'tadid; Shaghab, Greek concubine	13 November 895 – 31 October 932 (aged 36): Reinstalled by Mu'nis al-Muzaffar.; Qarmatian sack of Mecca (930).; Killed in battle against Mu'nis.
(19)		al-Qahir أبو المنصور محمد بن المعتضد القاهر بالله; Abū al-Manṣūr Muḥammad ibn al-Muʿtaḍid al-Qāhir bi-'llāh	31 October 932 – 24 April 934 (~2 years)	al-Mu'tadid; Fitnah, Berber concubine	899 – 950 (aged 51): Installed by Mu'nis, whom he executed later (833).; Deposed, blinded and imprisoned by Ibn Muqla after refusing to abdicate.; Eventually freed by al-Mustakfi; spent rest of his life as a beggar.
20		al-Radi أبو العباس أحمد بن المقتدر الراضي بالله; Abū'l-ʿAbbās Aḥmad ibn al-Muqtadir al-Rāḍī bi-'llāh	24 April 934 – 13 December 940 (~6 years)	al-Muqtadir; Zalum, Greek concubine	20 December 909 – 13 December 940 (aged 30): Nephew of al-Qahir, who had him imprisoned; installed after his deposition.; Ikhshidid control of Egypt (935).; Office of amīr al-umarāʾ created, who became the de facto rulers.
21		al-Muttaqi أبو إسحاق إبراهيم بن المقتدر المتقي لله; Abū Isḥāq Ibrāhīm ibn al-Muqtadir al-Muttaqī li-'llāh	15 December 940 – 26 August 944 (~4 years)	al-Muqtadir; Khalub, Greek concubine	908 – July 968 (aged 60): Brother of al-Radi; installed by amir al-umara Bajkam.; Deposed and blinded by amir al-umara Tuzun.
22		al-Mustakfi أبو القاسم عبد الله بن المكتفي المستكفي بالله; Abū'l-Qāsim ʿAbd Allāh ibn al-Muktafī al-Mustakfī bi-ʾllāh	September 944 – 29 January 946 (~2 years)	al-Muktafi; Ghusn, Greek concubine	11 November 908 – September 949 (aged 40): Cousin of al-Muttaqi; installed by Tuzun.; Buyid takeover of Baghdad (945); Buyids named amir al-umaras.; Deposed and blinded by Mu'izz al-Dawla; died under house arrest.
Buyid control (945–1055)
23		al-Muti أبو القاسم الفضل بن المقتدر المطيع لله; Abū'l-Qāsim al-Faḍl ibn al-Muqtadir al-Muṭīʿ li-ʾllāh	29 January 946 – 5 August 974 (~28 years)	al-Muqtadir; Mash'ala, Slavic concubine	913/14 – 12 October 974 (aged 60–61): Cousin of al-Mustakfi; hid upon his enthronement; installed by Mu'izz al-Dawla after his deposition.; Egypt, Palestine and Hejaz lost to Fatimids (969).; Byzantine reconquests under Nikephoros II; fall of Antioch (969).; Forced to abdicate by Turkic general Sabuktakin; died two months later.
24		al-Ta'i أبو بكر عبد الكريم بن المطيع الطائع لأمر الله; Abū Bakr ʿAbd al-Karīm ibn al-Muṭīʿ al-Ṭāʾiʿ li-amri ʿllāh	5 August 974 – 22 November 991 (~17 years)	al-Muti; Utb, Greek concubine	929 – 3 August 1003 (aged 74): Installed by Sabuktakin.; Buyid civil wars; Byzantine reconquests continue under John I.; Deposed by Buyid emir Baha' al-Dawla; died in captivity.
25		al-Qadir أبو العباس أحمد بن إسحاق القادر بالله; Abū'l-ʿAbbās Aḥmad ibn Isḥāq al-Qādir bi-'llāh	22 November 991 – 29 November 1031 (~40 years)	Ishaq ibn al-Muqtadir; Tammani/Dimna, concubine	28 September 947 – 29 November 1031 (aged 84): Cousin of al-Ta'i; Installed by Baha' al-Dawla.; Granting of the title of Sultan as deputies to caliph, notably to Mahmud of Ghazni.; Baghdad Manifesto against Fatimids (1011).
Seljuk control (1055–1157)
26		al-Qa'im أبو جعفر عبد الله بن القادر القائم بأمر الله; Abū Jaʿfar ʿAbd Allāh ibn al-Qādir al-Qāʾim bi-amri 'llāh	29 November 1031 – 3 April 1075 (~44 years)	al-Qadir; Qatr al-Nada, Armenian concubine	8 November 1001 – 3 April 1075 (aged 73): Son and heir of al-Qadir.; End of the Caliphate of Córdoba (1031).; Buyids ousted from Baghdad by Seljuk Sultan Tughril (1055).; Recognition of Abbasid nominal authority by Almoravids (1062).; End of the Qarmatian state (1067).; Battle of Manzikert (1071); Turkic settlement in Anatolia begins.
27		al-Muqtadi أبو القاسم عبد الله بن محمد المقتدي بأمر الله; Abū'l-Qāsim ʿAbd Allāh ibn Muḥammad al-Muqtadī bi-amri ’llāh	3 April 1075 – 3 February 1094 (~19 years)	Muhammad ibn al-Qa'im; Urjuwuan, Armenian concubine	24 July 1056 – 3 February 1094 (aged 37): Grandson and heir of al-Qa'im.; Recognition of Abbasid authority in Hejaz.
28		al-Mustazhir أبو العباس أحمد بن المقتدي المستظهر بالله; Abū l-ʿAbbās Aḥmad ibn al-Muqtadī al-Mustaẓhir bi-'llāh	3 February 1094 – 6 August 1118 (~24 years)	al-Muqtadi; Tayf al-Khayal, Turkic concubine	April / May 1078 – 6 August 1118 (aged 40): First Crusade; fall of Jerusalem (1099).
29		al-Mustarshid أبو المنصور الفضل بن المستظهر المسترشد بالله; Abū'l-Manṣūr al-Faḍl ibn al-Mustaẓhir al-Mustarshid bi-'llāh	6 August 1118 – 29 August 1135 (~17 years)	al-Mustazhir; Lubaba, Slavic concubine	April / May 1092 – 29 August 1135 (aged 43): Almohad consolidation of the Maghreb (1147) and al-Andalus (1173).; Failed campaign against Seljuks (1135).; Murdered, possibly by the assassins.
30		al-Rashid أبو جعفر المنصور بن المسترشد الراشد بالله; Abū Jaʿfar al-Manṣūr ibn al-Mustarshid al-Rāshid bi-'llāh	29 August 1135 – 17 August 1136 (~1 year)	al-Mustarshid; Khushf, Iraqi concubine	1109 – 6 June 1138 (aged 29): Deposed by Seljuk Sultan Mas'ud.; Fled to Isfahan; killed by assassins.
31		al-Muqtafi أبو عبد الله محمد بن المسترشد المقتفي لأمر الله; Abū ʿAbd Allāh Muḥammad ibn al-Mustarshid al-Muqtafī li-ʾamri ’llāh	17 September 1136 – 12 March 1160 (~24 years)	al-Mustazhir; Ashin, Syrian concubine	9 April 1096 – 12 March 1160 (aged 63): Uncle of al-Rashid; installed by Mas'ud.; Failed Seljuk Siege of Baghdad (1157); Abbasid control of Iraq.
Final revival (1157–1258)
32		al-Mustanjid أبو المظفر يوسف بن المقتفي المستنجد بالله; Abū'l-Muẓaffar Yūsuf ibn al-Muqtafī al-Mustanjid bi-'llāh	12 March 1160 – 18 December 1170 (~10 years)	al-Muqtafi; Thawus, Greek concubine	1124 – 18 December 1170 (aged 46): Formal independence from Seljuks; Sultan's name removed from Abbasid coinage (1165)
33		al-Mustadi أبو محمد الحسن بن المستنجد المستضي بأمر الله; Abū Muḥammad al-Ḥasan ibn al-Mustanjid al-Mustaḍīʾ bi-amri ʾllāh	18 December 1170 – 27 March 1180 (~10 years)	al-Mustanjid; Ghadha, Armenian concubine	1142 – 27 March 1180 (aged 38): End of the Fatimid Caliphate (1171); Abbasid nominal authority restored in Egypt under Saladin.
34		al-Nasir أبو العباس أحمد بن المستضي الناصر لدين الله; Abū'l-ʿAbbās Aḥmad ibn al-Mustaḍīʾ an-Nāṣir li-Dīn Allāh	27 March 1180 – 5 October 1225 (~45 years)	al-Mustadi; Zumurrud, Turkic concubine	6 August 1158 – 5 October 1225 (aged 67): Recovery of Jerusalem from the Crusaders by Saladin (1187).; End of Seljuk Empire; conquest by the Khwarazmians (1194).; Mongol conquest of Khwarazmian Empire (1221).; Longest reigning Abbasid caliph; died of dysentery.
35		al-Zahir أبو نصر محمد بن الناصر الظاهر بأمر الله; Abū Naṣr Muḥammad ibn an-Nāṣir az-Ẓāhir bi-amri’llāh	5 October 1225 – 10 July 1226 (~9 months)	al-Nasir; Asma	1175 – 10 July 1226 (aged 51): Died after a brief reign.
36		al-Mustansir أبو جعفر المنصور بن الظاهر المستنصر بالله; Abū Jaʿfar al-Manṣūr ibn az-Ẓāhir al-Mustanṣir bi-'llāh	10 July 1226 – 5 December 1242 (~16 years)	al-Zahir; Zahra, Turkic concubine	17 February 1192 – 5 December 1242 (aged 50): Almohad withdrawal from al-Andalus (1228).
37		al-Musta'sim أبو أحمد عبد الله بن المستنصر المستعصم بالله; Abū Aḥmad ʿAbd Allāh ibn al-Mustanṣir al-Mustaʿṣim bi-'llāh	5 December 1242 – 20 February 1258 (~16 years)	al-Mustansir; Hajer, Abyssinian concubine	1213 – 20 February 1258 (aged 45): Mamluk overthrow of Ayyubid dynasty (1250).; Executed after Mongol sack of Baghdad.; End of Abbasid Caliphate as a political entity.

== Abbasids caliphs of Cairo (1261–1517) ==
In 1261, the Abbasid dynasty was re-established by a cadet branch of the dynasty at Cairo under the auspices of the local Mamluk sultans, but these caliphs were purely ceremonial figures, while actual political power fully rested with the Mamluks. This revived caliphate lasted until the Ottoman conquest of Egypt in 1517, after which it even its title fizzled out with the death of last caliph, al-Mutawakkil III.

No.	Name	Reign	Parents	Life details
1	al-Mustansir أبو القاسم أحمد بن الظاهر المستنصر بالله; Abū'l-Qāsim Aḥmad ibn az-Ẓāhir al-Mustanṣir bi-llāh	13 June 1261 – 28 November 1261 (~5 months)	al-Zahir	d. 28 November 1261: Uncle of al-Musta'sim; fled to Cairo after the Battle of Ain Jalut (1260).; Proclaimed caliph by Baybars; killed in a Mongol ambush while marching to recover Baghdad.
2	al-Hakim I أبو العباس أحمد بن حسن الحاكم بأمر الله; Abū'l-ʿAbbās Aḥmad ibn Ḥasan al-Ḥākim bi-Amri'llāh	16 November 1262 – 19 January 1302 (~39 years)	al-Hasan ibn Ali ibn Abu Bakr ibn al-Mustarshid	1222/1232 – 19 January 1302 (aged 70/80): Descendant of al-Mustarshid (r. 1118–1135).; Fled to Syria after fall of Baghdad; installed by Aleppo's emir Aqush (1261).; Abdicated in al-Mustansir's favor after his troops defected to him.; Survived the Mongol ambush and fled to Cairo; proclaimed caliph by Baybars.
3	al-Mustakfi I أبو الربيع سليمان بن الحاكم المستكفي بالله; Abū ar-Rabīʿ Sulaymān ibn al-Ḥākim al-Mustakfī bi-llāh	20 January 1302 – February 1340 (~38 years)	al-Hakim I; Turkic concubine	1285 – February 1340 (aged 56): Named heir by al-Hakim I.; Exiled by al-Nasir Muhammad for supporting Baybars II (1337); Died of grief over his heir Sadaqa's death.
4	al-Wathiq I أبو إسحاق إبراهيم بن أحمد الواثق بالله; Abū Isḥāq Ibrāhīm ibn Aḥmad al-Wāthiq bi-'llāh	May 1340 – 17 June 1341 (~1 year)	Ahmad ibn al-Hakim I	d. November 1347: Nephew of al-Mustakfi I; controversially installed by al-Nasir Muhammad.; Removed and put under house arrest by al-Mansur Abu Bakr; died of plague.
5	al-Hakim II أبو العباس أحمد بن المستكفي الحاكم بأمر الله; Abū'l-ʿAbbās Aḥmad ibn al-Mustakfī al-Ḥākim bi-Amri'llāh	17 June 1341 – 1352 (~11 years)	al-Mustakfi I	d. 1352: Heir of al-Mustakfi I bypassed by al-Nasir.; Died of black death.
6	al-Mu'tadid I أبو الفتح أبو بكر بن المستكفي المعتضد بالله; Abū al-Fatḥ Abū Bakr ibn al-Mustakfī al-Muʿtaḍid bi-'llāh	28 September 1352 – March 1362 (~10 years)	al-Mustakfi I	d. March 1362: Brother of al-Hakim II; chosen by elites.
7	al-Mutawakkil I أبو عبد الله محمد بن المستكفي المتوكل على الله; Abū ʿAbd Allāh Muḥammad ibn al-Mustakfī al-Mutawakkil ʿalā'llāh	March 1362 – 11 July 1377 (~15 years)	al-Mu'tadid I	1339 – 18 January 1406 (aged 67): Named heir by his father.; Deposed by Aynabak al-Yalbughawi for refusing to sanction al-Ashraf Sha'ban's murder.
8	al-Musta'sim أبو يحيى زكريا بن الواثق المستعصم بالله; Abū Yaḥyā Zakariyyāʾ ibn al-Wāthiq al-Mustaʿṣim bi-'llāh	11 July 1377 – July 1377 (<2 weeks)	al-Wathiq I	d. 1399: Cousin of al-Mutawakkil I; installed by Aynabak.; Removed soon after amid popular pressure.
(7)	al-Mutawakkil I أبو عبد الله محمد بن المستكفي المتوكل على الله; Abū ʿAbd Allāh Muḥammad ibn al-Mustakfī al-Mutawakkil ʿalā'llāh	July 1377 – September 1383 (~6 years)	al-Mu'tadid I	1339 – 18 January 1406 (aged 67): Reinstalled by Aynabak.; Burji rule established by al-Zahir Barquq (1382).; Removed and put under house arrest by Barquq over an alleged plot against him.
9	al-Wathiq II أبو حفص عمر بن الواثق الواثق بالله; Abū Ḥafṣ ʿUmar ibn al-Wāthiq al-Wāthiq bi-'llāh	September 1383 – 13 November 1386 (~3 years)	al-Wathiq I	1316 – 13 November 1386 (aged 70): Brother of al-Musta'sim; installed by Barquq.; Died of an illness.
(8)	al-Musta'sim أبو يحيى زكريا بن الواثق المستعصم بالله; Abū Yaḥyā Zakariyyāʾ ibn al-Wāthiq al-Mustaʿṣim bi-'llāh	21 November 1386 – March 1389 (~3 years)	al-Wathiq I	d. 1399: Brother of al-Wathiq II; installed by Barquq.; Removed and put under house arrest.
(7)	al-Mutawakkil I أبو عبد الله محمد بن المستكفي المتوكل على الله; Abū ʿAbd Allāh Muḥammad ibn al-Mustakfī al-Mutawakkil ʿalā'llāh	March 1389 – 9 January 1406 (~17 years)	al-Mu'tadid I	1339 – 18 January 1406 (aged 67): Reinstalled by Barquq after a revolt.; Declined sultanate offer after Barquq's defeat (1399); recommending al-Salih Hajji's restoration.; Timur's invasions of Levant (1400); Ottoman defeat at Ankara (1402).
10	al-Musta'in أبو الفضل العباس بن المتوكل المستعين بالله; Abū al-Faḍl al-ʿAbbās ibn al-Mutawakkil al-Mustaʿīn bi-'llāh	22 January 1406 – 9 March 1414 (~8 years)	al-Mutawakkil I	1390 – 16 March 1430 (aged 40): Named heir by his father.; Elected sultan after al-Nasir Faraj's overthrow.; Dominated, forced to abdicate, later deposed as caliph, and imprisoned by al-Mu'ayyad Shaykh.; Freed by al-Zahir Tatar (1421); died of plague.
11	al-Mu'tadid II أبو الفتح داود بن المتوكل المعتضد بالله; Abū al-Fatḥ Dāwūd ibn al-Mutawakkil al-Muʿtaḍid bi-'llāh	9 March 1414 – 4 July 1441 (~27 years)	al-Mutawakkil I	d. 4 July 1441: Brother of al-Musta'in; installed by al-Mu'ayyad.
12	al-Mustakfi II أبو الربيع سليمان بن المتوكل المستكفي بالله; Abū al-Rabīʿ Sulaymān ibn al-Mutawakkil al-Mustakfī bi-llāh	4 July 1441 – 4 February 1451 (~10 years)	al-Mutawakkil I	1388 – 4 February 1451 (aged 63): Named heir by his brother, al-Mu'tadid II.; Died of an illness.
13	al-Qa'im أبو البقاء حمزة بن المتوكل القائم بأمر الله; Abū al-Baqāʾ Ḥamza ibn al-Mutawakkil al-Qāʾim bi-ʾamr Allāh	7 February 1451 – 19 June 1455 (~4 years)	al-Mutawakkil I	d. 28 August 1458: Brother of al-Mustakfi II; chosen by elites.; Supported al-Ashraf Inal's overthrow of al-Mansur Uthman (1453).; Deposed and exiled for backing a failed revolt against Inal.
14	al-Mustanjid أبو المحاسن يوسف بن المتوكل المستنجد بالله; Abū al-Maḥāsin Yūsuf ibn al-Mutawakkil al-Mustanjid bi-'llāh	19 June 1455 – 17 April 1479 (~24 years)	al-Mutawakkil I	1396 – 17 April 1479 (aged 40): Brother of al-Qa'im; installed by Inal.
15	al-Mutawakkil II أبو العز عبد العزيز بن يعقوب المتوكل على الله; Abū al-ʿIzz ʿAbd al-ʿAzīz ibn Yaʿqūb al-Mutawakkil ʿalā'llāh	19 April 1479 – August 1497 (~18 years)	Ya'qub ibn al-Mutawakkil I; Hajj Malak bint Muqbil	1413 – August 1497 (aged 84): Nephew and heir of al-Mustanjid.
16	al-Mustamsik أبو الصبر يعقوب بن المتوكل المستمسك بالله; Abū al-Ṣabr Yaʿqūb ibn al-Mutawakkil al-Mustamsik bi-'llāh	24 September 1497 – 28 November 1508 (~11 years)	al-Mutawakkil II; Amna bint al-Mustakfi II	1441 – 29 March 1521 (aged 80): Named heir by al-Mutawakkil II.; Safavid dynasty founded by Ismail I (1501).; Abdicated in favor of his son.
17	al-Mutawakkil III أبو هارون محمد بن المستمسك المتوكل على الله; Abū Hārūn Muḥammad ibn al-Mustamsik al-Mutawakkil ʿalā'llāh	28 November 1508 – 24 August 1516 (~8 years)	al-Mustamsik	d. 10 November 1543: Named heir by al-Mustamsik.; Mamluk-Portuguese wars.; Mamluk-Ottoman war begins (1516).; Accompanied Sultan Qansuh II to Syria; captured after his defeat against Ottomans.
(16)	al-Mustamsik أبو الصبر يعقوب بن عبد العزيز المستمسك بالله; Abū al-Ṣabr Yaʿqūb ibn ʿAbd al-ʿAzīz al-Mustamsik bi-'llāh	24 October 1516 – 26 January 1517 (~3 months)	al-Mutawakkil II	1441 – 29 March 1521 (aged 80): Brought back to enthrone Tuman Bey II (1516).
(17)	al-Mutawakkil III أبو هارون محمد بن المستمسك المتوكل على الله; Abū Hārūn Muḥammad ibn al-Mustamsik al-Mutawakkil ʿalā'llāh	1517 (Note: The legend of al-Mutawakkil III formally surrendering the title to Selim I is considered by historians to be apocryphal. It emerged in the 1780s, likely to counter Russian claims of "protecting" Ottoman Christians by asserting spiritual authority over Muslims in newly conquered Russian territories. As chroniclers of his era continued identifying al-Mutawakkil III as caliph, the already nominal Abbasid caliphate is suggested to have simply faded away, with al-Mutawakkil III using the title till his death.)	al-Mustamsik	d. 10 November 1543: Ottoman capture of Cairo; Tuman Bey II executed.; Taken to Istanbul by Selim I.; Allowed to return by Suleiman I (1521); spent the rest of his life there.

== Genealogy ==
Family tree of Abbasid rulers. Unless a separate year of death is given, the caliphs ruled till death (or died soon after deposition).
Abbasid Caliphs
Abbasid Caliphs in Cairo

Al-Abbas d. 653
Abd Allah d. 687
Ali d. 736
Muhammad d. 743
al-Saffah r. 750–754	al-Mansur r. 754–775
Ja'far d. 767	al-Mahdi r. 775–785
Zubayda d. 831	al-Rashid r. 786–809	al-Hadi r. 785–786	Ibrahim r. 817–819, d. 839
al-Amin r. 809–813	al-Mamun r. 813–833	al-Mu'tasim r. 833–842
al-Wathiq r. 842–847	al-Mutawakkil r. 847–861	Muhammad d. 850s
al-Muhtadi r. 869–870	al-Muntasir r. 861–862	al-Mu'tazz r. 866–869	al-Mu'tamid r. 870–892	al-Muwaffaq d. 891	al-Musta'in r. 862–866
Abd Allah r. 908	al-Mu'tadid r. 892–902
al-Muktafi r. 902–908	al-Muqtadir r. 908–929, 929–932	al-Qahir r. 929, 932–934 d. 950
al-Mustakfi r. 944–946 d. 949	al-Radi r. 934–940	al-Muttaqi r. 940–944 d. 968	al-Muti r. 946–974	Ishaq d. 988
al-Ta'i r. 974–991 d. 1003	al-Qadir r. 991–1031
al-Qa'im r. 1031–1075
Muhammad d. 1056
al-Muqtadi r. 1075–1094
al-Mustazhir r. 1094–1118
al-Mustarshid r. 1118–1135	al-Muqtafi r. 1136–1160
al-Rashid r. 1135–1136 d. 1138	al-Mustanjid r. 1160–1170
Abu Bakr	al-Mustadi r. 1170–1180
Ali	al-Nasir r. 1180–1225
al-Hasan	al-Zahir r. 1225–1226
al-Hakim I r. 1262–1302	al-Mustansir r. 1261	al-Mustansir r. 1226–1242
Ahmad	al-Mustakfi I r. 1302–1340	al-Musta'sim r. 1242–1258
al-Wathiq I r. 1340–1341 d. 1347	al-Hakim II r. 1341–1352	al-Mu'tadid I r. 1352–1362
al-Mus'tasim r. 1377, 1386–1389 d. 1399	al-Wathiq II r. 1383–1386	al-Mutawakkil I r. 1362–77, 83–89, 1389–1406
al-Musta'in r. 1406–1414 d. 1430	al-Mu'tadid II r. 1414–1441	al-Mustakfi II r. 1441–1451	al-Qa'im r. 1451–1455 d. 1458	al-Mustanjid r. 1455–1479	Ya'qub
Amina	al-Mutawakkil II r. 1479–1497
al-Mustamsik r. 1497–1508, 1516–1517, d. 1521
al-Mutawakkil III r. 1508–1516, 1517, d. 1543

== Bibliography ==
- Al-Tabari, Abu Ja'far Muhammad ibn Jarir (1985–2007). Ehsan Yar-Shater (ed.). The History of Al-Ṭabarī. Vol. 40 vols. Albany, New York: State University of New York Press.
- Bennison, Amira K. (2009). The Great Caliphs: The Golden Age of the 'Abbasid Empire. Princeton: Yale University Press, p. 47. ISBN 0300167989
- Bobrick, Benson (2012). The Caliph's Splendor: Islam and the West in the Golden Age of Baghdad. Simon & Schuster. ISBN 978-1416567622.
- Bosworth, C. E., ed. (1987). The History of al-Ṭabarī, Volume XXXII: The Reunification of the ʿAbbāsid Caliphate: The Caliphate of al-Maʾmūn, A.D. 813–33/A.H. 198–213. SUNY Series in Near Eastern Studies. Albany, New York: State University of New York Press. ISBN 978-0-88706-058-8.
- Bosworth, Clifford Edmund (1996). The New Islamic Dynasties: A Chronological and Genealogical Manual. New Edinburgh Islamic Surveys. Edinburgh: Edinburgh University Press. ISBN 0-7486-2137-7.
- Cobb, P. M. (2000). "ʿUmar (II) b. ʿAbd al-ʿAzīz". In Bearman, P. J.; Bianquis, Th.; Bosworth, C. E.; van Donzel, E. & Heinrichs, W. P. (eds.). The Encyclopaedia of Islam, Second Edition. Volume X: T–U. Leiden: E. J. Brill. pp. 821–822. ISBN 978-90-04-11211-7.
- El-Hibri, Tayeb (2021). The Abbasid Caliphate: A History. Cambridge University Press. ISBN 9781316634394.
- Houtsma, M. Th.; Wensinck, A. J. (1993). E.J. Brill's First Encyclopaedia of Islam 1913–1936. Vol. IX. Leiden: BRILL. ISBN 978-90-04-09796-4.
- Hurvitz, Nimrod (2002). The Formation of Hanbalism: Piety into Power. New York: Routledge. ISBN 0-7007-1507-X.
- Ibn Khallikan (1842). Ibn Khallikan's Biographical Dictionary, Translated from the Arabic. Vol. I. Translated by Baron Mac Guckin de Slane. Paris: Oriental Translation Fund of Great Britain and Ireland. OCLC 1184199260.
- Kennedy, Hugh (2006). When Baghdad Ruled the Muslim World: The Rise and Fall of Islam's Greatest Dynasty. Cambridge, Massachuetts: Da Capo Press. ISBN 978-0-306814808.
- Lane-Poole, Stanley (1894). The Mohammedan Dynasties: Chronological and Genealogical Tables with Historical Introductions. Westminster: Archibald Constable and Company. OCLC 1199708.
- Sourdel, Dominique (1978). "al-Ḳāhir Bi'llāh". In van Donzel, E.; Lewis, B.; Pellat, Ch. & Bosworth, C. E. (eds.). The Encyclopaedia of Islam, Second Edition. Volume IV: Iran–Kha. Leiden: E. J. Brill. pp. 423–424. ISBN 978-90-04-05745-6. OCLC 758278456.
- Zetterstéen, K. V.; Pellat, Ch. (1960). "Ahmad b. Abi Du'ad". The Encyclopedia of Islam, New Edition, Volume I: A–B. Leiden and New York: BRILL. p. 271. ISBN 90-04-08114-3.
- Zetterstéen, K. V. (1987). "al-Muʿtaḍid Bi'llāh". In Houtsma, Martijn Theodoor (ed.). E.J. Brill's First Encyclopaedia of Islam, 1913–1936, Volume VI: Morocco–Ruzzik. Leiden: Brill. p. 777. ISBN 978-90-04-08265-6.
- Zetterstéen, K. V. & Bosworth, C. E. (1993). "al-Muhtadī". In Bosworth, C. E.; van Donzel, E.; Heinrichs, W. P. & Pellat, Ch. (eds.). The Encyclopaedia of Islam, Second Edition. Volume VII: Mif–Naz. Leiden: E. J. Brill. pp. 476–477. doi:10.1163/1573-3912_islam_SIM_5437. ISBN 978-90-04-09419-2.
- Banister, Mustafa (2021). The Abbasid Caliphate of Cairo, 1261–1517: Out of the Shadows. Edinburgh: Edinburgh University Press. ISBN 9781474453363.
- El-Hibri, Tayeb (2021). The Abbasid Caliphate: A History. Cambridge: Cambridge University Press. ISBN 9781107183247.
- Gibb, H. A. R.; et al., eds. (1960). The Encyclopaedia of Islam, New Edition, Volume I: A–B. Leiden: E. J. Brill. ISBN 9004081143.
