= Billah =

Billah (Arabic: بِٱللَّٰه, romanized: bi-ʾllāh) is an Arabic phrase meaning with God or through God. It is used in various standard sayings, such as the Hawqala and the Ta'awwudh. It is also often used as a component of compound personal proper names, particularly as regnal names by caliphs and other rulers when it might be seen as a counterpart of the Christian usage by the grace of God. It is used for example as follows:

- Al-Aziz Billah (Arabic: العزيز بالله, romanized: al-ʿAzīz bi-ʾllāh), mighty through God
  - Al-Aziz Billah (955–996), fifth Fatimid Caliph
- Baqi Billah (Arabic: باقى بالله, romanized: Bāqī bi-ʾllāh), everlasting through God
  - Khwaja Baqi Billah (1563–1603), Sufi saint from Kabul
- Al-Mahdi Billah (Arabic: المهدي بالله, romanized: al-Mahdī bi-ʾllāh), rightly guided through God
  - Muhammad al-Mahdi Billah (744 or 745 – 785), third Abbasid Caliph of Baghdad
  - Abd Allah al-Mahdi Billah (873–934), founder of the Fatimid dynasty
  - Muhammad II al-Mahdi Billah (976–1010), fourth Umayyad Caliph of Córdoba
- Al-Mansur Billah (Arabic: المنصور بالله, romanized: al-Manṣūr bi-ʾllāh), he who is victorious through God
  - Al-Mansur Billah (914–957), third Fatimid Caliph
  - one of the names of Muhammad al-Badr (1926–1996), King and Imam of Yemen
- Al-Muhtadi Billah (Arabic: المهتدي بالله, romanized: al-Muhtadī bi-ʾllāh), rightly guided through God
  - Al-Muhtadi Billah (died 870), fourteenth Abbasid Caliph of Baghdad
  - Al-Muhtadee Billah (born 1974), heir to the Sultan of Brunei
- Al-Muktafi Billah (Arabic: المكتفي بالله, romanized: al-Muktafī bi-ʾllāh), contented with God alone
  - Al-Muktafi Billah (877/78 – 908), seventeenth Abbasid Caliph of Baghdad
  - one of the names of Mahmud of Terengganu (1930–1998), Sultan of Terengganu, Malaysia
- Al-Muntasir Billah (Arabic: المنتصر بالله, romanized: al-Muntaṣir bi-ʾllāh), he who triumphs in God
  - Al-Muntasir Billah (837–862), eleventh Abbasid Caliph of Baghdad
- Al-Mustafa Billah (Arabic: المصطفى بالله, romanized: al-Muṣṭafā bi-ʾllāh), one who is chosen through God
  - one of the names of Abdullah of Pahang (born 1959), Yang di-Pertuan Agong of Malaysia
- Al-Musta'in Billah (Arabic: المستعين بالله, romanized: al-Mustaʿīn bi-ʾllāh), one who asks for help through God
  - Ahmad al-Musta'in Billah (836–866), twelfth Abbasid Caliph of Baghdad
  - Sulayman al-Musta'in Billah (965–1016), fifth Umayyad Caliph of Córdoba
  - Abbas al-Musta'in Billah (1390–1430), tenth Abbasid Caliph of Cairo.
  - one of the names of Ahmad Shah of Pahang (1930–2019), Sultan of Pahang, Malaysia
- Al-Mustakfi Billah (Arabic: المستكفي بالله, romanized: al-Mustakfī bi-ʾllāh), desirous of being satisfied with God alone
  - Al-Mustakfi Billah (905–949), twenty-second Abbasid Caliph of Baghdad
  - Muhammad III al-Mustakfi Billah (976–1025), tenth Umayyad Caliph of Córdoba
  - Al-Mustakfi Billah I (1285–1340), third Abbasid Caliph of Cairo
  - Al-Mustakfi Billah II (1388–1451), twelfth Abbasid Caliph of Cairo
- Al-Musta'li Billah (Arabic: المستعلي بالله, romanized: al-Mustaʿlī bi-ʾllāh), exalted through God
  - Al-Musta'li Billah (1074–1101), ninth Fatimid Caliph
- Al-Mustamsik Billah (Arabic: المستمسك بالله, romanized: al-Mustamsik bi-ʾllāh), one who restrains himself through God
  - Al-Mustamsik Billah (died 1521), sixteenth Abbasid Caliph of Cairo
- Al-Mustanjid Billah (Arabic: المستنجد بالله, romanized: al-Mustanjid bi-ʾllāh), one who implores for help through God
  - Yusuf al-Mustanjid Billah (1124–1170), thirty-second Abbasid Caliph of Baghdad
  - Yusuf al-Mustanjid Billah (died 1479), fourteenth Abbasid Caliph of Cairo
- Al-Mustansir Billah (Arabic: المستنصر بالله, romanized: al-Mustanṣir bi-ʾllāh), one who asks for victory through God
  - Al-Hakam II al-Mustansir Billah (915–976), first Umayyad Caliph of Córdoba
  - Al-Mustansir Billah (1029–1094), eighth Fatimid Caliph
  - Abu Ja'far al-Mustansir Billah (1192–1242), thirty-sixth Abbasid Caliph of Baghdad
  - Ahmad al-Mustansir Billah (died 1261), first Abbasid Caliph of Cairo
  - Ali Shah al-Mustansir Billah (died 1480), thirty-second Nizari Isma'ili Imam
  - Gharib Mirza al-Mustansir Billah (died 1498), thirty-fourth Nizari Isma'ili Imam
- Al-Mustarshid Billah (Arabic: المسترشد بالله, romanized: al-Mustarshid bi-ʾllāh), one who seeks direction through God
  - Al-Mustarshid Billah (1092–1135), twenty-ninth Abbasid Caliph of Baghdad
- Al-Musta'sim Billah (Arabic: المستعصم بالله, romanized: al-Mustaʿṣim bi-ʾllāh), he who holds fast through God
  - Abd Allah al-Musta'sim Billah (1213–1258), last Abbasid Caliph of Baghdad
  - Zakariya al-Musta'sim Billah (died 1389), eighth Abbasid Caliph of Cairo
- Al-Mustazhir Billah (Arabic: المستظهر بالله, romanized: al-Mustaẓhir bi-ʾllāh), one who knows by heart through God
  - Abd al-Rahman V al-Mustazhir Billah (1001–1024), ninth Umayyad Caliph of Córdoba
  - Al-Mustazhir Billah (1078–1118), twenty-eighth Abbasid Caliph of Baghdad
- Al-Mu'tadid Billah (Arabic: المعتضد بالله, romanized: al-Muʿtaḍid bi-ʾllāh), seeking support in God
  - Al-Mu'tadid Billah (853/4 or 860/1 – 902), sixteenth Abbasid Caliph of Baghdad
  - Al-Mu'tadid Billah I (died 1362), sixth Abbasid Caliph of Cairo
  - Al-Mu'tadid Billah II (died 1441), eleventh Abbasid Caliph of Cairo
- Al-Mu'tasim Billah (Arabic: المعتصم بالله, romanized: al-Muʿtaṣim bi-ʾllāh), abstaining from sin through God
  - Al-Mu'tasim Billah (796–842), eighth Abbasid Caliph of Baghdad
  - one of the names of Abdullah al-Muʽtassim Billah Shah of Pahang (1874–1932), Sultan of Pahang, Malaysia
  - one of the names of Abdul Aziz al-Muʽtasim Billah Shah of Perak (1887–1948), Sultan of Perak, Malaysia
  - one of the names of Abdul Halim of Kedah (1927–2017), Sultan of Kedah, Malaysia
  - Proper given name of Mutassim Gaddafi, son of Libyan leader Muammar Gaddafi
  - Motasim Billah Mazhabi (born 1964), Afghan politician
  - Qazi Mu'tasim Billah (1933–2013), Bangladeshi Islamic scholar and teacher
- Al-Mu'tazz Billah (Arabic: المعتز بالله, romanized: al-Muʿtazz bi-ʾllāh), he who is strengthened by God
  - Al-Mu'tazz Billah (847–869), thirteenth Abbasid Caliph of Baghdad
- Al-Muqtadir Billah (Arabic: المقتدر بالله, romanized: al-Muqtadir bi-ʾllāh), mighty through God
  - Al-Muqtadir Billah (895–932), eighteenth Abbasid Caliph of Baghdad
- Al-Qadir Billah (Arabic: القادر بالله, romanized: al-Qādir bi-ʾllāh), powerful through God
  - Al-Qadir Billah (947–1031), twenty-fifth Abbasid Caliph of Baghdad
- Al-Qahir Billah (Arabic: القاهر بالله, romanized: al-Qāhir bi-ʾllāh), victorious through God
  - Al-Qahir Billah (899–950), nineteenth Abbasid Caliph of Baghdad
- Al-Radi Billah (Arabic: الراضي بالله, romanized: al-Rāḍī bi-ʾllāh), content with God
  - Al-Radi Billah (909–940), twentieth Abbasid Caliph of Baghdad
- Al-Rashid Billah (Arabic: الراشد بالله, romanized: al-Rāshid bi-ʾllāh), rightly guided through God
  - Al-Rashid Billah (1109–1138), thirtieth Abbasid Caliph of Baghdad
- Al-Wathiq Billah (Arabic: الواثق بالله, romanized: al-Wāthiq bi-ʾllāh), he who holds trust through God
  - Al-Wathiq Billah (812–847), ninth Abbasid Caliph of Baghdad
  - Al-Wathiq Billah I (died 1341), fourth Abbasid Caliph of Cairo
  - Al-Wathiq Billah II (died 1386), ninth Abbasid Caliph of Cairo
  - one of the names of Taimur bin Feisal (1886–1965), Sultan of Oman
  - one of the names of Mizan Zainal Abidin of Terengganu (born 1962), Sultan of Terengganu, Malaysia
