= Al-Mustakfi II =

al-Mustakfi II المستكفي بالله

12th Caliph of Cairo
- Reign: 23 July 1441 – 4 February 1451 (~10 years)
- Predecessor: al-Mu'tadid II
- Successor: al-Qa'im
- Born: c. 1391; Cairo, Mamluk Sultanate (now Egypt)
- Died: 4 February 1451 (aged 60); Cairo, Mamluk Sultanate (now Egypt)
- Issue: Amina
Names
- Abū al-Rabīʿ Sulaymān ibn al-Mutawakkil al-Mustakfī bi-llāh أبو الربيع سليمان بن المتوكل المستكفي بالله
- Dynasty: Abbasid
- Father: al-Mutawakkil I
- Religion: Islam

Abū al-Rabīʿ Sulaymān ibn al-Mutawakkil (Arabic: أبو الربيع سليمان بن المتوكل, c. 1391 – 4 February 1451), better known by his regnal name al-Mustakfī (II) bi-llāh (Arabic: المستكفي بالله, lit. 'He who is content with God alone'), was the twelfth Abbasid caliph of Cairo under the Mamluk Sultanate. His reign lasted from 1441 to 1451.

== Biography ==
=== Early life and accession ===
Abu al-Rabi Sulayman was born around 1391, one of several sons of caliph al-Mutawakkil I. His elder brother al-Musta'in succeeded their father in 1406. After a brief stint as nominal Sultan of Egypt in 1412, al-Musta'in was deposed by Mamluk sultan al-Mu'ayyad Shaykh in 1414, who installed another brother, al-Mu'tadid II, as his replacement. Having no surviving sons, al-Mu'tadid II arranged to pass the caliphal title to his full-brother Sulayman near the end of his life. Shortly after al-Mu'tadid II's death on 23 July 1441, Sulayman ascended to the caliphate as al-Mustakfi (II) billah.

=== Reign ===
Unlike his brothers al-Musta'in and al-Mu'tadid II, al-Mustakfi II avoided politics and courtly life, focusing instead on the religious duties of his office. A skilled Shafi'i scholar, he had strong ties with the ulama and a patron of the Suyuti family, securing a scholarly post for Abu Bakr Kamal al-Din, father of Jalal al-Din Suyuti. When Ibn Hajar al-Asqalani died in 1449, al-Mustakfi II was a notable participant in his funeral.

al-Mustakfi II's entire reign unfolded within the rule of sultan az-Zahir Jaqmaq, who is reported to have been particularly fond of him. As an important religious symbol of Mamluk socio-political order, the caliph featured heavily in Jaqmaq's public acts of piety. In August 1450, a drought caused the Nile to fall dangerously low, and Jaqmaq ordered al-Mustakfi II and other religious notables to visit holy sites in Cairo and pray for rain.

=== Death and succession ===
After a brief illness, al-Mustakfi II died in his sixties on 4 February 1451 at the Abbasid residence near the tomb of Sayyida Nafisa, where he was also buried. He had not named any heir, and so the responsibility of selecting his successor fell to the Cairene elites. Sultan Jaqmaq summoned his surviving brothers, and the eldest, Hamza, succeeded as al-Qa'im bi amr Allah. His only known child, a daughter named Amina, married her first-cousin, the future caliph al-Mutawakkil II, and bore the future caliph al-Mustamsik.

== Bibliography ==
- Adamec, Ludwig W. (2009). Historical Dictionary of Islam. Scarecrow Press. ISBN 0810861615.
- Banister, Mustafa (2021). The Abbasid Caliphate of Cairo, 1261–1517: Out of the Shadows. Edinburgh: Edinburgh University Press. ISBN 9781474453363.
- Holt, Peter Malcolm (1993). "Al-Musta'in (II)". The Encyclopaedia of Islam: New Edition. Vol. VII (Mif – Naz) (2nd ed.). Leiden: E.J. Brill. ISBN 978-90-04-09419-2.
- Holt, P. M. (1984). "Some Observations on the 'Abbāsid Caliphate of Cairo". Bulletin of the School of Oriental and African Studies. 47 (3). University of London: 501–507. doi:10.1017/s0041977x00113710. JSTOR 618882. S2CID 161092185.

Al-Mustakfi II Mamluk Abbasid dynasty Born: 1391 Died: 1451
Sunni Islam titles
Preceded by Al-Mu'tadid II	Caliph of Cairo; 1441–1451	Succeeded by Al-Qa'im
