= Al-Mutawakkil II =

Caliph of Cairo from 1479 to 1497

al-Mutawakkil II المتوكل على الله

15th Caliph of Cairo
- Reign: 8 April 1479 – 27 September 1497
- Predecessor: al-Mustanjid
- Successor: al-Mustamsik
- Born: 1416; Cairo, Mamluk Sultanate now Egypt
- Died: 27 September 1497 (aged 80–81); Cairo, Mamluk Sultanate now Egypt
- Burial: Egypt
- Spouse: Amina bint Sulayman al-Mustakfi II
- Issue: al-Mustamsik
- Father: Ya'qub bin al-Mutawakkil I
- Mother: Haj al-Malik
- Religion: Sunni Islam

Al-Mutawakkil II (Arabic: أبو العز عبد العزيز المتوكل على الله, Abū l-ʿIzz ʿAbd al-ʿAzīz; 1416 – 27 September 1497) was the fifteenth Abbasid caliph of Cairo for the Mamluk Sultanate between 1479 and 1497. His father, Ya'qub, was son of Al-Mutawakkil I.

== Life ==
His name was Abdul Aziz ibn Ya`qub ibn Muhammad. Al-Mutawakkil II and his mother is called Haji Malik, the daughter of one of the soldiers. He was loved between the private and the public because of the excellence of literature, ethics and humility, and a screen for each one.

When his uncle became ill, and his illness was entrusted to him after the office, when he died on the sixteenth of Muharram of 884. In 885 the prince led a campaign to the Turkmen. He met with the Emir of the State (the White Shah), defeated the Mamluks, captured the Yishpak and was killed on the shore of the Euphrates River. Then the Sultan "Qaitbay" reconciled with the Emirate (the White Shah).

Al-Mutawakkil II reigned for almost two decades since 1479, and as he grew older and largely bedridden, the question of his succession appeared. Although his elder son Umar was a well respected figure at court, al-Mutawakkil II named Ya'qub as heir apparent, followed by latter's uncle Nasir al-Din Muhammad. Al-Mutawakkil II died a few days later aged 84, and Ya'qub was invested as caliph under the title al-Mustamsik billah on 27 September 1497. His succession was contested from the start as his cousin Khalil, son of Nasir al-Din Muhammad, disputed al-Mustamsik's ascent on account of his poor eyesight. However, both the Mamluk sultan al-Nasir Muhammad ibn Qaitbay and other emirs defended al-Mustamsik on the grounds that his father held the caliphate and had named him successor.

== Bibliography ==
- Banister, Mustafa (2021). The Abbasid Caliphate of Cairo, 1261–1517: Out of the Shadows. Edinburgh: Edinburgh University Press. ISBN 9781474453363.
- Garcin, Jean-Claude (1967). "Histoire, opposition, politique et piétisme traditionaliste dans le Ḥusn al Muḥādarat de Suyûti" [History, opposition, politics and traditionalistic pietism in Suyuti's Ḥusn al Muḥādarat] (PDF). Annales Islamologiques (in French). 7. Institut Français d'Archéologie Orientale: 33–90. doi:10.3406/anisl.1967.909. S2CID 259055409. Archived from the original (PDF, 14.62 MB) on 2011-07-24.
- Holt, P. M. (1984). "Some Observations on the 'Abbāsid Caliphate of Cairo". Bulletin of the School of Oriental and African Studies. 47 (3). University of London: 501–507. doi:10.1017/s0041977x00113710. JSTOR 618882. S2CID 161092185.

Al-Mutawakkil II Mamluk Abbasid dynasty Born: 1416 Died: 1497
Sunni Islam titles
Preceded by Al-Mustanjid	Caliph of Cairo; 1479–1497	Succeeded by Al-Mustamsik
