= Mihrajanqadhaq =

Subdivision of the Sasanian Empire, in present-day Iraq

Mihragan-kadag (Middle Persian), mentioned in Islamic works in the Arabized forms Mihrajanqadhaq (مهرجانقذق) and Mihrajan Qashaq, was a district and province in the western Jibal, on the borders with modern-day Iran, in the early Middle Ages. Its capital was the town of Saymarah. Various Arab geographers note that the district was fertile and populous. By the 14th century, the town of Saymarah was falling in ruin, and is now deserted.

== Sources ==
- Le Strange, Guy (1905). The Lands of the Eastern Caliphate: Mesopotamia, Persia, and Central Asia, from the Moslem Conquest to the Time of Timur. Cambridge: Cambridge University Press. p. 202.
- Shahbazi, A. Shapur. (1983). "HORMOZĀN". Encyclopaedia Iranica, Vol. I, Fasc. 5. pp. 460–461.
