= Al-Qa'im (Abbasid caliph at Cairo) =

13th Abbasid caliph in Mamluk Cairo

Abu al-Baqa Hamza al-Qa'im ابو الباقة حمزة القائم بأمر الله

13th Caliph of Cairo
- Reign: 1451–1455
- Predecessor: al-Mustakfi II
- Successor: al-Mustanjid
- Born: unknown date Cairo, Mamluk Sultanate (now Egypt)
- Died: 1458; Cairo, Mamluk Sultanate
- Burial: Egypt
- Father: al-Mutawakkil I
- Mother: Bay Khatun
- Religion: Sunni Islam

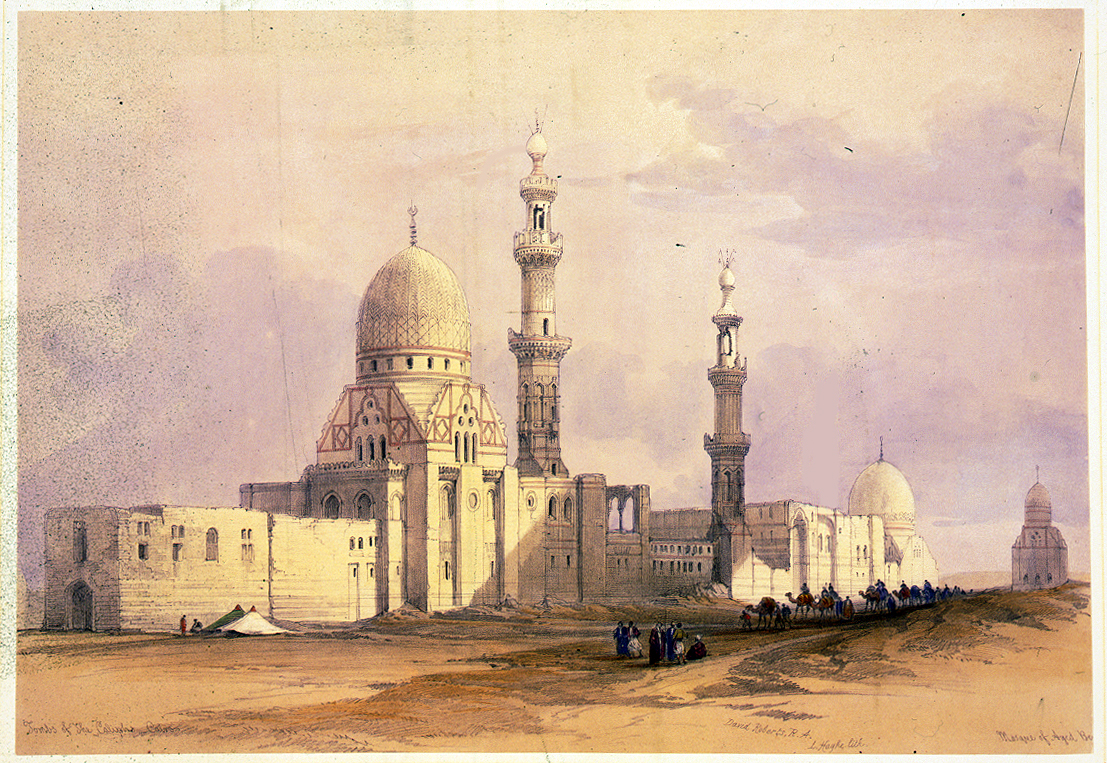
View of Sultan Inal complex, by David Roberts, 1839, in The Holy Land, Syria, Idumea, Arabia, Egypt, and Nubia

Abū al-Baqa Hamza Al-Qa'im (Arabic: ابو الباقة حمزة القائم بأمر الله; died 1458) was the thirteenth Abbasid caliph of Cairo for the Mamluk Sultanate between 1451 and 1455. He was deposed by Sultan Sayf ad-Din Inal after al-Qa'im supported a mutiny of mamluks against Inal.

== Life ==
He was the son of Al-Mutawakkil I and he was the successor to the office after the death of his brother, who was not entrusted with succession to anyone after him. He was a strict man, and he established his reign. Al-Zawahiri died in early 857 AH. The Caliph took his son, Othman, as the ruler of the Sultanate. He took the title of Al-Mansour. He was the ruler of the state, Prince Inal, and a month and a half after he took over the Sultanate.

Most of Uthman's Zahiri mamluks abandoned their support for Inal by 16 March when the Caliph al-Qa'im and the top qadis ("judges") passed a resolution stripping Uthman of his executive authority. Inal, at age 73, was thereby proclaimed sultan and entered the citadel later that week, capturing Uthman. On 9 April Inal had Uthman imprisoned in Alexandria.

On 15 June 1455 Inal faced a mutiny by roughly 500 of his Circassian mamluks after assembling them to launch an expedition against Bedouin tribesmen invading al-Buhayra Province (the Delta region.) Inal had rejected their requests for customary camels as a result of the poor economic conditions of the sultanate. Consequently, the mamluks rallied in Cairo's horse market, refusing to participate in the expedition. Being leaderless, the mutineers were organized and directed by the higher ranking mamluks. They attempted to assassinate Yunus al-Aqba'i, Inal's executive secretary, as he departed from the Cairo Citadel, but his bodyguards warded off the attackers, wounding a few of them. The mutineers were then joined by the recently dismissed Zahiris (the faction which Inal originally hailed from) and subsequently besieged the citadel, demanding higher salaries and the handing over of Yunus. Afterward, Inal sent disciplinary officers to assuage the mamluks concerns, but to no avail. The mamluks proceeded to raid Yunus's house, but were unsuccessful and returned to the horse market. There, Inal sent a herald to offer the mamluks amnesty and their wounded compensation, but they refused and severely beat the herald. After the mamluks blocked the street to the citadel preventing the royal emirs from leaving. Inal dispatched four emirs to negotiate with the mamluks, but they were taken hostage until their demands were met.

The mutiny convinced Caliph al-Qa'im to abandon his support for Inal and join the uprising. With the caliph providing symbolic legitimacy to the mamluks, they took up arms and assaulted the citadel. Finding himself faced with no alternatives, Inal launched an offensive against the mutineers. The Royal Mamluk Guard of the citadel resisted the rebels and eventually dispersed the Zahiris. Inal had al-Qa'im arrested and imprisoned in Alexandria. He was replaced by al-Mustanjid. All mamluks with the exception of the royal guard were removed from their positions in citadel and some of the mutineers were either imprisoned or exiled. Despite the insurrection, Inal supplied the mamluks with the camels they sought and the expedition to al-Buhayra was carried out.

That "Enal" minted the Sultanate in the spring of the first of 857 AH, and took the title of "Ashraf". The Sultan differed with the Al-Qaim. The Sultan seized the Caliph in the month of Jumadi I and imprisoned him in Alexandria. He remained there until he died in 1458 (863 AH) and was buried there. Then the Sultan announced Al-Mustanjid as caliph.

== Bibliography ==
- Garcin, Jean-Claude (1967). "Histoire, opposition, politique et piétisme traditionaliste dans le Ḥusn al Muḥādarat de Suyûti" [History, opposition, politics and traditionalistic pietism in Suyuti's Ḥusn al Muḥādarat] (PDF). Annales Islamologiques (in French). 7. Institut Français d'Archéologie Orientale: 33–90. doi:10.3406/anisl.1967.909. S2CID 259055409. Archived from the original (PDF, 14.62 MB) on 2011-07-24.
- Holt, P. M. (1984). "Some Observations on the 'Abbāsid Caliphate of Cairo". Bulletin of the School of Oriental and African Studies. 47 (3). University of London: 501–507. doi:10.1017/s0041977x00113710. JSTOR 618882. S2CID 161092185.
- Levanoni, Amalia (1995). A Turning Point in Mamluk History: The Third Reign of Al-Nāṣir Muḥammad Ibn Qalāwūn (1310–1341). BRILL. ISBN 9004101829.
- Muir, W. (1896). The Mameluke; or, Slave dynasty of Egypt, 1260–1517, A. D. Smith, and Elder. "Othman Inal Sultan."
- Natho, Kadir I. (2010). Circassian History. Xlibris Corporation. ISBN 978-1441523884.

Al-Qa'im Mamluk Abbasid dynasty Born: ? Died: 1455
Sunni Islam titles
Preceded by Al-Mustakfi II	Caliph of Cairo; 1451–1455	Succeeded by Al-Mustanjid
