= Al-Musta'in (Egypt) =

10th Caliph of Cairo from 1406 to 1414

al-Musta'in المستعين بالله

10th Caliph of Cairo
- Reign: 22 January 1406 – 9 March 1414 (~8 years)
- Predecessor: al-Mutawakkil I
- Successor: al-Mu'tadid II

Sultan of Egypt
- Reign: 7 May 1412 – 6 November 1412 (~6 months)
- Predecessor: al-Nasir Faraj
- Successor: al-Mu'ayyad Shaykh
- Born: 1390; Cairo, Mamluk Sultanate (now Egypt)
- Died: 16 March 1430 (aged 39–40); Alexandria, Mamluk Sultanate (now Egypt)
- Burial: Alexandria
Names
- al-Malik al-ʿĀdil al-Mustaʿīn bi-'llāh Abū al-Faḍl al-ʿAbbās ibn al-Mutawakkil الملك العادل المستعين بالله أبو الفضل العباس بن المتوكل
- Father: al-Mutawakkil I
- Religion: Sunni Islam

Abū al-Faḍl al-ʿAbbās ibn al-Mutawakkil (Arabic: أبو الفضل العباس بن المتوكل; 1390 – 16 March 1430), better known by his regnal name al-Mustaʿīn bi-'llāh (Arabic: المستعين بالله, lit. 'He who asks for help through God') was the 10th Abbasid caliph of Cairo under the Mamluk Sultanate from 1406 to 1414. He was the only Cairo-based caliph to hold political power as Sultan of Egypt, albeit for only six months in 1412. All the other Cairene caliphs were spiritual figureheads lacking any temporal power.

== Life ==
Al-Musta'in was the son of al-Mutawakkil I by a Turkish concubine named Bay Khatun. He succeeded his father as caliph on 22 January 1406. At that point in time, the role of the caliphs had been reduced to legitimizing the rule of the Burji Mamluk sultans through the issuance of certificates of investiture. Al-Musta'in accompanied Sultan Faraj on his campaign in the Levant against the rebel amirs (governors) of Aleppo and Tripoli. Faraj's defeat at Lajjun on 25 April 1412 resulted in anarchy. Al-Musta'in was captured by the rebels, who competed against each other for the sultanate. Unable to choose a candidate from among themselves, the quarreling Mamluks followed the advice of the royal secretary Fath Allah, who had suggested appointing al-Musta'in as sultan.

After formally removing Faraj from office, al-Musta'in reluctantly accepted the sultanate on 7 May 1412. He agreed to take on the post only after having obtained assurance from the Mamluks that he would retain his position as caliph in the event of his deposition from the sultanate. Faraj surrendered and was sentenced to death. His execution took place on 28 May. The Mamluk realms were divided, with Nawruz al-Hafizi receiving the Syrian provinces and al-Musta'in returning to Egypt accompanied by Shaykh al-Mahmudi and Baktamur Djillik. Al-Musta'in took up his residence at the Cairo Citadel on 12 July. He involved himself in the appointment and removal of ministers, and coins were struck in his name. This signalled his intention to rule as sultan and not to content himself with a figurehead role. Worried by such a prospect, Shaykh started to gradually isolate al-Musta'in, nearly turning him into a state prisoner. Baktamur Djillik's death on 15 September accelerated Shaykh's usurpation of power, which became complete when he had himself recognized as sultan on 6 November 1412, whereupon he assumed the title of al-Mu'ayyad. After long hesitation, al-Musta'in formally abdicated the sultanate, and was held in the Citadel. Having filled his role as interim sultan, he expected to remain as caliph, as had been initially agreed upon. However, he was deposed from the caliphate by Shaykh on 9 March 1414, and replaced by his brother al-Mu'tadid II.

Shaykh's dethronement of al-Musta'in was declared unlawful by the ulama. Acting upon this, Nawruz al-Hafizi decided to wage battle against Shaykh. The latter transferred al-Musta'in to Alexandria along with Faraj's three sons on 29 January 1417. According to 15th-century historian al-Suyuti, al-Musta'in remained in the Mediterranean city until the reign of Sultan Sayf ad-Din Tatar, when he was released and allowed to return to Cairo. However, he preferred to stay in Alexandria, where he received considerable sums of money from the merchants. He died there of plague in 1430 at less than 40 years of age. In retrospect, al-Musta'in's short reign as sultan is viewed as a failed attempt at producing an Abbasid revival. In 1455, his brother al-Qa'im equally tried and failed to hold power as sultan. Nevertheless, al-Musta'in's position as caliph was recognized far beyond Egypt's borders, with distant rulers such as Ghiyasuddin Azam Shah of Bengal sending him large sums of money.

== See also ==
- List of monarchs who lost their thrones in the 15th century

Al-Musta'in Mamluk Abbasid dynasty Born: c. 1390 Died: 1430
Sunni Islam titles
Preceded by Al-Mutawakkil I	Caliph of Cairo; 22 January 1406 – 9 March 1414	Succeeded by Al-Mu'tadid II
Regnal titles
Preceded by Faraj	Sultan of Egypt; 7 May 1412 – 6 November 1412	Succeeded by Shaykh al-Mahmudi
