= Al-Mustansir II =

Abbasid prince, uncle of caliph al-Musta'sim and 1st Caliph in Mamluk Cairo (died 1261)

al-Mustansir II المستنصر بالله

1st Caliph of Cairo
- Reign: 13 June 1261 – 28 November 1261 (~5 months)
- Predecessor: al-Musta'sim (as Abbasid caliph in Baghdad)
- Successor: al-Hakim I
- Born: Baghdad, Abbasid Caliphate (now Iraq)
- Died: 28 November 1261 al-Anbar, Ilkhanate (now Fallujah, Iraq)
Names
- Abū'l-Qāsim Aḥmad ibn al-Ẓāhir al-Mustanṣir bi-llāh أبو القاسم أحمد بن الظاهر المستنصر بالله
- Dynasty: Abbasid
- Father: al-Zahir
- Religion: Sunni Islam

Abū'l-Qāsim Aḥmad ibn al-Ẓāhir (Arabic: أبو القاسم أحمد بن الظاهر; died 28 November 1261), better known by his regnal name al-Mustanṣir (II) bi-llāh (Arabic: المستنصر بالله, lit. 'He who asks for victory through God') was the first Abbasid caliph at Cairo under the Mamluk Sultanate. Installed by sultan Baybars, he reigned for almost five months before being killed in battle before Mongols in an attempt to retake Baghdad.

== Biography ==
=== Background and proclamation ===
Abu'l-Qasim Ahmad was the son of caliph al-Zahir and the brother of caliph al-Mustansir. As a potentially rival member of the Abbasid family, he had been imprisoned by his nephew, caliph al-Musta'sim. In 1258, Mongols sacked Baghdad and executed al-Musta'sim. In the ensuing panic, Ahmad was freed by the Mongols, and hid amongst the Bedouin tribes in the desert. In 1260, the Mamluks of Egypt defeated and drove out Mongols from Levant at the Battle of Ain Jalut. At this point, Ahmad traveled to Syria in hopes of securing official support. The Mamluk emirs near Damascus alerted their sultan, Baybars, about his arrival. Baybars dispatched his troops to confirm the man's Abbasid identity and bring him to Cairo.

Ahmad arrived at Cairo citadel, and on 13 June 1261, in a lavish ceremony, was publicly proclaimed caliph al-Mustansir billah, which he possibly had already taken as a homage to his brother. Baybars and ulama offered the pledge of allegiance to the caliph, while al-Mustansir invested the sultan with lands in his possession as well as authorization to rule any future conquests made at the expense of non-Muslims. Baybars also received the title of Qasim Amir al-Mu'minin (Associate of the Commander of the Faithful) from the caliph as the guarantor of the caliphate. Coins were struck in the name of the caliph and the sultan, and announcements were sent around the sultanate announcing the return of the caliphate. The sharif of Mecca, Abu Numayy Muhammad, also recognized al-Mustansir's caliphate, abandoning his acknowledgement of the Hafsid caliph of Tunis, also titled al-Mustansir.

=== Military campaign and death ===
After his installation and relevant public appearances, Baybars and his emirs decided that al-Mustansir should be sent with an army to reclaim his ancestral seat of Baghdad. Baybars assembled a force of 2700 horsemen and 100 newly purchased mamluks, and with al-Mustansir rode to Damascus, arriving on 6 October. From there, Baybars drastically reduced the force accompanying al-Mustansir to just 300 men, who left for Iraq on 19 October. On the way, al-Mustansir was joined by Bedouin chieftains who appended their forces to al-Mustansir's.

A few days later, al-Mustansir's force reached the town of Ana, where he encountered rival caliph al-Hakim I and his forces, proclaimed and sent by mamluk ruler of Aleppo, Aqqush al-Barli. The populace of Ana had denied al-Hakim I allegiance and access to the town, vowing to open the gates only for al-Mustansir, the caliph to whom the sultan himself had pledged allegiance to. Upon his arrival, the townspeople of both Ana and al-Hadhita submitted to al-Mustansir, and even al-Hakim's own forces abandoned him and acknowledged al-Mustansir as caliph. Al-Mustansir encouraged his distant kinsman, who had no choice but to set aside his claim and acknowledge al-Mustansir, to units their forces in the name of the Abbasid family.

News of caliph's arrival and modest progresses reached Karabugha, the Mongol commander of Iraq, who sent a force of 5000 troops to confront him. Al-Mustansir advanced and took a few more towns before encountering Mongol forces at the banks of Euphrates at al-Anbar. The next morning on 28 November, the two forces collided, and the Mongols launched a feigned retreat that drew the al-Mustansir's forces into an ambush. Al-Mustansir was killed, and al-Hakim I and other survivors fled to Isa ibn Muhanna's protection in Syria. He eventually made his way to Cairo, being proclaimed the successor to al-Mustansir in November of 1262. The line of caliphs he founded lasted till the Ottoman conquest of Egypt in 1517. While most of the Muslim world did not take these caliphs seriously as they were mere instruments of the sultans, they still lent a certain legitimation to the Mamluk rule.

== Bibliography ==
- Banister, Mustafa (2021). The Abbasid Caliphate of Cairo, 1261–1517: Out of the Shadows. Edinburgh: Edinburgh University Press. ISBN 9781474453363.
- Tritton, A. S. (1948). "The Tribes of Syria in the Fourteenth and Fifteenth Centuries". Bulletin of the School of Oriental and African Studies. 12 (3/4): 567–573. doi:10.1017/s0041977x00083129. JSTOR 608712. S2CID 161392172.
- Holt, P. M. (1984). "Some Observations on the 'Abbāsid Caliphate of Cairo". Bulletin of the School of Oriental and African Studies. 47 (3). University of London: 501–507. doi:10.1017/s0041977x00113710. JSTOR 618882. S2CID 161092185.
- Jackson, Sherman A. (1996). Islamic Law and the State: The Constitutional Jurisprudence of Shihāb Al-Dīn Al-Qarāfī. Leiden: Brill. p. 50. ISBN 90-04-10458-5.
- Abun-Nasr, Jamil (1987). A history of the Maghrib in the Islamic period. Cambridge: Cambridge University Press. ISBN 0521337674.

Al-Mustansir II Mamluk Abbasid dynasty Born: ? Died: 28 November 1261
Sunni Islam titles
Recreated Baghdad Caliphate destroyed due to Mongol conquest Title last held by Al-Musta'sim	Caliph of Cairo; 13 June 1261 – 28 November 1261	Succeeded by Al-Hakim I
