= Al-Mustamsik =

al-Mustamsik المستمسك بالله

16th Caliph of Cairo (first period)
- Reign: 24 September 1497 – 28 November 1508 (~11 years)
- Predecessor: al-Mutawakkil II
- Successor: al-Mutawakkil III

(second period)
- Reign: 24 October 1516 – 26 January 1517 (~3 months)
- Predecessor: al-Mutawakkil III
- Successor: al-Mutawakkil III
- Born: 1441; Cairo, Mamluk Sultanate (now Egypt)
- Died: 29 March 1521 (aged 80); Cairo, Ottoman Empire (now Egypt)
- Issue: al-Mutawakkil III
Names
- Abū al-Ṣabr Yaʿqūb ibn al-Mutawakkil al-Mustamsik bi-'llāh أبو الصبر يعقوب بن المتوكل المستمسك بالله
- Dynasty: Abbasid
- Father: al-Mutawakkil II
- Mother: Amina bint al-Mustakfi II
- Religion: Islam

Abū al-Ṣabr Yaʿqūb ibn al-Mutawakkil (Arabic: أبو الصبر يعقوب بن المتوكل, 1441 – 29 March 1521), better known by his regnal name al-Mustamsik bi-'llāh (Arabic: المستمسك بالله, lit. 'He who holds fast to God') was the sixteenth and penultimate Abbasid caliph of Cairo under the tutelage of the Mamluk Sultanate. He reigned as caliph from 1497 to 1508, before abdicating the position to his son, al-Mutawakkil III. He was later brought back briefly in 1516 when his son was captured during the Second Ottoman-Mamluk war, essentially to enthrone the last Mamluk sultan, Tuman Bey II.

== Biography ==
=== Early Life ===
Al-Mustamsik was born Sharaf al-Din Ya'qub in 1441 to the future caliph al-Mutawakkil II and his first-cousin, Amina, daughter of caliph al-Mustakfi II. This makes al-Mustamsik one of only two Abbasid caliphs to have been descended from the dynasty both patrilineally and matrilineally (the other being al-Amin, whose mother Zubayda was the grand-daughter of al-Mansur). He had at least one older half-brother, al-Rukni Umar (d. 1508), born to an Abyssinian concubine.

=== Accession ===
Al-Mustamsik's father al-Mutawakkil II reigned for almost two decades since 1479, and as he grew older and largely bedridden, the question of his succession appeared. Although his elder son Umar was a well respected figure at court, al-Mutawakkil II named Ya'qub as heir apparent, followed by latter's uncle Nasir al-Din Muhammad. Al-Mutawakkil II died a few days later aged 84, and Ya'qub was invested as caliph under the title al-Mustamsik billah on 27 September 1497. His succession was contested from the start as his cousin Khalil, son of Nasir al-Din Muhammad, disputed al-Mustamsik's ascent on account of his poor eyesight. However, both the Mamluk sultan al-Nasir Muhammad ibn Qaitbay and other emirs defended al-Mustamsik on the grounds that his father held the caliphate and had named him successor.

=== First Reign ===
al-Nasir Muhammad's reign ended violently when his atabeg Qansuh al-Khamsi deposed him and had himself proclaimed sultan by the caliph and chief qadis. Soon after, al-Nasir Muhammad was murdered by his father's mamluks in Giza on 31 October 1498. Qansuh's usurpation was soon ended by al-Zahir Qansuh, uncle of al-Nasir Muhammad and a mamluk and dawadar of his father, Qaitbay. al-Zahir Qansuh himself was a placeholder for the more powerful mamluk emir Tumanbay. He was soon replaced by al-Ashraf Janbalat in July 1500.

Aware of how fragile his position was, Janbalat had his mamluks swore fealty over the supposed Uthmanic Quran in the presence of al-Mustamsik and the four qadis. This however, was unable to secure his rule as the same month, Tumanbay marched on Cairo from Damascus and deposed Janbalat in January 1501. Enthroned as al-Adil Tumanbay, he received a public endorsement, like all Mamluk sultans, from the caliph.

Political situation soon changed when Tumanbay himself was overthrown by his mamluks, who put forward the reluctant veteran Qansuh al-Ghawri as the next sultan. In a formal ceremony in May 1501, al-Mustamsik and the four qadis presided over the official investiture of al-Ashraf Qansuh II. Ever fearful of rebellion from his soldiers, Qansuh continued the practice started by Janbalat, of having his officers swear fealty over the Uthmanic codex in caliph's presence, which all acted as symbols of religious accountability for sultan's rule.

=== Abdication ===
For most of his reign, al-Mustamsik served as a pious participant at Qansuh's ceremonies and stayed clear of politics. His failing eyesight and possible illiteracy had set him apart from his father's scholarly reputation. His cousin Khalil, who had challenged his accession a decade ago, saw this as grounds for claiming the caliphal title for himself. In November 1508, he began an aggressive campaign and confronted al-Mustamsik during his monthly audience with Sultan Qansuh, declaring that his blindness invalidated his caliphate. Al-Mustamsik's son, Nasir al-Din Muhammad, came to his father's defense by turning the attack back on Khalil, arguing that Khalil had a speech impediment that would invalidate his recitation of Quran's al-Fatiha and thus, his prayers. When ordered to demonstrate his recitation on the spot by Sultan Qansuh, Khalil visibly struggled.

When proceedings resumed several days later, Khalil brought forth his claim to the caliphate based on the will of caliph al-Mutawakkil II, who had named his son al-Mustamsik and his brother Nasir al-Din Muhammad as heirs. Khalil emphasized that with Nasir al-Din Muhammad dead, he being his son was next in line. al-Mustamsik counter-argued that this Nasir al-Din Muhammad referred to his own son, who shared the same name. The qadis ultimately ruled in al-Mustamsik's favor, who then formally abdicated in favor of his son Muhammad, now called al-Mutawakkil (III) alallah. Khalil, failed in his campaign, left Cairo and exiled himself to the holy cities in Hejaz.

=== Retirement ===
Al-Mustamsik was allowed to stay in Cairo after paying a ransom of 12,000 dinars to Qansuh, who saw a chance to financially extort the former caliph by otherwise threatening an exile. Already an old man in his seventies, he faded into background as al-Mutawakkil III took over the religious and civic duties of the office. His cousin Khalil returned to Cairo with his family in 1514 as an ill and old man, and reconciled with al-Mustamsik shortly before his death.

By the end of 1516, tensions between the Mamluk and Ottoman empires had reached their peak, culminating in the Second Ottoman-Mamluk war. Financially burdened by his war effort against the Ottomans, Qansuh restored to seizing property of private individuals across the empire, al-Mustamsik included. The sultan confiscated a significant portion of his estate by framing it as a repayment of a supposed debt the former caliph owed him. As he began marching to Syria to face the Ottoman army, Qansuh also ordered the caliph al-Mutawakkil III to accompany him.

=== Second Reign ===
Qansuh's stagnating Mamluk sultanate could not bear the brunt of the Ottoman invasion, and in November 1516, he died fighting the Ottoman army at the battle of Marj Dabiq. Al-Mutawakkil III and other elites were captured by sultan Selim I. With Ottoman forces approaching Cairo, the Mamluk emirs persuaded the Qansuh's nephew and Egypt's caretaker, Tumanbay, to take the sultanate and continue the resistance against the Ottomans. Tradition required an Abbasid caliph to preside over a sultan's investiture, but with al-Mutawakkil III in Ottoman custody, the Mamluk emirs decided to bring al-Mustamsik out of retirement for the formal installation. While there was a brief talk of installing one of Khalil's sons instead, al-Mustamsik's earlier abdication likely assured them that he would step down again once al-Mutawakkil III returned.

The surviving emirs and ulama of Cairo ratified al-Mustamsik's delegation of sultanic authority to al-Ashraf Tumanbay II as a deputy acting on the behalf of still-captive caliph al-Mutawakkil III. This investiture was the only major act the caliph did during his brief return, and after negotiations between Tumanbay II and Selim I broke down, the Ottoman sultan invaded and defeated Tumanbay's forces. The victorious sultan entered Cairo accompanied by the returning caliph al-Mutawakkil III on 26 January 1517. Tumanbay II himself was caught and executed a few months later on 13 April 1517, and Egypt was formally annexed by Selim I as an Ottoman province.

=== Final years and death ===
Selim I's return to Constantinople was accompanied by the exile of several important figures, including al-Mutawakkil III. The Ottomans also seized the shrine of Sayyida Nafisa from Abbasid family, which had been a source of income for the elderly al-Mustamsik. Ottomans also seized the family heirlooms in al-Mustamsik's custody, including the alleged sword of al-Musta'sim, the last Abbasid caliph of Baghdad. While several members of Abbasid family were taken to Constantinople, including the sons of Khalil, al-Mustamsik was left in peace due to his old age.

Al-Mustamsik spent the rest of his years in Cairo, losing his eyesight completely by the end like his mother Amina. He died on 29 March 1521, and was buried near his parents close to the shrine of Sayyida Nafisa. Reportedly, al-Mutawakkil III was allowed to return to Cairo by Selim's successor Suleiman I at this time, where he lived till his own death in 1543.

== Bibliography ==
- Gabrieli, F. (1960). "al-Amīn". In Gibb, H. A. R.; Kramers, J. H.; Lévi-Provençal, E.; Schacht, J.; Lewis, B. & Pellat, Ch. (eds.). The Encyclopaedia of Islam, Second Edition. Volume I: A–B. Leiden: E. J. Brill. pp. 437–438. OCLC 495469456.
- Alexander, David (2006). "Swords from Ottoman and Mamluk Treasuries". Artibus Asiae. 66 (2).
- Banister, Mustafa (2014). "Naught Remains to the Caliph but his Title: Revisiting Abbasid Authority in Mamluk Cairo". Mamlūk Studies Review. 18.
- Banister, Mustafa (2021). The Abbasid Caliphate of Cairo, 1261–1517: Out of the Shadows. Edinburgh: Edinburgh University Press. ISBN 9781474453363.
- Becker, Carl (1916). "Barthold's Studien über Kalif und Sultan". Der Islam. 6.
- Holt, P. M. (1984). "Some Observations on the 'Abbāsid Caliphate of Cairo". Bulletin of the School of Oriental and African Studies. 47 (3). University of London: 501–507. doi:10.1017/S0041977X00113710. JSTOR 618882. S2CID 161092185.
- Petry, Carl (1993). Twilight of Majesty: The Reigns of the Mamluk Sultans al-Ashraf Qāytbāy and Qānṣūh al-Ghawrī in Egypt. Seattle: University of Washington Press.
- Rāġib, Yusuf (1977). "Al-Sayyida Nafīsa: sa légende, son culte et son cimetière (suite et fin)". Studia Islamica (45).

Al-Mustamsik Abbasid dynasty (Cairo) Born: 1470s Died: 1521
Sunni Islam titles
Preceded by Al-Mutawakkil II	Caliph of Cairo; 1497–1508	Succeeded by Al-Mutawakkil III
Preceded by Al-Mutawakkil III	Caliph of Cairo; 1516–1517	Succeeded by Al-Mutawakkil III
