= Al-Mu'tadid II =

al-Mu'tadid II المعتضد بالله

11th Caliph of Cairo
- Reign: 1414 – 23 July 1441
- Predecessor: al-Musta'in
- Successor: al-Mustakfi II
- Born: unknown date Cairo, Mamluk Sultanate now Egypt
- Died: 23 July 1441; Cairo, Mamluk Sultanate now Egypt
- Father: al-Mutawakkil I
- Mother: Kazal (Turkic concubine)
- Religion: Islam

Al-Mu'tadid II (Arabic: أبو الفتح داود المعتضد بالله, Abū l-Fatḥ Dāwud al-Muʿtaḍid bi-Llāh; died 23 July 1441) was the eleventh Abbasid caliph of Cairo for the Mamluk Sultanate between 1414 and 1441.

His half-brother Abu al-Fadl al-Musta'in was deposed by sultan al-Mu'ayyad Shaykh in 1414, who installed al-Mu'tadid II, as his replacement.

Al-Mu'tadid II remained in the office from 1414 to 1441. Having no surviving sons, al-Mu'tadid II arranged to pass the caliphal title to his full-brother Sulayman near the end of his life. Shortly after al-Mu'tadid II's death on 23 July 1441, Sulayman ascended to the caliphate as al-Mustakfi (II) billah.

== Bibliography ==
- Banister, Mustafa (2021). The Abbasid Caliphate of Cairo, 1261–1517: Out of the Shadows. Edinburgh: Edinburgh University Press. ISBN 9781474453363.
- Holt, Peter Malcolm (1993). "Al-Musta'in (II)". The Encyclopaedia of Islam: New Edition. Vol. VII (Mif – Naz) (2nd ed.). Leiden: E.J. Brill. ISBN 978-90-04-09419-2.
- Garcin, Jean-Claude (1967). "Histoire, opposition, politique et piétisme traditionaliste dans le Ḥusn al Muḥādarat de Suyûti" [History, opposition, politics and traditionalistic pietism in Suyuti's Ḥusn al Muḥādarat] (PDF). Annales Islamologiques (in French). 7. Institut Français d'Archéologie Orientale: 33–90. doi:10.3406/anisl.1967.909. S2CID 259055409. Archived from the original (PDF, 14.62 MB) on 2011-07-24.
- Holt, P. M. (1984). "Some Observations on the 'Abbāsid Caliphate of Cairo". Bulletin of the School of Oriental and African Studies. 47 (3). University of London: 501–507. doi:10.1017/s0041977x00113710. JSTOR 618882. S2CID 161092185.

Al-Mu'tadid II Mamluk Abbasid dynasty Born: ? Died: 1441
Sunni Islam titles
Preceded by Al-Musta'in	Caliph of Cairo; 1414–1441	Succeeded by Al-Mustakfi II
