= Bulletin of the School of Oriental & African Studies =

Bulletin of the School of Oriental and African Studies
- Discipline: African studies, Asian studies
- Language: English
- Edited by: Ayman Shihadeh

Publication details
- Former names: Bulletin of the School of Oriental Studies; Bulletin of the School of Oriental Studies, University of London; Bulletin of the School of Oriental Studies, London Institution
- History: 1917–present
- Publisher: Cambridge University Press on behalf of the SOAS University of London

Standard abbreviations
- ISO 4: Bull. Sch. Orient. Afr. Stud.

Indexing
- ISSN: 0041-977X (print); 1474-0699 (web)

Links
- Journal homepage

The Bulletin of the School of Oriental and African Studies, founded in 1917 (one year after the foundation of the School) as Bulletin of the School of Oriental Studies, is an interdisciplinary journal of Asian and African studies, published by Cambridge University Press on behalf of the SOAS University of London. The first editor was also the first director of the School, Edward Denison Ross. The name changed in 1940 as a consequence of the change in the School's name (changed 1938) to incorporate African Studies. Later editors have included Christopher Shackle, T.H. Barrett, and G.R. Hawting, and its current editors are Ayman Shihadeh and Mulaika Hijjas.
