= Mashhad Radd al-Shams =

Mosque in Hillah, Babil Province, Iraq

- مشهد رد الشمس
- Location of the mosque in Iraq

Religion
- Affiliation: Shia Islam
- Ecclesiastical or organisational status: Mosque
- Status: Active

Location
- Location: Hillah, Babylon Governorate
- Country: Iraq
- Interactive map of Mashhad Radd al-Shams
- Coordinates: 32°29′34″N 44°25′51″E

Architecture
- Style: Abbasid
- Completed: 13th century

Specifications
- Domes: One (initially two)
- Dome height (outer): 22 m (72 ft)
- Minaret: One
- Minaret height: 15 m (49 ft)

The Mashhad Radd al-Shams (Arabic: مشهد رد الشمس, romanized: Mashhad Radd al-Shams, lit. 'Observation of the Return of the Sun') is a Shi'i mosque located in Hillah, in the Babylon Governorate of Iraq. It marks the spot where, according to local tradition, the sun stopped for Ali ibn Abi Talib when his followers missed the obligatory Asr prayer.

== Historical background ==
=== Origins of the Mashhad ===
==== Temple to Shamash ====
It is generally believed that the Mashhad was originally a pagan temple to Shamash, the Mesopotamian sun god, built by Neo-Babylonian King Nebuchadnezzar II. With the advent of Islam, the temple was transformed into a mosque.

==== Association with Ali and Joshua ====
According to local tradition and legend in the area, when Ali, the fourth Rashidun Caliph and first Twelver Imam, returned from the Battle of Nahrawan, his son, Imran, was wounded and then died. Ali and his forces then buried him near Babylon. Afterwards, a section of the army crossed the Euphrates, they missed the Asr prayer time, so they asked Ali to pray to God to return the sun for them so that they could perform what they had missed of the prayer. God answered the prayer and brought the sun back. This story gave the location its current name: Mashhad Radd al-Shams.

The legend is also notable for its similarities to Joshua 10. In the Biblical passage, five Amorite kings in Palestine, led by Adonizedek the king of Jerusalem, besiege Joshua bin Nun and the Israelites. Joshua is asked by his followers to ask God to stop the sun so that they can finish the battle. The sun stood for an entire day so that Joshua could fight the Amorite kings. Due to this connection, it was claimed that Joshua bin Nun's tomb was beneath the Mashhad. However, there's no evidence to support this claim.

=== Abbasid period ===
Likely, the Mashhad dates back to the reign of Abbasid Caliph al-Nasir (c. 1180 – 1225), who was sympathetic to the Alids and usually dabbled in their thought. He had considered himself a deputy of the long-awaited Mahdi, who's also the last of the Twelver Imams, and took an interest in the Kadhimiyya Shrine in Baghdad, building a tomb opposite of the Imam Muhammad al-Jawad's tomb. Therefore, a lot of historians and writers agree that the Mashhad's current structure dates back to his reign. Around the time of al-Nasir, it was visited by Herati traveler and writer Ali ibn Abi Bakr al-Harawi.

=== Later events ===
A cemetery was established next to the Mashhad that the Muslim residents of Hillah, including Sunni Muslims, buried their dead in. It was also a site where dead children were buried because it wasn't permissible to bury them in Najaf or Karbala. Among the buried is also the son of Iraqi poet Sheikh Hamadi al-Kawaz. However, residential buildings were built over the cemetery in the 1970s.

In 2022, it was reported that the conical dome of the mosque was in danger of collapsing. Cracks had started appearing on the dome, and this threatened the stability of the dome. The factors were said to have been erosion, as well as a lack of maintenance.

== Architecture ==
The mosque also has a single 15-metre-high (49 ft) minaret that is topped by a blue dome. The minaret does not contain a staircase for the muezzin; the balcony is only for display purposes. The mosque used to have a golden dome. It was even described by Sayyid Kamal al-Din in his book Fuqaha al-Fayha and it was said to be famous for this feature. But this dome does not exist in the present day.

=== The Sun Dome ===
The current conical dome, nicknamed the Sun Dome, is believed to date back to the 13th century CE, although when exactly is subject to debate. The oldest mention of the Sun Dome dates back to al-Isharat ila Ma'rifat al-Ziyarat by Ali ibn Abi Bakr al-Harawi, who visited Iraq and called it a "Qubba" which was sometimes used synonymously with "Mashhad." The conical dome is similar in appearance to many other conical domes around Iraq, also dating back to the Abbasid period, such as that of Mausoleum of Umar Suhrawardi in Baghdad's Rusafa, Zumurrud Khatun Mosque in Baghdad's Karkh, and the Tomb of Ezekiel in al-Kifl.

The Sun Dome is about 12 meters high. It sits on a 6.5-meter-high octagonal base that is supported externally by two semi-cylinder towers. It may have been supported by eight semi-cylinder towers before its expansion. Above the base, there's another octagonal base that is two meters high. Its eight sides measure 3.13 meters wide each, and each contains a window that allows air and light in.

== See also ==
- Shia Islam in Iraq
- List of mosques in Iraq
