= Al-Zahir bi-Amr Allah =

Abbasid Caliph in Baghdad (r. 1225–1226)

al-Ẓāhir bi-Amr Allāh الظاهر بأمر الله
- Khalīfah; Amir al-Mu'minin
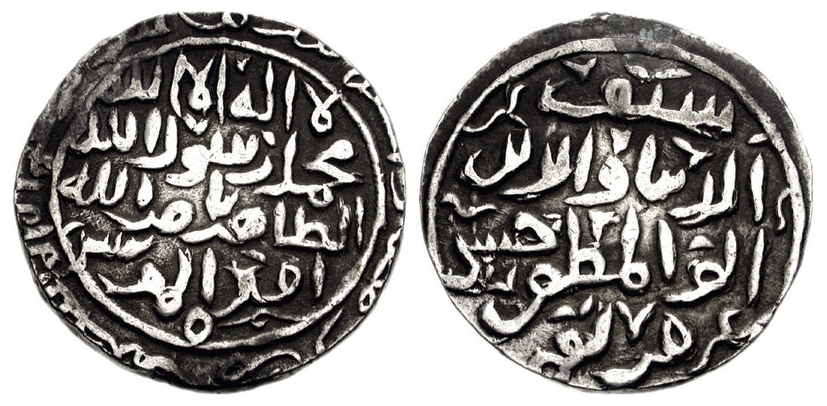
- Coinage of Saif al-Din al-Hasan (1239–1249), ruler of the Qarlughids. Sindh mint. In the name of the Abbasid Caliph, al-Zahir. Struck in 1225-1226 CE.

35th Caliph of the Abbasid Caliphate Abbasid Caliph in Baghdad
- Reign: 5 October 1225 – 10 July 1226
- Predecessor: al-Nasir
- Successor: al-Mustansir
- Born: 1175; Baghdad (Iraq)
- Died: 10 July 1226 (aged 51); Baghdad
- Burial: Baghdad
- Consort: Bab Jawhar; Hayat Khatun; Zahra
- Issue: Mansur al-Mustansir
Names
- Abū Nasr Muhammad ibn Ahmad al-Nāsir al-Zāhir bi-Amr Allāh
- Dynasty: Abbasid
- Father: al-Nasir
- Mother: Asma
- Religion: Sunni Islam

Abū Nasr Muhammad ibn al-Nāsir (Arabic: أبو نصر محمد بن الناصر; 1175 – 11 July 1226), better known with his regnal name al-Ẓāhir bi-Amr Allāh (الظاهر بأمر الله, lit. 'He Who Appears Openly by the Order of God'), was the Abbasid caliph in Baghdad from 1225 to 1226. He succeeded his father al-Nasir in the year 1225 as the thirty-fifth Abbasid Caliph.

== Early life ==
Al-Zahir bi-Amr Allah was the son of al-Nasir and Umm Muhammad Asma. His full name was Muhammad ibn Ahmad al-Nāsir and his Kunya was Abu Nasr. He was named as successor in 1189.

During the reign of his father al-Nasir, as a young prince, Muhammad (future al-Zahir) witnessed the rise of the futuwwa groups, connected to Baghdad's long-standing ayyarun. These urban social groups had long existed in Baghdad and elsewhere, and they were often involved in urban conflicts, especially sectarian riots. His father, al-Nasir made them into an instrument of his government, reorganizing them along Sufi lines and ideology. A testament to its rapid rise in influence over the region, His father al-Nasir approved of and supported futuwwa. In 1182, al-Nasir was initiated into the ranks of the futuwwa, donning their vestments and drinking salt water in the name of its head Shaykh. Over time, the Caliph would use futuwwa as a clever means of asserting caliphal power through religious hierarchy rather than regional power. He was particularly known to distribute the vestments of futuwwa to regional leaders in an assertion of his higher-rank. Though the original text of the Caliph's 1207 reform measures have been lost, reproductions describe an attempt at restructuring and institutionalizing futuwwa in a manner beneficial to Caliphal authority. One 1221 mission to Anatolia, for example, sought to propagate this reform to the Islamic frontier. Its contents include such measures as a strengthening of the important of the distribution of the trousers of futuwwa by the caliph and an assertion of Caliphal responsibility in protecting buildings of the futuwwa.

Ultimately, al-Nasir's appropriation of futuwwa led to the flowering of literature regarding the institution. Instead of taming the brotherhoods into monolithic units of caliphal control, however, the reform measures spawned an unprecedented diversity of thought regarding the organizations, and new innovations and interpretations abounded. It continued for some time after the death of its founder. Al-Nasir's attempt to restructure the institution in a manner consolidating his control over Islamic society.

His father, Al-Nasir maintain good relations with Muslim scholar and Sufi Shihab al-Din 'Umar al-Suhrawardi. From an early age onwards, Suhrawardi studied Islamic jurisprudence, law, logic, theology, Quranic studies and Hadith studies. Suhrawardi quickly excelled in his studies and mastered, at an early age, the Shafi'i and Hanbali school of thought. Suhrawardi was eventually designated as Shaykh al-Islam by his father.

Young Al-Zahir's influential grandmother Zumurrud died in December 1202–January 1203, or January–February 1203, and was buried in her own mausoleum in Sheikh Maarouf Cemetery. Her mausoleum is known as Zumurrud Mausoleum.

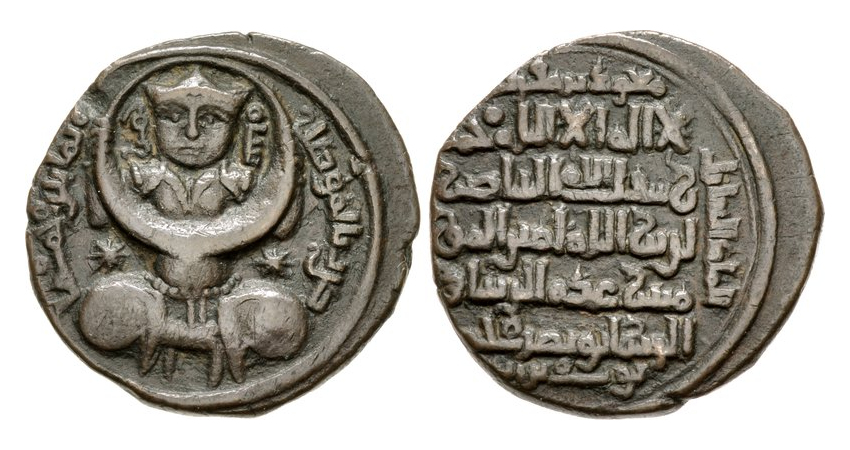
Coinage of Izz al-Din Mas'ud, with crowned Turkic figure holding a moon symbol. Mosul mint, dated 1189-90. The reverse mentions the name and titles of the Abbasid caliph al-Nasir and Abbasid heir in five lines, and the name and titles of the Ayyubid overlord Saladin, and 'Izz al-Din Mas'ud.

Al-Nāṣir had originally named his eldest son Muḥammad as his successor in 585 AH (1189). He later changed his decision in favour of his younger son, ʿAli (also known as Malik al-Mu'azzam and Abu'l-Hasan Ali). However, ʿAli died in 612 AH (1215–1216), leaving Muḥammad as the only surviving male heir. Muḥammad was consequently restored as heir-apparent, and the people were again required to give him the oath of allegiance.

According to Ibn al-Athīr, Muḥammad was closely watched and kept under strict supervision in his father's household, leaving him little freedom to act independently.

== Reign ==
His father, Al-Nasir spent his last three years paralysed and nearly blind. He suffered from severe illness for twenty days and then died. Following the death of al-Nāṣir at the end of Ramaḍān 622 AH (October 1225), Muḥammad became caliph and adopted the regnal title al-Ẓāhir bi-Amr Allāh. His reign was brief, lasting approximately nine months and fourteen days. He died on 14 Rajab 623 AH (11 July 1226) and was succeeded by his eldest son, al-Mustanṣir.

Medieval Muslim historians generally regarded al-Ẓāhir favourably, particularly for his personal character. He was portrayed as pious, God-fearing, generous, just and gentle. Some historians compared his religious character with that of the caliph Umar ibn Abd al-ʿAzīz, who was renowned for his piety. In political affairs, however, al-Ẓāhir appears to have played a relatively limited role. His influence over the administration was described as minor both before and after his accession, and he did not exercise a significant influence over the broader course of government.

In his short reign, he lowered the taxes, and built a strong army to resist invasions. The Al-Sarai Mosque, which was first built by his father al-Nasir. The mosque was mentioned by Muslim historian Sibt ibn al-Jawzi in his writings. In the year following the death of his father, Al-Zahir built a library in the mosque as well as transferring many Qur'ans in the mosque. The mosque continued to play an important role for centuries in Baghdad.

=== Succession ===
Al-Zahir died on 10 July 1226, nine months after his accession. He was succeeded by al-Mustansir bi-llah. His son Al-Mustansir's reign occurred during a period of considerable political uncertainty in the Islamic world and preceded the Mongol invasions in Eastern Islamic world.

== Family ==
One of al-Zahir's concubines was Hayat Khatun. She was of Turkish origin, a favored and trusted concubine, and the mother of one of his sons. She was manumitted upon his death and became a free woman. She died on 16 August 1241, and was buried in the mausoleum of the caliph al-Mustadi. Another of his concubines was Bab Jawhar. She was a Turkish slave who was also a favorite of al-Zahir. She died on 1 August 1241, and was buried near the caliphal tombs in the Rusafah Cemetery. Another of his concubines was a Turkish slave. She was the mother of the future Caliph al-Mustansir. Al-Zahir's other notable son was Abu al-Qasim Ahmad.

== See also ==
- Mausoleum of Umar Suhrawardi
- Muhammad bin Hasan al-Baghdadi

al-Zahir Abbasid dynasty Cadet branch of the Banu Hashim Born: 1175 Died: 10 July 1226
Sunni Islam titles
Preceded by al-Nasir	Caliph of Islam; Abbasid Caliph; 5 October 1225 – 10 July 1226	Succeeded by al-Mustansir
