= Bab al-Wastani =

One of the gates of Baghdad

- Arabic: باب الوسطاني
- Baghdad, Iraq
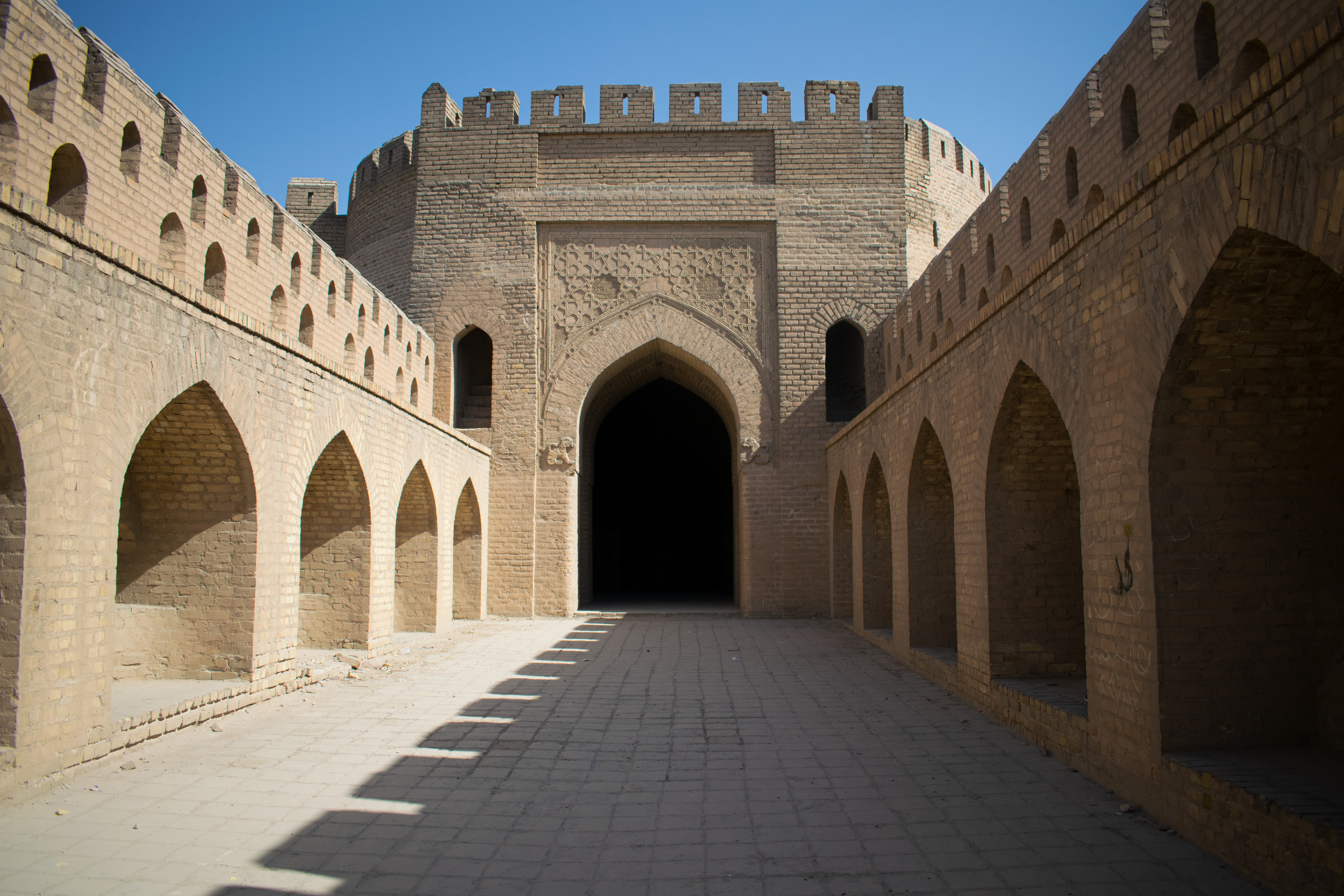
- The northern entrance of Bab al-Wastani from the arched wall

Site information
- Type: Defensive line
- Condition: Preserved

Site history
- Built: 1121; 905 years ago
- Built by: Caliph al-Nasir
- In use: 1121; 905 years ago to 1917; 109 years ago

Bab al-Wastani (Arabic: باب الوسطاني, lit. 'The Middle Gate'), also used to be known as Bab al-Dha'fariyya (Arabic: باب الظفرية, lit. 'Gate of the Nail') is the only surviving gate of Baghdad in Iraq. It's known for being situated near the Mausoleum of 'Umar al-Suhrawardi and the al-Wardiyya Cemetery. The gate was restored in the 20th century and now can be overlooked from the Muhammad al-Qassim Highway.

After World War I, the gate began to house several military museums.

== History ==
During the late Abbasid Era, the 28th Caliph, al-Mustazhir (r. 1094–1118 CE), built a new wall around the eastern side of Baghdad to protect it from invading armies and Bedouin raids. Along with the wall came several gates, the gates, including this one, were ordered to be built by al-Mustazhir's successor, caliph al-Nasir. Bab al-Wastani, alongside Bab al-Talsim, was built as part of the wall of caliph al-Mustazhir. Also known as Bab al-Dha'fariyya, the gate faces east and the caliph added an inscription on the gate that partially survives today. During the late Abbasid era, some neighborhoods became associated with the walls and gates due to being surrounded by fortifications to separate them from fields and agricultural land.

== Architecture and features ==
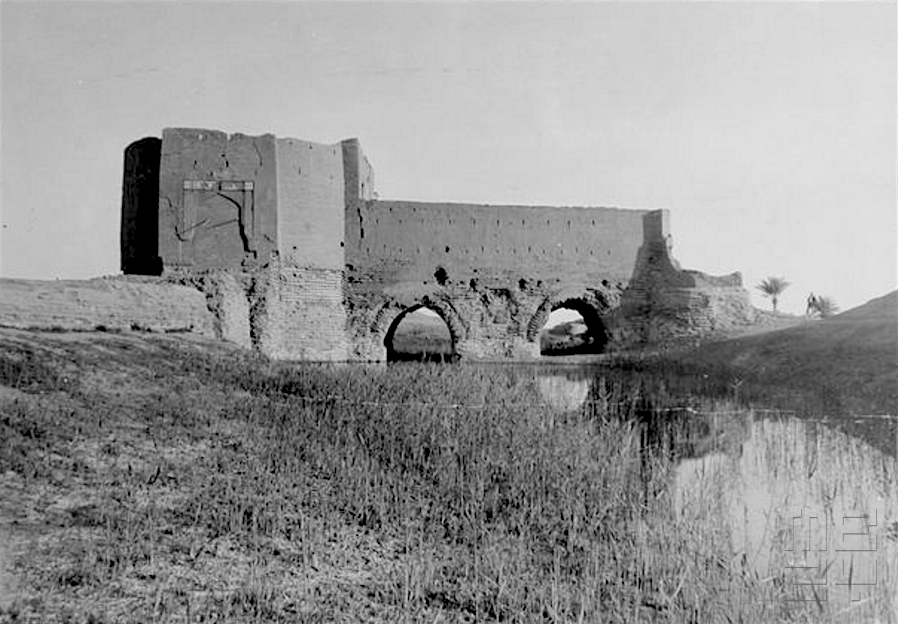
Bab al-Wastani in the 20th-century, note the arches above the moat.

The complex contains the last remaining remnants of the wall of eastern Baghdad and the last surviving gate of Baghdad. Both are built from the same brick type. The gate is reminiscent of the gates of the Round City built by caliph al-Mansur due to being a curved military entrance. The gate is located in the back of the Abbasid mausoleum of Muslim scholar Shihab al-Din 'Umar al-Suhrawardi. The gate contains a 14.5 meters tall cylindrical tower with a door with a topped arch on the north of the tower.

The façade of the entrance contains decorations and inscriptions. The top contains a writing strip with geometric styles and star shapes below it. As well as plant and flower inscriptions on parts of it. Above the moat is an arch and a vault that leads to the entrance to the city. The interior contains a room shaped like an octagon topped by an interior dome. The western part of the tower contains another door leading to a much wider vault surrounded by two straight walls. Both sides of the entrances contain small inscriptions of lions.

== See also ==
- Abbasid architecture
- Abbasid Palace
- Bab al-Mu'adham
- Bab al-Talsim
- Gates of Baghdad
- Round City of Baghdad
