= Gates of Baghdad =

City fortifications

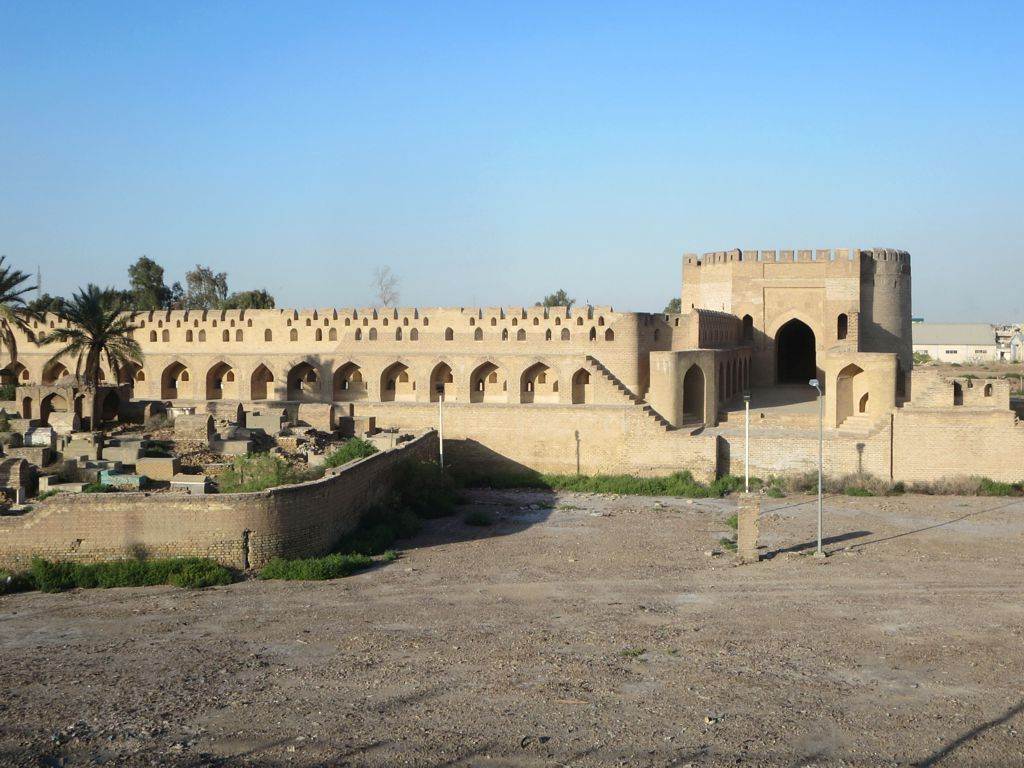
Bab Al-Wastani, 2016.

The gates of Baghdad (Arabic: أبواب بغداد) are the several bab, meaning gate in Arabic, connected by walls surrounding the city of Baghdad. The gates and the walls were designed to protect the city from foreign incursions. Some of the components date back to the Abbasid era, while others were preserved and renovated during the Ottoman era.

== History ==
The Round city of Baghdad was constructed by the Abbasid Caliph Abu Ja’far al-Mansur during 762–768, surrounded by enclosures with four gates, namely Bab al-Kufa ("gate of Kufa"), Bab al-Sham ("gate of al-Sham or Damascus"), Bab al-Khorasan ("gate of Khorasan"), and Bab al-Basra ("gate of Basra"). However, these four gates were eventually destroyed. Today the area is the neighborhood of Karkh in Mansour district, which located in southwest Baghdad.

During the late Abbasid era, the 28th caliph, al-Mustazhir, laid out a plan to expand the enclosure with additional walls, gates, moats and obstructions against invaders. The expansion plan was carried out during the reign of the succeeding Caliph al-Mustarshid, and additional four gates were constructed, namely Bab al-Muadham, Bab ash-Sharqi, Bab al-Talsim and Bab al-Wastani. These four gates remained long after the fall of the Abbasid Caliphate.

== Gates ==
=== Main gates ===
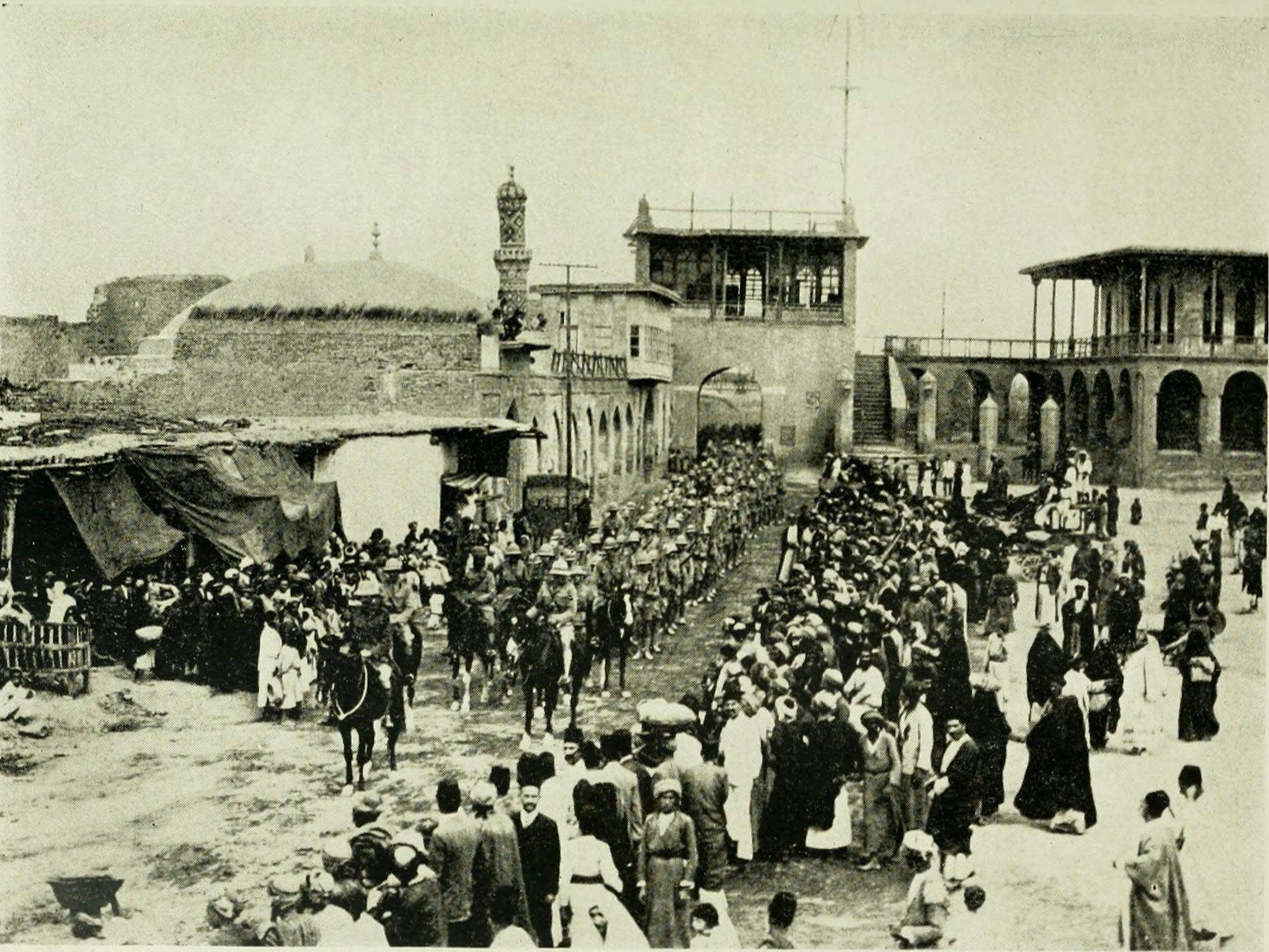
Indian Army soldiers enter Baghdad from Bab al-Mu'adham gate in 1917

- Bab al-Mu'adham (Arabic: باب المعظم), also known as Bab al-Sultan, was located at the beginning of the Al-Muadi Street nearby the Abu Hanifa Mosque in Adhamiyah district. The remains of the gate no longer exist as they were demolished after the Allied capture of Baghdad. Today the surrounding area is referred by its name, where is considered as one of the centers of Baghdad.
- Bab al-Sharqi (Arabic: باب الشرقي) was located in ash-Sharqi quarter of the old Baghdad at the end of al-Rashid Street. The origin of the gate is the gates of Baghdad during the Ottoman era. The gate was turned into a church after the Allied capture in 1917 and later demolished in 1937.

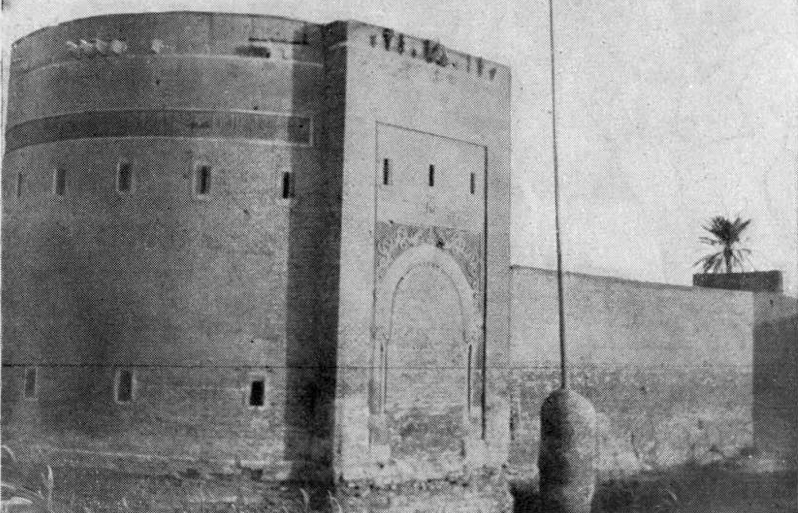
Bab al-Talsim before destruction in 1917.

- Bab al-Talsim (Arabic: باب الطلسم), also known as Bab al-Halba or Talisman Gate, was expanded and restored in 1220 by Caliph al-Nasir, who left a decorative friezes and inscriptions around the gate. The gate was destroyed by the Ottoman troops in 1917 during their withdrawal from Baghdad, in order to prevent it from being turned into a warehouse by the advancing Allied forces. The gate was already described by Ibn Jubayr in 1185, and is mentioned in the accounts of the Mongol Siege of Baghdad (1258). Before 1221, it was known as the "White gate" (Bab Halba). A polo field in front of the gate was inaugurated in 1086 by Seljuk sultan Malik Shah. In 1638, the gate was closed and bricked over by the Ottoman Sultan Murad IV after his conquest of the city. The stone figures representing a ruler sitting cross-legged between two dragons have not been securely attributed to any ruler, but may belong to the period of Murad IV. The cross-legged ruler may also be personification of the sun.

An inscription ran on the wall above the gate, mentioning the caliph as “the imām, to whom the whole of humanity has to submit,” as well as “the caliph who is initiated by the master of the world and who is a proof for Allāh of the entirety of beings”.

- Bab al-Wastani (Arabic: باب الوسطاني), also known as Bab Khorasan, is the only remaining gate today. The gate is known for situated nearby the Mausoleum of Umar Suhrawardi. During the late 20th century, the site was restored which can be overlooked from the Muhammad al-Qassim Highway. At the same time, the surrounding graves and mosques which date back to Abbasid era, known as Al-Wardiyya Cemetery, were uprooted in order to build the infrastructure for tourism surrounding the gate.

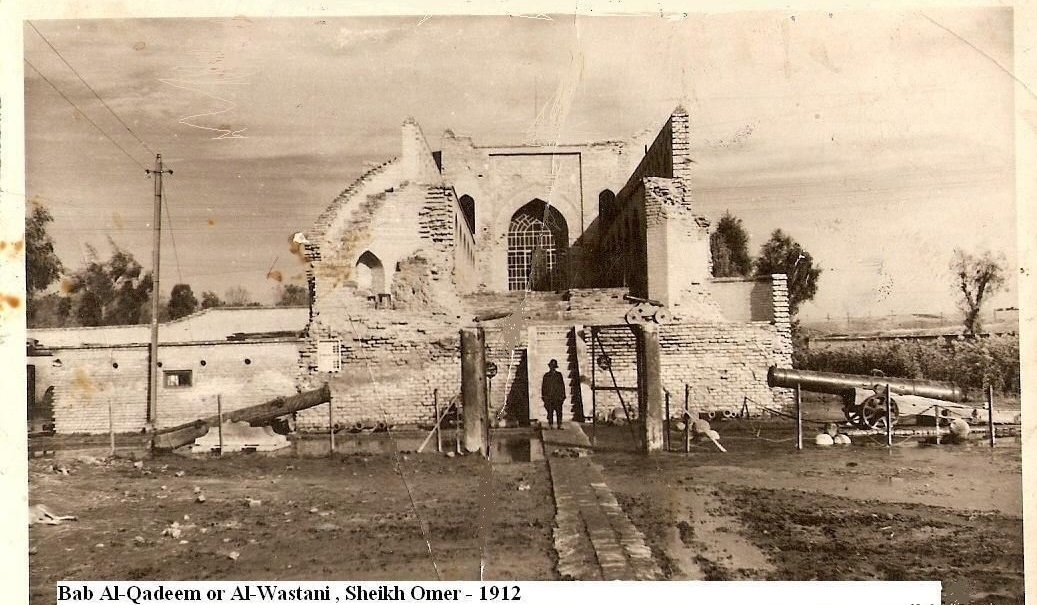
The Bab al-Wastani gate, photographed in 1918

=== Other gates ===
- Bab al-Aga (Arabic: باب الأغا) was located in today's Bab al-Aga neighborhood.
- Bab al-Sheikh (Arabic: باب الشيخ) named after Shaykh ʿAbd al-Qādir al-Jīlānī, is a gate located in today's Bab al-Sharqi neighborhood.
