= Bab al-Talsim =

Historical Abbasid Gate in Baghdad

- Arabic: باب الطلسم
- Baghdad, Iraq
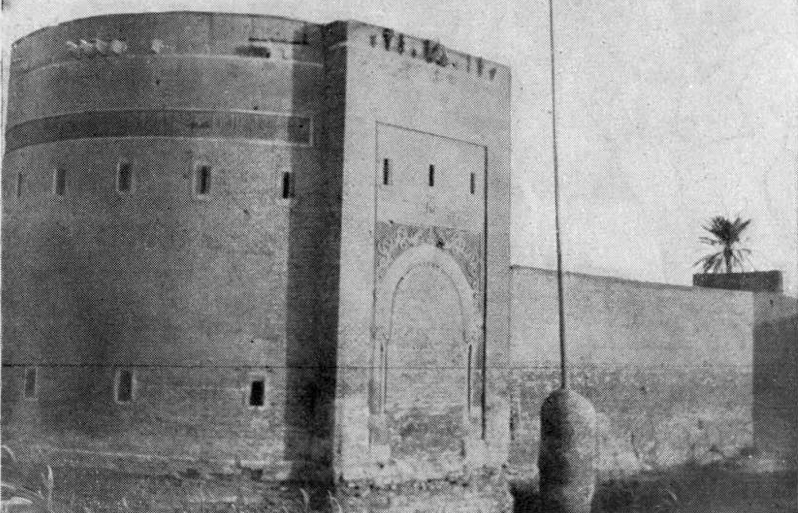
- Bab al-Talsim before its destruction by Ottoman forces in 1917 during World War I.

Site information
- Type: Defensive line

Site history
- Built: 1121; 905 years ago
- Built by: Caliph al-Nasir
- In use: 1123; 903 years ago to 1917; 109 years ago
- Demolished: 11 March 1917

Bab al-Talsim (Arabic: باب الطلسم, romanized: Gate of Talisman), originally named Bab al-Halba (Arabic: باب الحلبة, romanized: The White Gate), was an old Abbasid gateway that existed on the Rusafa side of Baghdad, Iraq, and was one of the old gates of Baghdad. The gate was preserved and well-maintained until Ottoman troops demolished it on 11 March 1917 when retreating from the city during World War I.

== History ==
During the late Abbasid Era, the 28th Caliph, al-Mustazhir (r. 1094–1118 CE), built a new wall around the eastern side of Baghdad to protect it from invading armies and Bedouin raids. Along with the wall came several gates, one of which was the Bab al-Talsim, then known as Bab al-Halba. Which would be fully completed by Caliph al-Mustarshid (r. 1118–1135 CE) in 1123. Over time, several Abbasid Caliphs would repair the walls of Eastern Baghdad. In 1221, Caliph al-Nasir restored the gates and walls of Baghdad and decorated Bab al-Halba with an inscription and a tower.

Al-Nasir's inscription on the gate depicts two knotted serpents or dragons who are being held by a seated figure who is believed to be the Caliph himself. The inscription became known for being talismanic among the people of Baghdad as it was believed to give protection against Baghdad's enemies. Due to this, the gate later gained its more well-known name of Bab al-Talsim. Due to the fact that the gate was located next to the Hadhrat al-Qadiriyya, the gate was also nicknamed "Bab al-Sheikh Abd al-Qadir" but was shortened to Bab al-Sheikh, which became the name of the neighborhood surrounding the Qadiriyya.

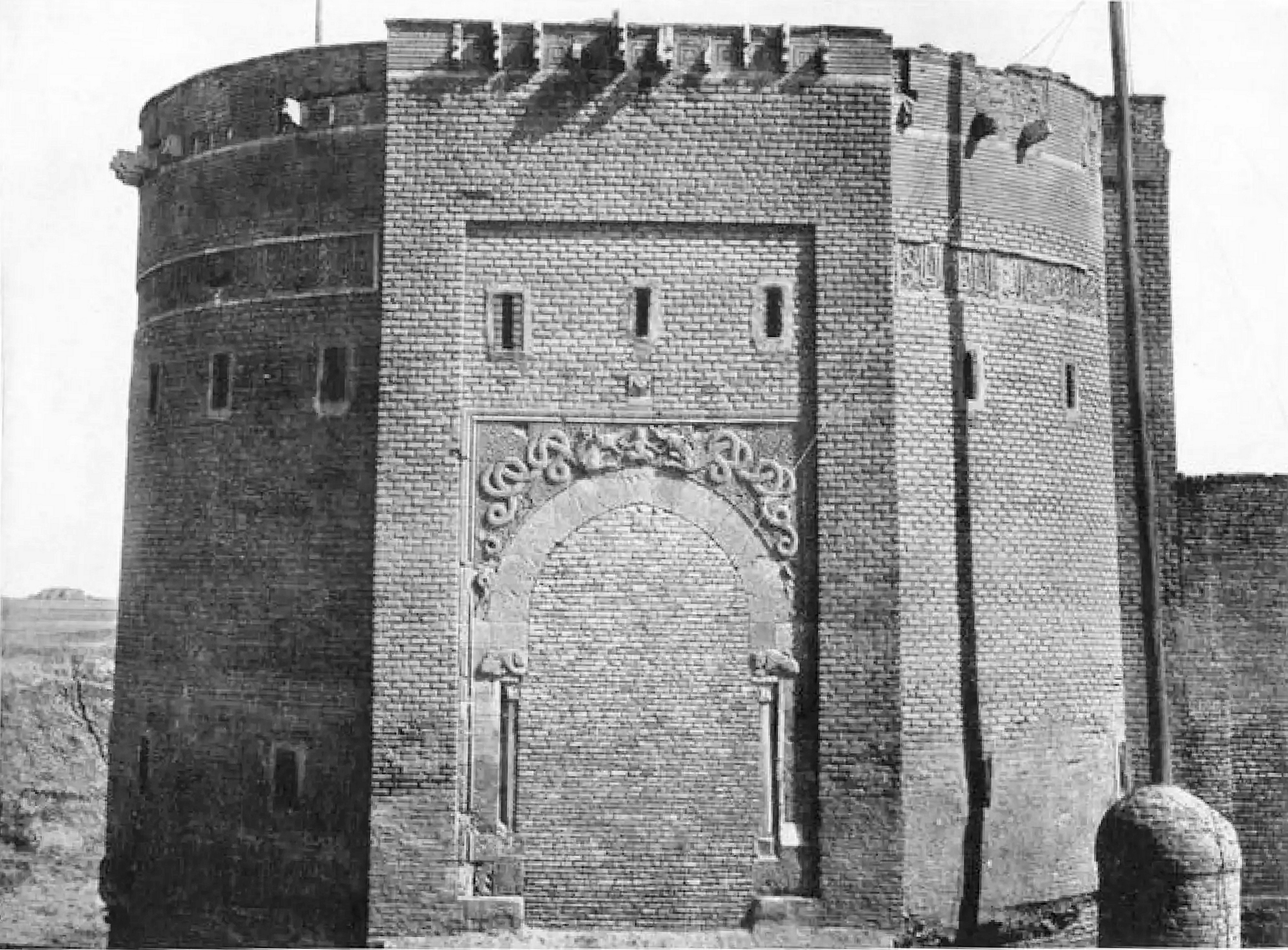
Bab al-Talsim's entrance photographed by Frederick Simpich in 1914.

Before al-Nasir's restoration, the gate was already described by the Andalusian traveler Ibn Jubayr in 1185. It was mentioned in the accounts of the Mongols' 1258 Siege of Baghdad. A polo field in front of the gate was inaugurated in 1086 by Seljuk Sultan Malik Shah. Bab al-Wastani is located north of where Bab al-Talsim once stood. When Sultan Suleiman the Magnificent ordered a map to be made of Baghdad in 1534, Bab al-Talsim wasn't included despite the details of the map. In 1638, Ottoman Sultan Murad IV conquered Baghdad, he entered through the gate and had it sailed and closed off. During the late parts of World War I, the Ottoman Empire was losing the war. To prevent the British Empire from storing gunpowder inside the gate, Ottoman troops destroyed the gate on 11 March 1917 while withdrawing from Baghdad, leaving no surviving remnants of the Abbasid gate today.

=== Rediscovery ===
In 1982, work was underway to pave a new road in Bab al-Sheikh when the old foundations of Bab al-Talsim were discovered. The Iraqi Department of Antiquities quickly carried out excavations at the site and uncovered the remaining remains of the gate. After several researchers studied the area through historical sources, it was confirmed to be the old site of the gate.

== Architecture and features ==
The gate was a cylindrical tower built out of burnt bricks and connected to the northeastern ramparts of Baghdad. The main façade of the tower contained several smaller loophole windows halfway through the middle. The top of the façade included pointed arch openings on the entire circumference, serving as an open balcony. The gate contained stone voussoirs and included several decorations and inscriptions.

An inscription ran on the wall above the gate, mentioning the Abbasid Caliph as “the Imām, to whom the whole of humanity has to submit,” as well as “the Caliph who is initiated by the master of the world and who is a proof for Allāh of the entirety of beings.”

=== The dragons and the caliph ===
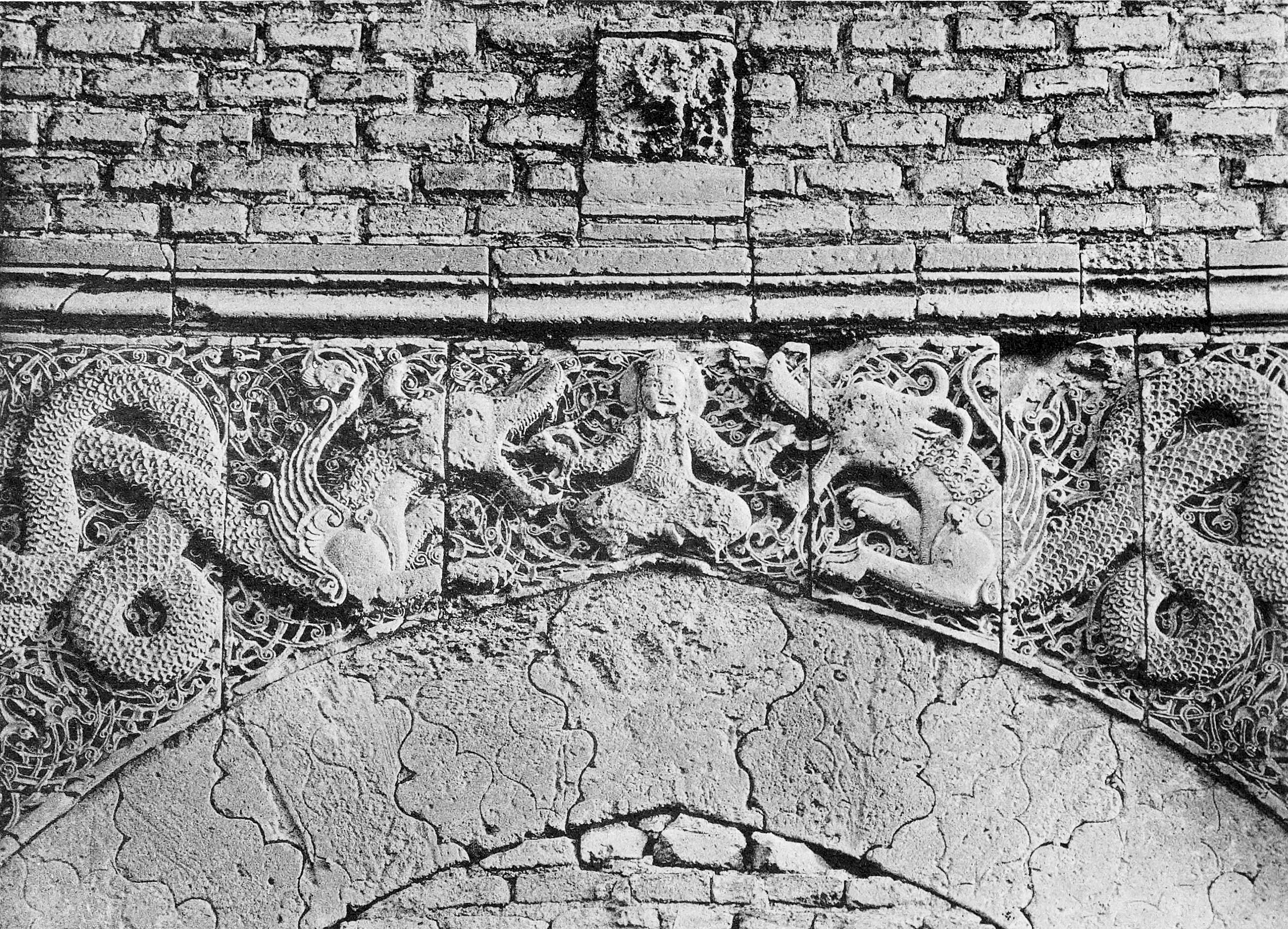
The engravings on the gate depicting a figure, possibly al-Nasir, holding the tongues of two serpent-dragons.

The most notable part about the gate was the detailed stone-craved inscriptions depicting a seated human figure, possibly a ruler, grasping the tongues of two dragons or serpents. A very unusual carving that was uncommon but can be seen in a similar paired dragon carving on a gate in the Citadel of Aleppo. The stone figures representing a ruler sitting cross-legged between two dragons have not been securely attributed to any ruler, but theorized to belong to the period of Murad IV.

But the seated figure is generally more agreed to be the figure of al-Nasir since the carvings were part of his restoration of the gate. The carvings could symbolize his victory over his two major enemies at the time: the Grand Master of the Order of Assassins, and the Khwarizmian Empire ruler Muhammad II.

The seated cross-legged figure may also be personification of the sun.

Gallery of Bab al-Talsim's features

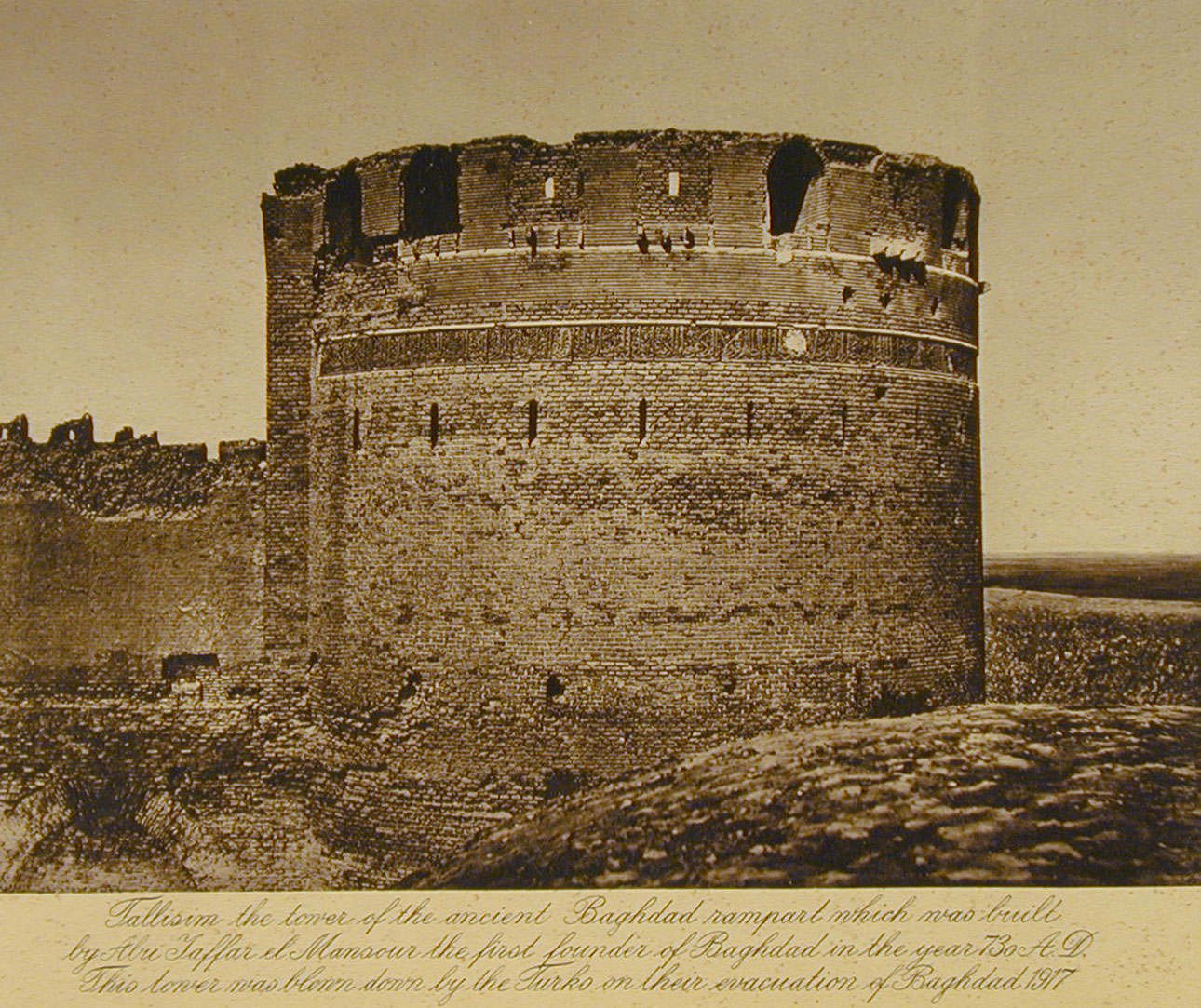
Pre-1917 photograph of the gate

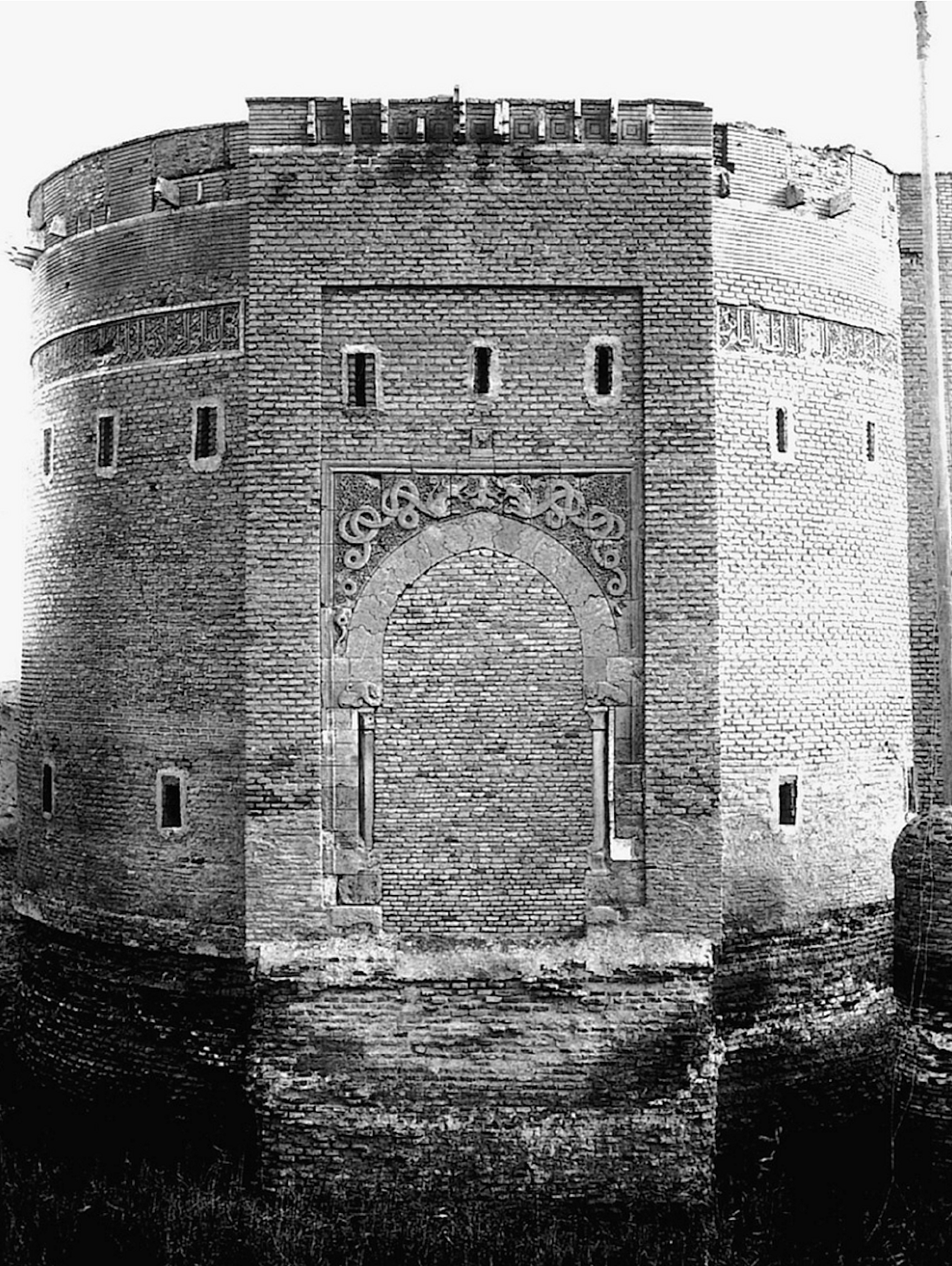
The front view of the gate's tower

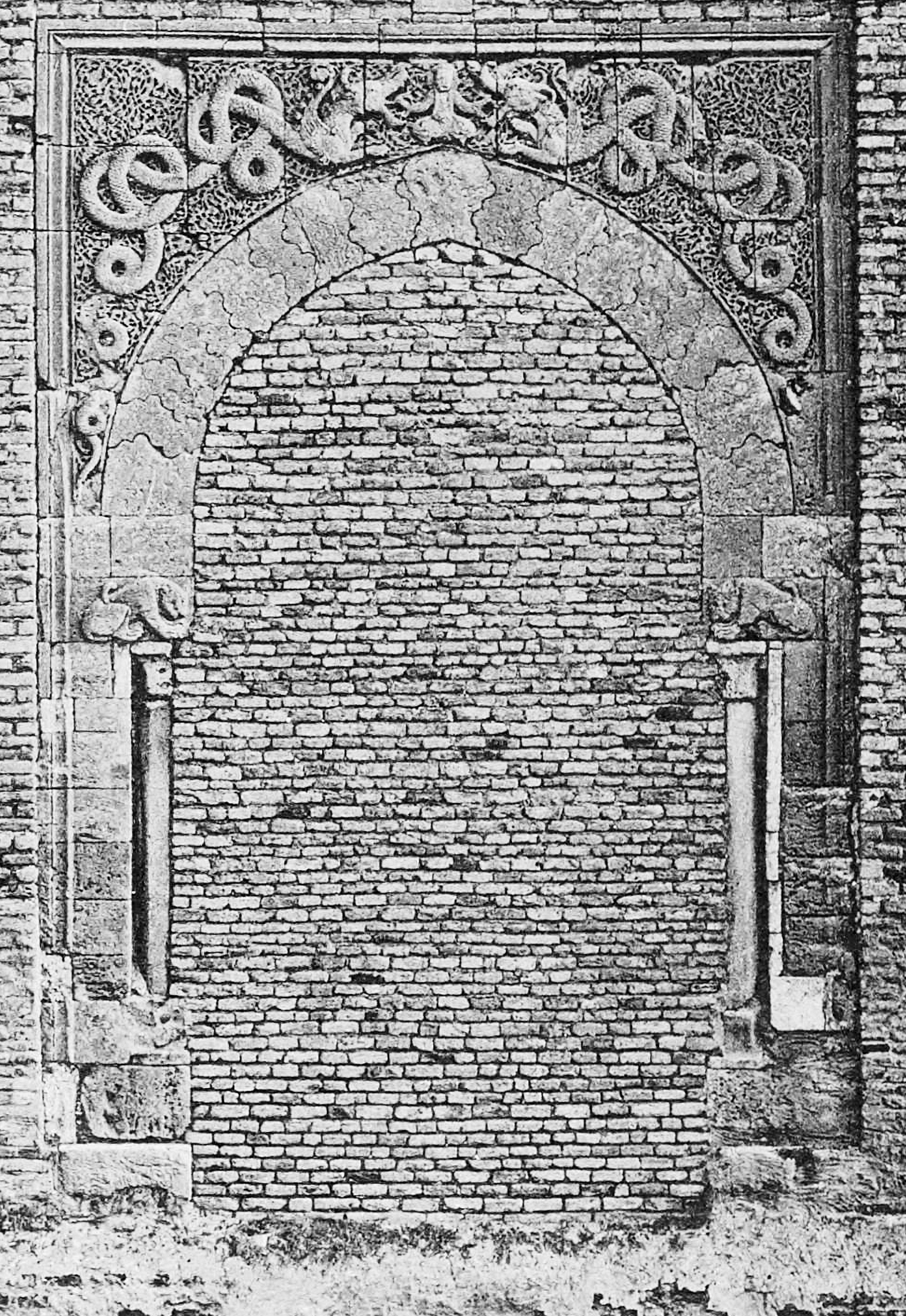
The entrance of the gate which was closed by Murad IV

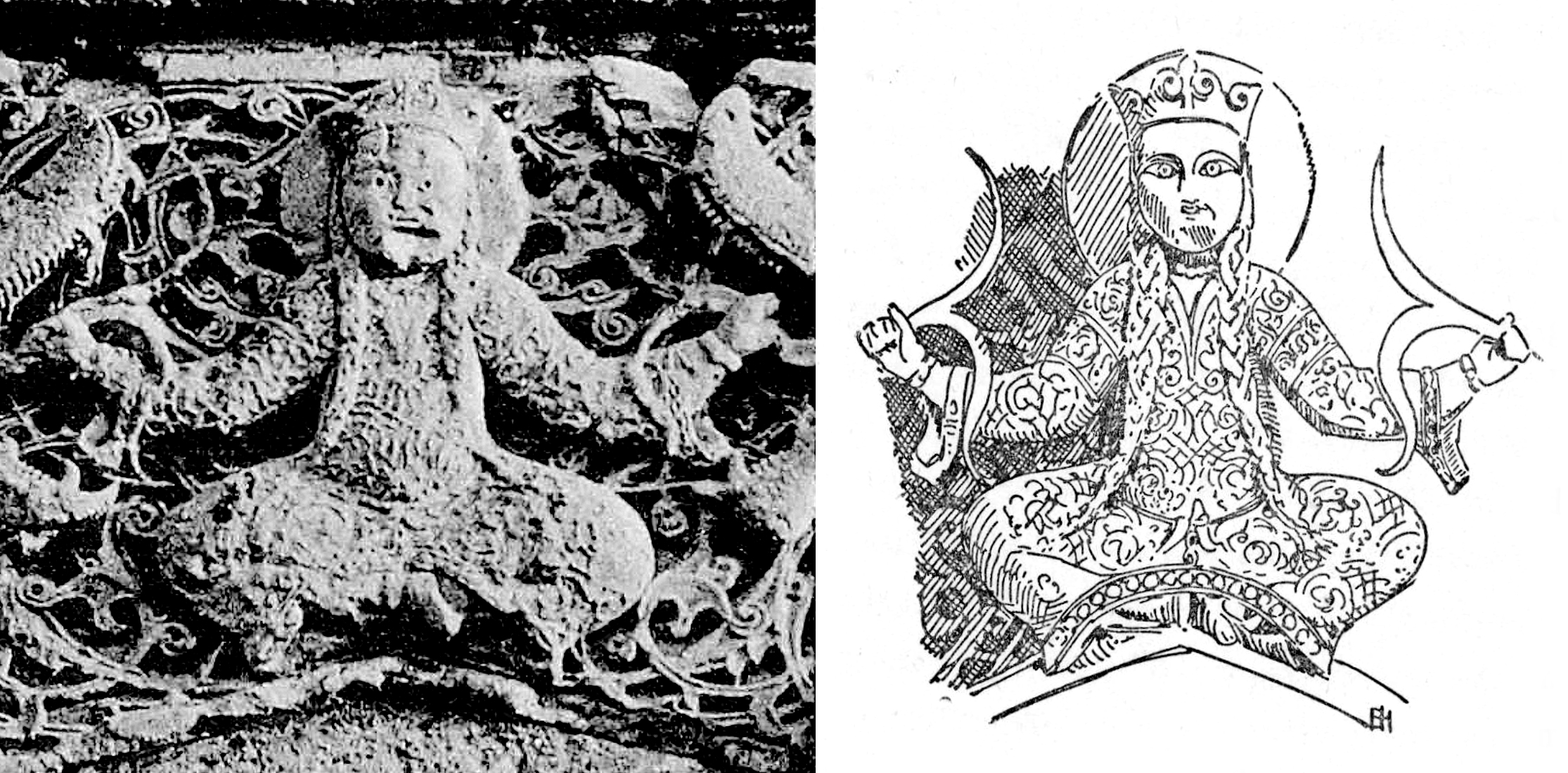
A recreation of the seated figure carved on the gate

== See also ==
- Bab al-Sheikh
- Bab al-Wastani
- Citadel of Aleppo
- Gates of Baghdad
