= Al-Nasir =

Abbasid Caliph in Baghdad (r. 1180–1225)

al-Nāṣir li-Dīn Allāh الناصر لدين الله
- Khalīfah; Amir al-Mu'minin
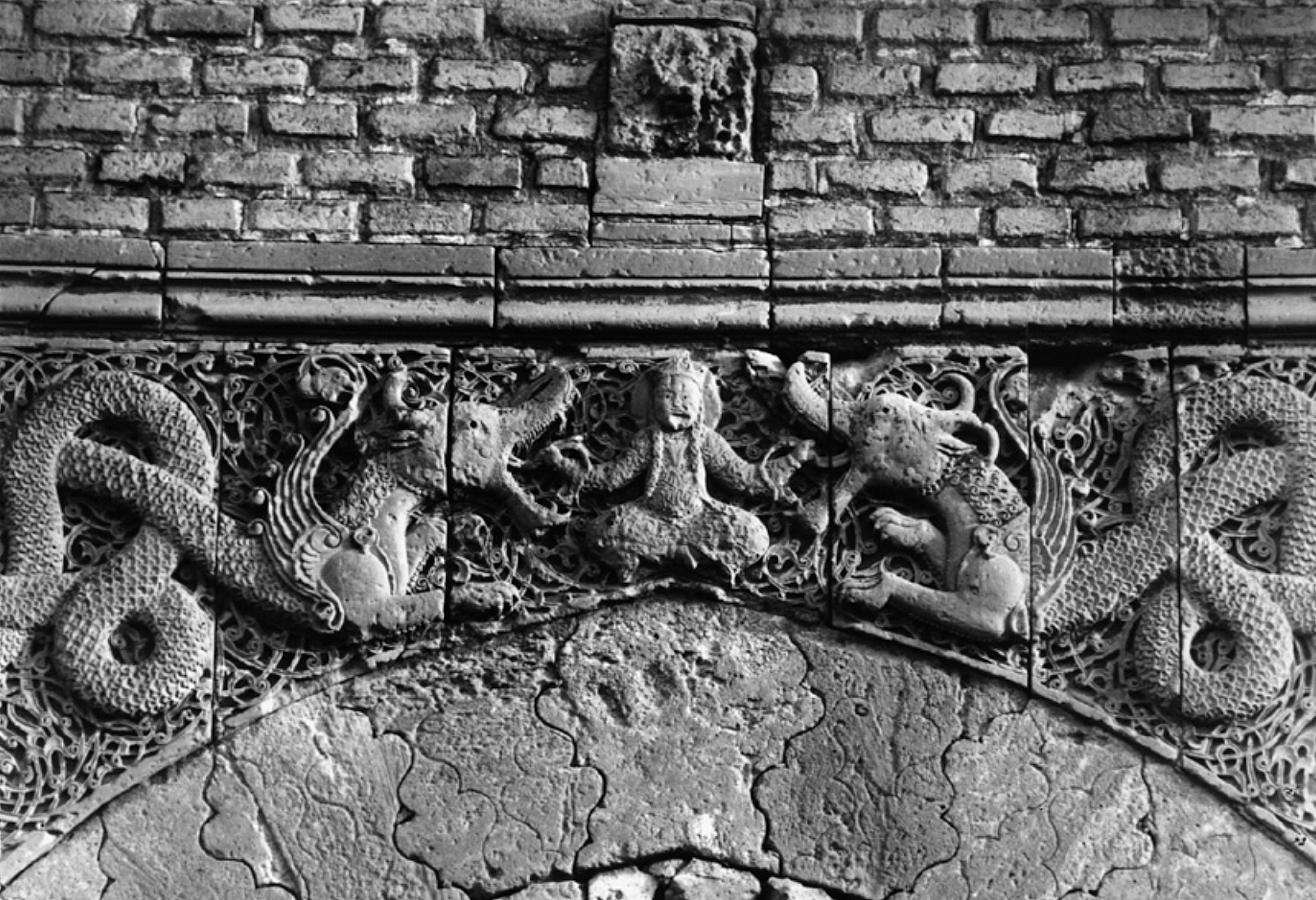
- Possible depiction of Al-Nasir holding two dragons, which could be a symbol of his victory of his two major enemies: the Grand Master of the Assassins, and the Khwarizmian Empire ruler Muhammad II. Baghdad, Bab al-Talsim, built circa 1221-22.

34th Caliph of the Abbasid Caliphate Abbasid Caliph in Baghdad
- Reign: 28 March 1180 – 5 October 1225
- Predecessor: al-Mustadi
- Successor: al-Zahir
- Born: 6 August 1158; Baghdad, Abbasid Caliphate
- Died: 5 October 1225 (aged 67); Baghdad, Abbasid Caliphate
- Consort: Seljuki Khatun; Asma; Bekçe
- Issue: al-Zahir; Malik al-Mu'azzam Abu'l-Hasan Ali
Names
- Abū al-ʿAbbās Aḥmad ibn al-Hasan al-Nāṣir li-Dīn Allāh
- Dynasty: Abbasid
- Father: al-Mustadi
- Mother: Zumurrud
- Religion: Sunni Islam

Abū al-ʿAbbās Aḥmad ibn al-Hasan al-Mustaḍīʾ (Arabic: أبو العباس أحمد بن الحسن المستضيء), better known by his laqab al-Nāṣir li-Dīn Allāh (الناصر لدين الله; 6 August 1158 – 5 October 1225) or simply as al-Nasir, was the Abbasid caliph in Baghdad from 1180 until his death. His laqab literally can mean The One who Gives Victory to the Religion of God. He continued the efforts of his grandfather al-Muqtafi in restoring the caliphate to its ancient dominant role and achieved a surprising amount of success as his army even conquered parts of Iran. According to the historian, Angelika Hartmann, al-Nasir was the last effective Abbasid caliph. He was able to gain full control over Mesopotamia after 200 years of nominal rule by the Abbasids since the overtake in 945 by the Shia Buyids and later the Seljuks.

In addition to his military success al-Nasir built many monuments in Baghdad that are still standing such as Bab al-Wastani gate, Abbasid Palace of Baghdad, Zumurrud Khatun Mausoleum, he also established the mosques of Al-Sarai and Hayder-Khana.

== Early life ==
Al-Nasir was the son of Caliph al-Mustadi and a Turkic umm walad called Zumurrud (Emerald). Al-Nasir was born during the last years of his great-grandfather Al-Muqtafi's reign. Ahmad was around two years old when his great-grandfather died and then his grandfather al-Mustanjid became caliph. His grandfather ruled from March 1160 to 18 December 1170 and he was successed by al-Mustadi. His father, al-Mustadi's reign was particularly notable for its extensive construction and development activities. He is reported to have rebuilt the al-Taj Palace in Baghdad, which had originally been constructed by the 10th-century Abbasid caliph (around 902–908). His reign also witnessed major construction projects involving mosques, schools, and religious endowments. His two spouses, Sayyida Banafsha and al-Nasir's mother Zumurrud, were especially active in supporting these initiatives. Banafsha, a follower of the Hanbali school of thought, ordered the construction of a bridge in Baghdad in 570 AH/1174 CE, which was subsequently named after her.

As a young prince Ahmad received good education in Baghdad along with his siblings. He also fathered some children. Ahmad had a half brother who was born to Sharaf. She was a Turkish, and was the mother of Abu Mansur Hashim ibn Hassan al-Mustadi. In 1180, Hashim tried to gather support for himself to become caliph, however he was unsuccessful and was easily overpowered by the new caliph.

== Reign ==
Al-Nasir came to power on the 28th March 1180. His reign was unusual for the rise of the futuwwa groups in his reign, connected to Baghdad's long-standing ayyarun. These urban social groups had long existed in Baghdad and elsewhere, and they were often involved in urban conflicts, especially sectarian riots. Al-Nasir made them into an instrument of his government, reorganizing them along Sufi lines and ideology. A testament to its rapid rise in influence over the region, The caliph al-Nasir approved of and supported futuwwa. In 1182, al-Nasir was initiated into the ranks of the futuwwa, donning their vestments and drinking salt water in the name of its head Shaykh. Over time, the Caliph would use futuwwa as a clever means of asserting caliphal power through religious hierarchy rather than regional power. He was particularly known to distribute the vestments of futuwwa to regional leaders in an assertion of his higher-rank. Though the original text of the Caliph's 1207 reform measures have been lost, reproductions describe an attempt at restructuring and institutionalizing futuwwa in a manner beneficial to Caliphal authority. One 1221 mission to Anatolia, for example, sought to propagate this reform to the Islamic frontier. Its contents include such measures as a strengthening of the important of the distribution of the trousers of futuwwa by the caliph and an assertion of Caliphal responsibility in protecting buildings of the futuwwa.

Ultimately, the Caliph's appropriation of futuwwa led to the flowering of literature regarding the institution. Instead of taming the brotherhoods into monolithic units of caliphal control, however, the reform measures spawned an unprecedented diversity of thought regarding the organizations, and new innovations and interpretations abounded. It continued for some time after the death of its founder. Al-Nasir's attempt to restructure the institution in a manner consolidating his control over Islamic society.

In the early years of his caliphate, his goal was to crush the Seljuq power and replace it with his own. He incited rebellion against the Seljuq Sultan of Persia, Toghrul III. The Khwarezm Shah, Ala ad-Din Tekish, at his instigation, attacked the Seljuq forces, and defeated them in 1194; Toghrul was killed and his head exposed in the caliph's palace. Tekish, recognized now as supreme ruler of the East, bestowed on the caliph certain provinces of Persia that had been held by the Seljuqs.

During the early years of al-Nasir's long reign, famous Islamic scholar Ibn al-Jawzi, who played an instrumental role in propagating the Hanbali school of orthodox Sunni jurisprudence in his native Baghdad. Initially maintained amicable relations with the state power by way of his friendship with the caliph's Hanbali vizier, Ibn Yūnus (d. 1197). However, after the latter's dismissal and arrest – for unknown reasons – the caliph appointed as his successor the Shia Ibn al-Ḳaṣṣāb (d. ca. 1250). Although the reasons for the matter remain unclear in the historical record, al-Nasir eventually sentenced Ibn al-Jawzi to live under house arrest for five years. One of the possible reasons for this may be that Ibn al-Jawzi's relationship with the caliph had soured after the scholar had written a direct refutation of the ruler's policy in a particular matter. After five years in exile, Ibn al-Jawzi was eventually set free due to the pleading of al-Nasir's mother, whom the various chronicles describe as "a very devout woman" who pleaded with her son to free the famous scholar. Soon after his return to Baghdad, however, Ibn al-Jawzi died, being seventy-four years old.

Al-Nasir maintain good relations with Muslim scholar and Sufi Shihab al-Din 'Umar al-Suhrawardi. From an early age onwards, Suhrawardi studied Islamic jurisprudence, law, logic, theology, Quranic studies and Hadith studies. Suhrawardi quickly excelled in his studies and mastered, at an early age, the Shafi'i and Hanbali school of thought. Suhrawardi was eventually designated as Shaykh al-Islam by al-Nasir.

Al-Nasir's mother Zumurrud died in December 1202–January 1203, or January–February 1203, and was buried in her own mausoleum in Sheikh Maarouf Cemetery. Her mausoleum is known as Zumurrud Khatun Mausoleum.

Al-Nasir sent his vizier to Tekish with some gifts, but the vizier irritated Tekish, who attacked the caliph's troops and routed them. Thereafter hostile relations prevailed for many years. The Caliph assassinated a governor of Tekish by using an Ismaili emissary. Tekish responded by having the body of al-Nasir's vizier, who died on a campaign against him, exhumed, and the head stuck up at Khwarizm. Irritated at this and other hostile acts, the Caliph retaliated by treating with indignity the pilgrims who came from the East under Khwarizm's flag. But beyond such poor revenge, he was powerless for any open enmity.

=== His support for Saladin ===
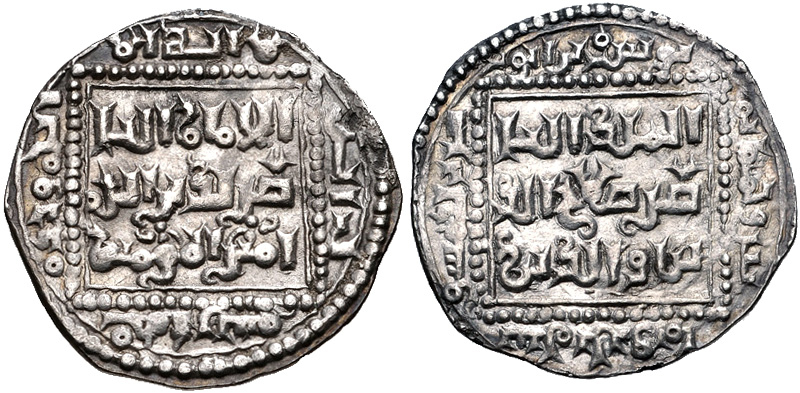
Dirham of Saladin, 583 AH (1187–88 CE). Obv.: "The Prince, Defender, Honor of the world [and] the faith"; in margin: "Yusuf bin Ayyub, Struck in Damascus, Year three and eighty and five hundred". Rev.:al-Nāṣir li-Dīn Allāh as Imam and Commander of the Faithful"; in margin: "There is no deity except God alone, Muhammad is the messenger of God".

When Saladin approached Mosul, he faced the issue of taking over a large city and justifying the action. The Zengids of Mosul appealed to caliph al-Nasir, whose vizier favored them. An-Nasir sent Badr al-Badr (a high-ranking religious figure) to mediate between the two sides. Saladin arrived at the city on 10 November 1182. Izz ad-Din would not accept his terms because he considered them disingenuous and extensive, and Saladin immediately laid siege to the heavily fortified city.

After several minor skirmishes and a stalemate in the siege that was initiated by the caliph, Saladin intended to find a way to withdraw without damage to his reputation while still keeping up some military pressure. He decided to attack Sinjar, which was held by Izz ad-Din's brother Sharaf ad-Din. It fell after a 15-day siege on 30 December. Saladin's soldiers broke their discipline, plundering the city; Saladin managed to protect the governor and his officers only by sending them to Mosul. After establishing a garrison at Sinjar, he awaited a coalition assembled by Izz ad-Din consisting of his forces, those from Aleppo, Mardin, and Armenia. Saladin and his army met the coalition at Harran in February 1183, but on hearing of his approach, the latter sent messengers to Saladin asking for peace. Each force returned to their cities and al-Fadil wrote: "They [Izz ad-Din's coalition] advanced like men, like women they vanished."

From the point of view of Saladin, in terms of territory, the war against Mosul was going well, but he still failed to achieve his objectives and his army was shrinking; Taqi ad-Din took his men back to Hama, while Nasir ad-Din Muhammad and his forces had left. This encouraged Izz ad-Din and his allies to take the offensive. The previous coalition regrouped at Harzam some 140 km from Harran. In early April, without waiting for Nasir ad-Din, Saladin and Taqi ad-Din commenced their advance against the coalition, marching eastward to Ras al-Ein unhindered. By late April, after three days of "actual fighting", according to Saladin, the Ayyubids had captured Amid. He handed the city to Nur ad-Din Muhammad together with its stores, which consisted of 80,000 candles, a tower full of arrowheads, and 1,040,000 books. In return for a diploma—granting him the city, Nur ad-Din swore allegiance to Saladin, promising to follow him in every expedition in the war against the Crusaders, and repairing the damage done to the city. The fall of Amid, in addition to territory, convinced Il-Ghazi of Mardin to enter the service of Saladin, weakening Izz ad-Din's coalition.

Saladin attempted to gain the Caliph an-Nasir's support against Izz ad-Din by sending him a letter requesting a document that would give him legal justification for taking over Mosul and its territories. Saladin aimed to persuade the caliph claiming that while he conquered Egypt and Yemen under the flag of the Abbasids, the Zengids of Mosul openly supported the Seljuks (rivals of the caliphate) and only came to the Caliph when in need. He also accused Izz ad-Din's forces of disrupting the Muslim "Holy War" against the Crusaders, stating "they are not content not to fight, but they prevent those who can". Saladin defended his own conduct claiming that he had come to Syria to fight the Crusaders, end the heresy of the Assassins, and stop the wrong-doing of the Muslims. He also promised that if Mosul was given to him, it would lead to the capture of Jerusalem, Constantinople, Georgia, and the lands of the Almohads in the Maghreb, "until the word of God is supreme and the Abbasid caliphate has wiped the world clean, turning the churches into mosques". Saladin stressed that all this would happen by the will of God, and instead of asking for financial or military support from the Caliph, he would capture and give the Caliph the territories of Tikrit, Daquq, Khuzestan, Kish Island, and Oman.

=== Abbasid–Ayyubid control over Hejaz ===
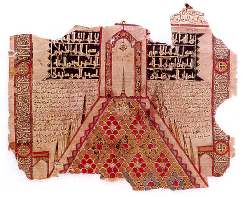
Ayyubid Block printed illustrated Hajj certificate from 1220-1221, mentioning al-Nasir as Amir al-Mu'minin in the black banners flanking the dome of Arafat

The Abbasid caliphs maintained control and hegemony over Mecca and Medina through Ayyubid sultans, since the foundation of Ayyubid rule. Around 1190s, According to the contemporary Muslim chronicler Ibn al-Athir, one Ayyubid governor of Yemen Tughtakin ibn Ayyub attempted to wrest control of Mecca, but after protests from the caliph al-Nasir, Saladin intervened and prevented Tughtakin ibn Ayyub from seizing the city. Ibn al-Athir wrote that Tughtakin was "a stern ruler, harsh to his subjects, one who used to buy merchants' goods for himself and sell them at whatever price he wished".

In 1200-01, the dignitaries of Mecca chose Qatada ibn Idris, one of their own, to rule in Mikhtar's place. Qatada was recognized by the Ayyubid sultan of Egypt, al-Kamil, as the emir (prince) of Mecca. After gaining control over the Emirate of Mecca, Qatadah extended his influence to Medina and Ta'if, and parts of Najd and Yemen. He maintained a garrisoned fortress in Yanbu which made it possible to exact a good share of the profits of the Red Sea trade as it stopped at this port before proceeding to Egypt.

Qatada's actions troubled the Abbasid caliph in Baghdad, the Ayyubid sultan in Cairo, and the Ayyubid emir in Yemen. Challenges from those authorities coincided with the annual Hajj pilgrim caravan to Mecca. Accordingly, caravans from Cairo, Baghdad, and Damascus were accompanied by whatever number of troops the caliph or sultan deemed necessary to deliver a message to Qatada. In 1212, an assassination attempt on Qatada occurred during the Hajj. Qatada suspected the Abbasids were responsible and ordered his Nubian slave troops to attack the Baghdadi caravan, although they had already fled to join the Damascene caravan where they gained protection from Saladin's mother. Qatada demanded a compensation of 100,000 dinars for calling off the attack on the caravan, but when Saladin's mother could only raise 30,000 dinars, Qatada desisted nonetheless. However, he also promised to kill any pilgrim coming from Baghdad during the following year.

=== Collision with Alā al-Din Muhammad ===
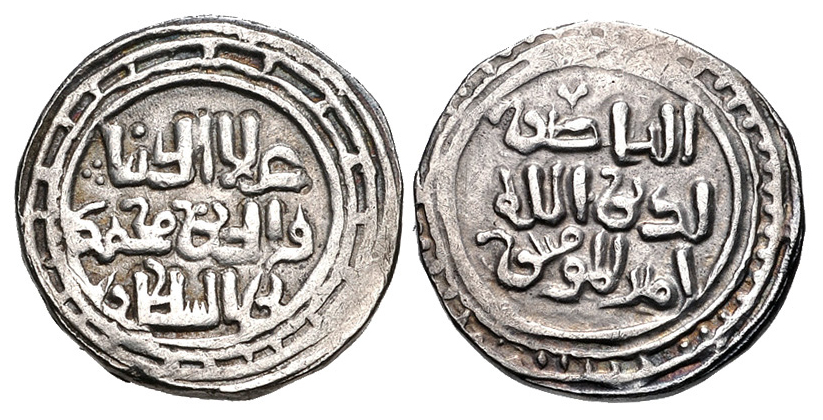
A silver coin of 'Ala al-Din Muhammad citing caliph al-Nasir and minted in the newly conquered Ghazni city, the capital of Ghurid dynasty.

Tekish's son, Alā' al-Din Muhammad II began to gather a large army; diplomatic overtures had been exchanged in the past and the khutba had always been read in the Caliph's name, but Muhammad began finding ways to justify this attack. Firstly, al-Nasir had sent Ismaili assassins against a brother of the Sharif of Mecca's brother, and secondly, due to the cruel against perpetrated by the Caliph and harassment of Khwarazmian pilgrims on hajj. A final envoy named, a Qadi named Mujir ad-Din 'Umar ibn Sa'd al-Khorezmi was sent to Baghdad to demand recognizing Muhammad's power as Sultan, but it was rejected, and when al-nasir found out the Khwarazmians were at Hamadan with an army of 150,000 cavalry and 100,000 foot soldiers (upon Muhammad's inspection in 1218) and an additional force of 100,000 haras mamluks, al-Nasir sent a Sufi named Shihab ad-Din as-Suhrawardi, warning him against attacking with a hadith, but Muhammad rebuffed this.

Muhammad arrested as-Suhrawardi convened with various imams and members of the ulama, and proclaimed 'Ala al-Mulk at-Tirmidhi, a Shi'ite descendant of Ali as caliph. Muhammad reached the Asadabad Pass where he planned to invade Iraq, sending an emir forward with 15,000 to be the fief of Hulwan. Once the Khwarazmian army had gathered at Asadabad, however, a snowstorm occurred that made the endeavor untenable. Muhammad was forced to leave, pursued by Parcham and Hakkar Kurdish tribesmen. Muhammad released as-Suhrawardi and postponed the invasion with continued enmity to the Caliph.

In February 1218 he arrived in Merv and removed the Caliph's name from the Khutba, followed by Balkh, Bukhara and Sarakhs. Muhammad left Gurganj and the main court to be governed by his mother and moved the capital to Samarkand that year, where he chose to reside. Terken Khatun resided in Gurganj where she had exploited court intrigue to rival Muhammad's court, while, to the dismay of his eldest son Jalal al-Din Mangburni, Muhammad proclaimed his younger son Qutb ad-Din Ozlagh-Shah as his successor, a decision influenced by Terken Khatun as Ozlagh-Shah's mother came from the same Kipchak tribe as her, while Jalal al-Din's mom, Ay-Chichek, did not.

Jalal al-Din was appointed in command of the former Ghurid territories apart from Herat, while Muhammad's youngest son received Khorasan and Mazandaran. Terken Khatun made Muhammad do other things such as appointing one of her former ghulams, Muhammad bin Salih (given the title Nizam al-Mulk) as his vizier, and the deposition of the leader of the Burhanids and replacement with Nizam al-Mulk's brother. Muhammad only retained support from his Turkic mercenaries, but he grew alienated by his mother's domineering posture, so he sent a courtier named Izz ad-Din Toghrul to Gurganj to behead the Nizam al-Mulk, but Terken Khatun arrested him, and eventually Muhammad relented. Muhammad demonstrated his lack of domestic capability when he appointed six vakils in his court and did not add a new vizier to rule, resulting in a significantly weaker bureaucracy.

=== Short-lived incorporation of Ismaili faith into mainstream Islam ===
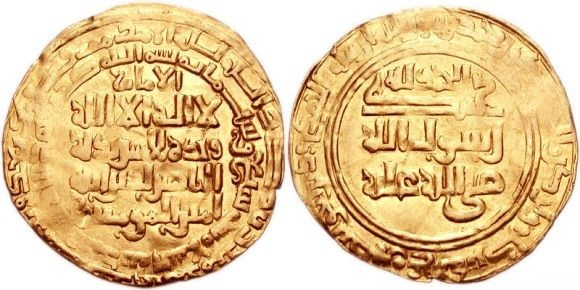
Gold dinar of al-Nasir minted in 607 AH

Al-Nasir's policies towards Ismaili shias were somehow successful to a great level. Jalāl al-Din Hasan had converted to Sunni Islam, which was accepted by caliph al-Nasir and other Muslim princes and he became known as naw musalman (Persian: نومسلمان, "Muslim convert"). He repudiated the faith and policies associated with earlier Lords of Alamut and went so far as to curse his ancestors and burn the books of Hasan ibn Sabah. He invited many Sunni scholars and jurists from across Khurasan, Qazvin and al-Iraq to visit Alamut Castle, and even invited them to inspect the library and remove any books they found to be objectionable. He also instructed these scholars to teach his followers, whom he commanded to observe the Sunni Sharia.

During his lifetime, he maintained friendly relations with the caliph al-Nasir. An alliance with the caliph meant greater resources for the self-defence of not only the Nizārī Ismā'īlī state, but also the broader Muslim world. He also personally led his army to assist Uzbek, ruler of the Eldiguzids, against a rebel.

Jalāl al-Din Hasan died in 1221, possibly the result of poisoning. He was married to four Sunni women from the daughters of the princes of Gilan, after he sought the princes' permission, who then asked the Abbasid Caliph, who approved. They, along with some of Ḥassan III's kinsfolk, including his sister, were executed by his son's vizier under allegations of poisoning Ḥassan III.

Jalāl al-Din Hasan's Sunni conformity was gradually reversed and his community increasingly regarded itself openly as Ismaili Shiite during the Imamate of his only surviving son and successor, ʻAlāʼ ad-Dīn Muḥammad III, who succeeded him at the age of 9 years old. However, his son upon succession was initially too young, so Ḥassan III's regent controlled the state. In later years, Nizari community interpreted Jalāl al-Din Hasan's conversion as an act of taqiyya.

== Policies and events ==
During the caliphate of al-Nasir several important political changes, incidents and developments took place. He also took part in them directly and sometimes indirectly.

=== Events between 1187 and 1190 ===
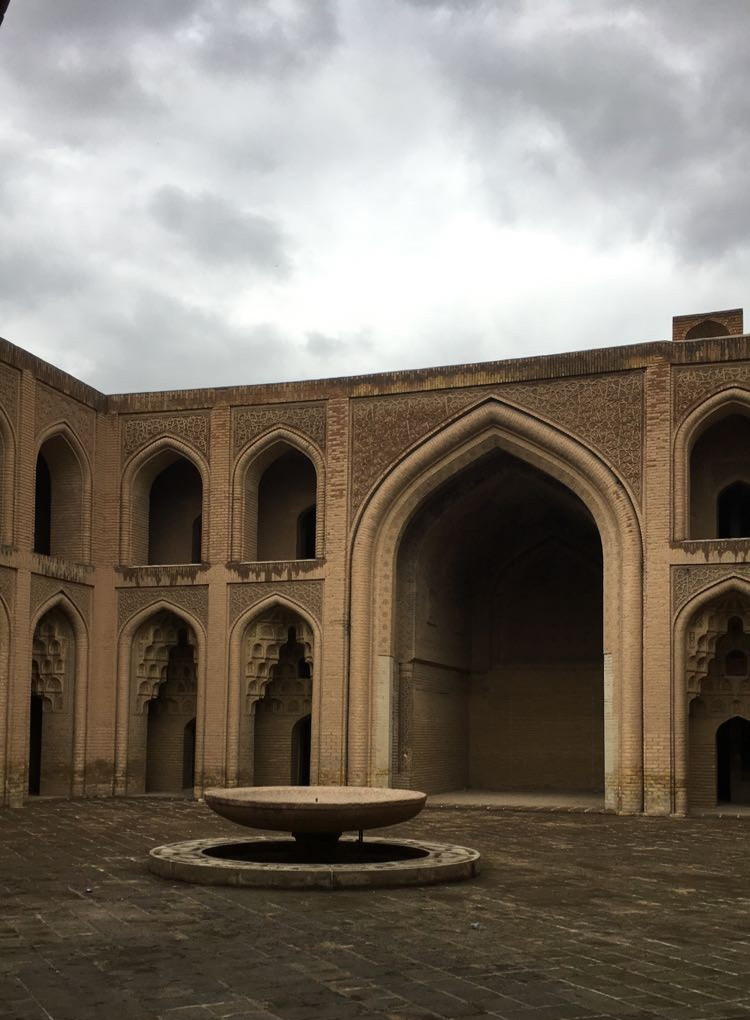
The Abbasid Palace in Baghdad is attributed to al-Nasir

In 1186 a conflict broke between sultan Toghrul III and Qizil Arslan. This conflict possibly prevented Toghrul III and Qizil Arslan from aiding Muhammad b. Bahram Shah, the last Seljuk Sultan of Kirman, who had been driven from Kirman by Oghuz rebels driven out from Khurasan in 1186

The rebel army consisted of the forces of the Amirs of Zenjan and Maragha, the retainers of both Kamal Ai-Aba, head of the Mamluks, and of Saif al-Din Rus, husband of Innach Khatun, while Toghrul himself received significant support from Turkmens, and their combined army forced Qizil Arslan to leave Hamadan after some clashes. Toghrul undertook two diplomatic ventures in 1187, he journeyed to Mazandaran to request aid from Bavandid Husam al-Daula Ardashir, and received troops from him, and Toghrul also sent messages to al-Nasir, asking him to restore the palace of the Seljuk Sultan in Baghdad for him, but the Caliph razed the palace and then sent aid to Qizil Arslan, who agreed to become the Caliph's vassal. The Caliph sent an army numbering 15,000 under his vizier Jalal al-Din 'Ubaidallah b. Yunus, which attacked Hamadan in 1188 without waiting for Qizil Arslan's army to arrive, he was defeated and captured, Toghrul secured victory by charging the enemy center after his right wing was battered, but this was a Pyrrhic victory, as Toghrul's army suffered grievous losses in the battle. The Sultan next tried to reform his administration and coordinate strategy with available resources, but his rash behavior regarding a dispute over the command of the army, led to the execution of Kamal Ai-Aba, Saifuddin Rus and several of the Sultan's opponents, and the desertion of his allies.

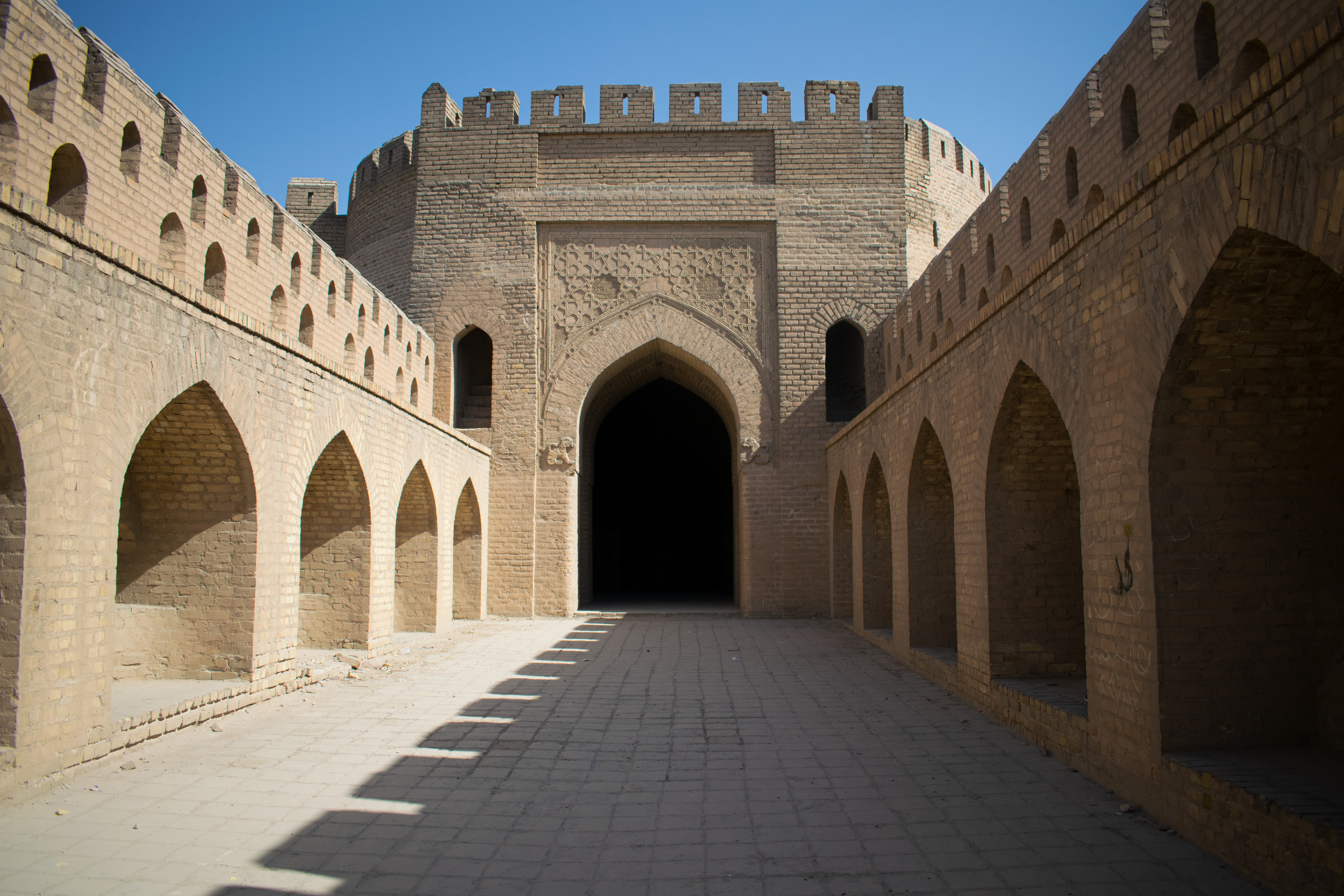
Bab al-Wastani built in 1121 by al-Nasir is the only surviving historic gate of Baghdad

Qizil Arslan had declared Sanjar b. Suleiman-Shah as the Seljuk Sultan of Iraq, and reinforced by troops sent by the Caliph now invaded Hamadan, Toghrul, unable to resist the invasion, first retreated to Isphahan, then to Urmia. He was joined by an army led by his brother in law Hasan Kipchiq, and Toghrul also tried to get help from the Ayyubids and the Caliph, even sent his infant son as hostage to Baghdad in a futile gesture. Toghrul invaded Azerbaijan and sacked the towns of Ushnu, Khoy, Urmiya and Salmas. Qizil Arslan reconciled with his nephews and defeated and captured Toghrul when he again invaded Azerbaijan in 1190. Qizli Arslan imprisoned Toghrul and his son Malik Shah in Kuhran fortress near Tabriz. Qizil Arslan, encouraged by the Caliph, soon declared himself Sultan, married Innach Khatun, his brother's widow, and was poisoned by her in September, 1191. His nephews began to rule independently, and one of the Mamluks of Jahan Pahalvan, Mahmud Anas Oglu, freed Toghrul III from his prison in May 1192.

=== Events of 1192–1194 ===
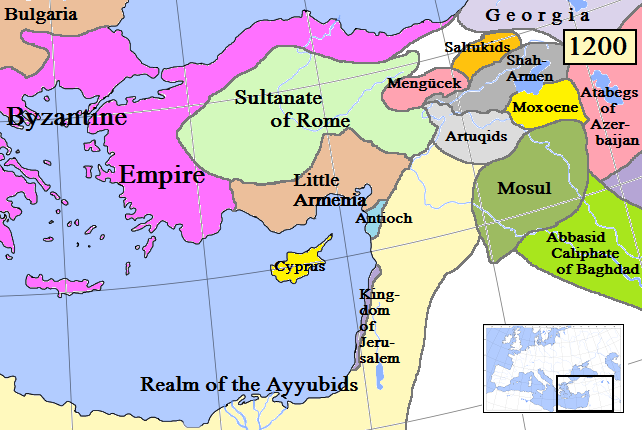
Map of late 12th/ early 13th-century Abbasid caliphate and its ally states

Toghrul eluded the pursuers sent by Abu Bakr and quickly assembled an army from his supporters and Turkmens, then marched east and defeated the army of Qutlugh Inanch Muhammad and Amir Amiran Umar near Qazvin on June 22, 1192, and won over a large part of the enemy soldiers after his victory. Qutlug-Inach and Amiran Omar then attacked Abu Bakr in Azerbaijan and was beaten, Aimiran Umar sought refuge with his father in law Shirvanshah Akhsitan I (c.1160-1196), while Qutlug-Inach moved to Rey. Toghrul occupied Hamadan, secured the treasury and came to rule over Isphahan and Jibal, but did not attempt to negotiate an agreement with Abu Bakr, against Qutlug Innach. Qutlugh Innach now appealed to Khwarazmshah Ala ad-Din Tekish for aid, and Tekish invaded and captured Rey in 1192, forcing Qutlug Innach to flee the city.

=== Toghrul's Truce with Tekish ===
Sultan Toghrul III opened negotiations with Tekish, and eventually agreed to become a vassal of Khwarizm, marriage of his daughter The Tekish's son Yunus Khan, and in return Tekish kept Rey, garrisoned his newly acquired territory, collected taxes, then installed Tamghach as the governor, and returned home to quell the rebellion of his brother Sultan Shah. Toghrul now had the chance to negotiate with the Atabeg of Yazd, Langar ibn Wardanruz, or the Salghurid ruler of Fars, Degle ibn Zangi, both were nominally loyal to the Seljuks but no initiatives were taken to unite against their common enemy.

=== Breaking of Truce and War declaration of Tekish and al-Nasir ===
Toghrul felt threatened with the presence of a hostile force in Rey, which was a strategic town commanding communication with Jibal and Azerbaijan was unacceptable to the Sultan. The Sultan marched towards Rey with his available forces in March 1193, defeated and killed Tamghach, captured Rey and drove out the Khrarizmian forces from the province. Toghrul III next married Innach Khatun, mother of Qutlug Innach and Amirin Umar, as part of the peace agreement on her request, however, she was executed after the discovery of a plot to poison the Sultan. The Sultan returned to Hamadan, Qutlug Innach fled to Zanjan, from where he sent messages to Tekish, and al-Nasir also asked the Tekish to move against Toghrul. Toghrul again moved east in 1194 and defeated Qutlug Innach in battle despite the presence of 7,000 Khwarazmian troops aiding Qutlug Innach. Qutlug Innach and other survivors moved east and joined up with the main Khwarizmian army led by Shah Tekish at Semnan.

Tughril was defeated in the battle of Ray by Tekish with the help of al-Nasir. Ala ad-Din Tekish sent Toghrul's head to al-Nasir who displayed it at the Nubi Gate in front of his palace, while his body was hanged at Rey.

=== Policies between 1214 to 1217 and al-Nasir's rejection of Khwarezmid's claim ===
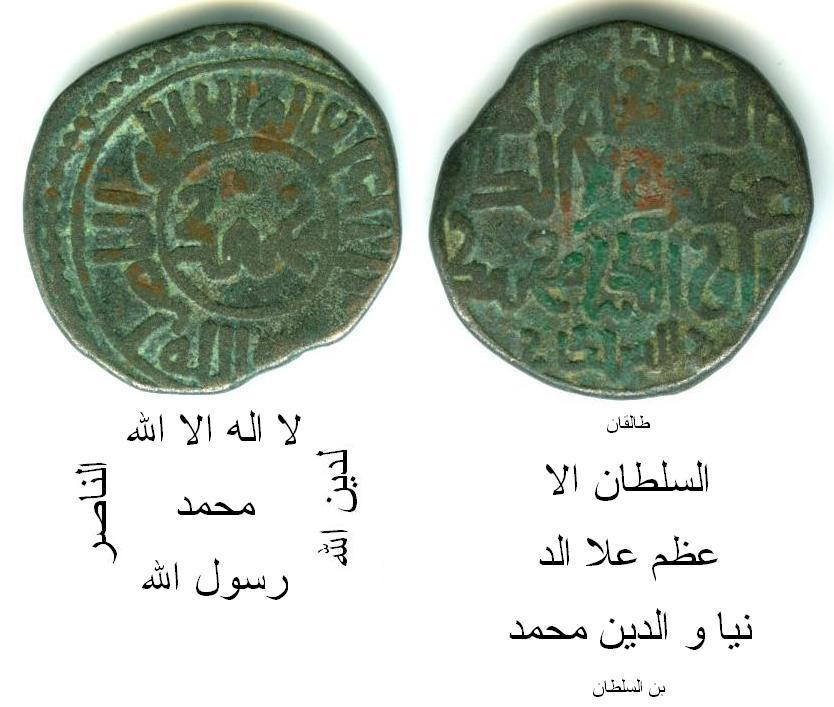
A copper coin minted in the name of Muhammad II (1200–1220) of Khwarezm, citing caliph al-Nasir as nominal suzerain.

In 1214–1215, Alā' al-Din Muhammad dispatched an army under Taj ad-Din Abu Bakr of Zuzan, who attacked Kerman that had been seized by Oghuz Turks. They succeeded in capturing all of their important cities including Bam, Kerman, Bardshir and Jiroft among others. Abu Bakr then moved south where conquered all of Makran and reached as far as Sindh on the eastern frontier, and received the submission of the ruler of Hormuz named Malank after defeating him in battle and large parts of Oman, who wanted to avoid conflict. The khutba was read in Muhammad's name in Qalhat and likely the territories close to Hormuz on the Arabian side too. Meanwhile, in Persian Iraq, Aydughmish had been defeated and killed by a rival Eldizugid mamluk named Nasir ad-Din Mengli, who had seized control of the region and sent threatening letters to the caliph al-Nasir.

He then offered a marriage alliance with the sister of the dead Rustam V of the Bavandids, which was rejected; she went to Muhammad's court instead and married to a Khwarazmian emir, securing Mazandaran. Mankli was later killed by a coalition of Caliphal troops, Nizari Ismailis and another Eldiguzid mamluk named Uzbek; who assigned a governor named Sayf ad-Din Oghlamish in his lands, who was pro-Khwarazmian; he controlled all of Persian Iraq apart from Zanjan and Abhar, which was given to the Ismailis. He was later assassinated by a fida'i sent by Jalal ad-Din Hasan of the Ismailis in correspondence with the al-Nasir.

In November–December 1215, Muhammad went to Afghanistan where he captured Bamyan, Firuzkuh, and all Ghurid territories in the region apart from those controlled by Taj ad-Din Yildiz, who Muhammad demanded to submit and read the khutba in his name. Yildiz convened with his viziers and agreed to these terms, but the governor of Ghazna, Qutlugh Takin then opened secret correspondence with Muhammad and offered to surrender the city. Sometime in 1216–1217, while Yildiz was on a hunting trip, Muhammad attacked Ghazni and crushed the Ghurid garrison there, but he then executed Qutlugh Takin and stole his property and fortunes. Muhammad left a son of his, Jalal al-Din, in Ghazni while Yildiz fled to Lahore, and then to India, where he would be killed fighting Iltutmish of the Delhi Sultanate. According to the source, Muhammad pushed his borders as far east as some stretches of the Indus River, right next to India.

In 1217–1218, Muhammad II embarked on yet another ambitious campaign into "The Uplands"; otherwise western and northwestern Iran. After the death of Ighlamish, Persian Iraq lacked a cohesive authority and was divided loosely amongst the Ismailis, Eldiguzids and Salgurids, so Muhammad leveraged this and captured Rayy with an enormous army of 100,000, but before he could even leave the city was met with the army of Salgurid atabeg of Fars, Sa'd ibn Dakala, who did not realize the Khwarazmian army was there and attacked the Khwarazmian advance guard near Khayl-i Buzurg outside Rayy, almost routing it before Muhammad arrived and defeated Sa'd's army. Sa'd was captured and Muhammad initially wanted to execute him, but had him pardoned if he became a vassal upon the pleading of Abu Bakr of Zuzan; he ceded the fortresses of Istakhr and Ashkanavan, as well as two thirds of his treasury and got to return to Fars.

The Eldiguzid atabeg, Uzbek ibn Pahlawan, was in Isfahan at this time, was forced to retreat westwards to fortify himself upon the advice of his vizier Rabib ad-Din Dandan in Farrazin. Muhammad took advantage of this to take all of Persian Iraq, first Saveh, and then Qazvin, Zanjan, Abhar (from the Ismailis), and Hamadan and Isfahan with minimal resistance. Muhammad then met an Eldizugid army under the ruler of Ahar, Nusrat ad-Din Pish-Tegin who was hiding in the mountains of Azerbaijan, and defeated them in battle, taking both Nusrat and vizier Rabib as prisoner.

Muhammad sent an envoy named Nasir ad-Din Dawlatyar to request the atabeg's surrender, where an agreement was finally reached and the khutba was read in Muhammad's name and Farrazin was ceded. Muhammad also took Qom and Kashan and by late 1217, he controlled all of Persian Iraq, with Arran, Azerbaijan, and Derbent being his vassals. Uzbek requested help from Muhammad against the Georgians, who had been raiding his lands, so Muhammad gathered a force of 50,000, but no campaign occurred after some diplomacy where a Khwarazmian envoy brought back gifts, but Muhammad maintained his intention to jihad and switched priority to defeating the Caliph al-Nasir, who had repeatedly fought back against Khwarazmian influence.

By 1217, Muhammad had conquered all the lands from the river Jaxartes to the Gulf. He declared himself shah and demanded formal recognition from the caliph. When the caliph al-Nasir rejected his claim, Ala ad-Din Muhammad gathered an army and marched towards Baghdad to depose al-Nasir. However, when crossing the Zagros Mountains, the shah's army was caught in a blizzard. Thousands of warriors died. With the army decimated, the generals had no choice but to return home.

== Family ==
Al-Nasir had one main wife called Seljuki, When she returned to her home after the Hajj in 580 AH (1184/85). Only a year and a half later did the Caliph propose marriage to her, and they became engaged. Al-Nasir sent an honourable escort for her. She arrived in Baghdad, where the marriage was concluded, and the Caliph presented her with jewels “worthy of caliphs and rulers”. The Caliph loved her deeply. She wished for a palace like the one in Akhlat, and he instructed his vizier to build one. The palace was constructed by two hundred architects and two thousand workers. Doors from old palaces and trees from the gardens of old palaces were brought there. The marriage was particularly significant because it was concluded without any political motives.

Soon after the palace was completed, Seljuk Khatun died. The Caliph was deeply saddened by her death and mourned his wife for three days. According to Ibn al-Sa'i, the Caliph “could neither eat nor drink for several days”. According to Ibn al-Jawzi, “condolences were received for three days; the vizier, nobles, military commanders, and scholars were present”. Ibn al-Sa'i, Ibn al-Athir, and Ibn al-Jawzi dated her death to 2 Rabi' al-Akhir 584 AH (6 June 1188). During her lifetime, she began building a mausoleum for herself near the landing place in Karkh, beside the shrine of Awn and Mu'in, descendants of Ali. The site is now known as the Mausoleum of Zubayda and is located near the Basra Gate, but she did not live to see the mausoleum completed. She was buried there, and the caliph later completed her mausoleum. Nearby, he built the famous ribat known as “al-Ramla”, where a library was established. Al-Nasir donated numerous income-producing properties to support the ribat and her mausoleum. Alms were distributed annually to pilgrims in her name. According to Ibn al-Sa'i, “for many years, her house remained exactly as it had been, with all its draperies and furniture; it was never opened, and nothing was taken from it”. Later, the Caliph ordered the palace built for her to be demolished and its garden destroyed.

Al-Nasir also had another wife or concubine named Asma, who was the mother of his son, Muhammad (future al-Zahir). He had other children including Abu al-Hasan Ali ibn al-Nasir who was also known with the laqab Malik al-Mu'azzam.

== Death ==
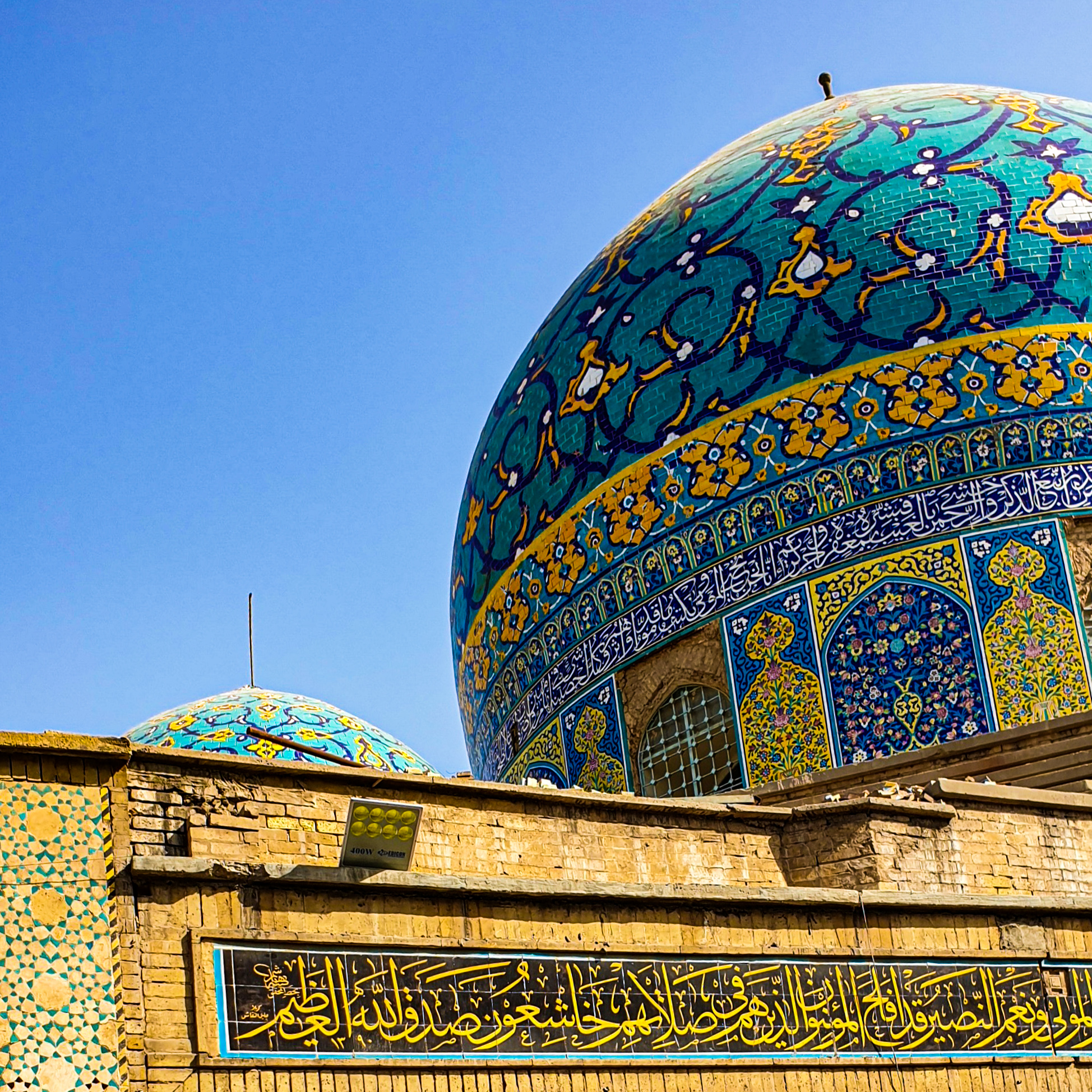
Haydar-Khana Mosque

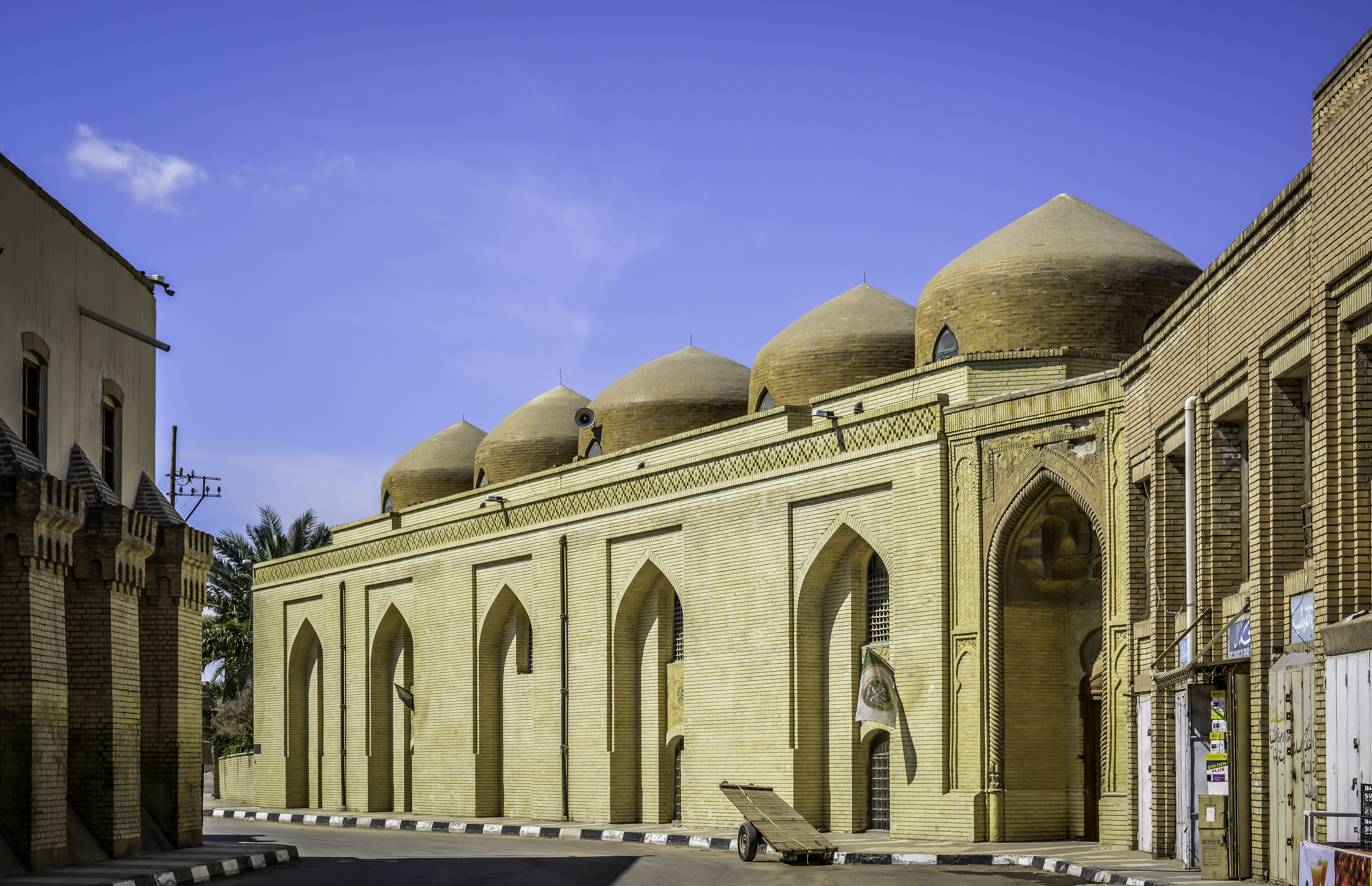
Al-Sarai Mosque

Mosques established by al-Nasir in Baghdad

Al-Nasir spent his last three years paralysed and nearly blind. He suffered from dysentery for twenty days and then died. Al-Nāṣir had originally named his eldest son Muḥammad as his successor in 585 AH (1189). He later changed his decision in favour of his younger son, ʿAli (also known as Malik al-Mu'azzam and Abu'l-Hasan Ali). However, ʿAli died in 612 AH (1215–1216), leaving Muḥammad as the only surviving male heir. Muḥammad was consequently restored as heir-apparent, and the people were again required to give him the oath of allegiance. He was succeeded by his son al-Zahir in the year 1225 as the thirty-fifth Abbasid caliph. His son ruled for a short period, al-Zahir lowered the taxes, and built a strong army to resist invasions. He died on 10 July 1226, nine months after his accession. Al-Zahir was succeeded his son (al-Nasir's grandson) al-Mustansir.

== See also ==
- al-Sarai Mosque
- Baghdad School also known as the Arab school was an influential school of Islamic art developed during the late 12th century in the Abbasid capital Baghdad.

== Sources ==
- Bosworth, C. E. (1968). "The Political and Dynastic History of the Iranian World (A.D. 1000–1217)". In Boyle, John Andrew (ed.). The Cambridge History of Iran: The Saljuq and Mongol Periods. Vol. 5. Cambridge: Cambridge University Press. pp. 1–202. ISBN 0-521-06936-X.
- Lane-Poole, Stanley (1906). Saladin and the Fall of the Kingdom of Jerusalem. Heroes of the Nations. London: G. P. Putnam's Sons.
- Buniyatov, Z.M. (2015). A History of The Khorezmian State under the Anushteginids 1097 – 1231. IICAS Samarkand. ISBN 978-9943-357-21-1.
- Hanne, Eric J. (2007). Putting the Caliph in His Place: Power, Authority, and the Late Abbasid Caliphate. Madison, New Jersey: Fairleigh Dickinson University Press. ISBN 978-0-8386-4113-2.
- Hitti, Philip K. (1970). History of The Arabs (10th ed.). The Mcmillan Press Ltd., London. ISBN 0-333-09871-4.
- Peacock, A.C.S.; Yıldız, Sara Nur, eds. (2013). The Seljuks of Anatolia: Court and Society in the Medieval Middle East. I.B.Tauris. ISBN 978-1848858879.
- Zaporozhets, V. M (2012). The Seljuks. Döring, Hanover. ISBN 978-3925268441.
- Zardabli, Ismail B. (2014). The History of Azerbaijan. Rossendale Books, London. ISBN 978-1-291-97131-6.
- This text is partly adapted from William Muir's public domain, The Caliphate: Its Rise, Decline, and Fall.
- Hartmann, Angelika. An-Nasir li-Din Allah: Politik, Religion und Kultur in der späten Abbasidenzeit.
- Budak Yusuf (2023). "Bir Selçuklu Hâtununun Biyografisi: Selçuk Hâtun". Eurasian Academy of Sciences Social Sciences Journal (45): 56–63. doi:10.17740/eas.soc.2022.V45-04. ISSN 2149-1348.
- ʻIzz al-Dīn Ibn al-Athīr (1965). الكامل في التاريخ. Vol. 9, 10. Dar Ṣáder.
- Le Strange, Guy (1900). Baghdad During the Abbasid Caliphate: From Contemporary Arabic and Persian Sources. Clarendon Press.
- Bar Hebraeus (1932). Chronography. Translated by E. A. Wallis Budge. Gorgias Press.
- Turan, O. (1971). Selçuklular Zamanında Türkiye. Istanbul: Turan Neşriyat Yurdu. pp. 112–147.
- Ibn al-Sāʿī (2017). Consorts of the Caliphs: Women and the Court of Baghdad. Translated by Shawkat M. Toorawa and the Editors of the Library of Arabic Literature. Introduction by Julia Bray. Foreword by Marina Warner. New York: New York University Press. ISBN 978-1-4798-0477-1.
- Lyons, Malcolm Cameron; Jackson, D. E. P. (1982). Saladin: The Politics of the Holy War. Cambridge: Cambridge University Press. ISBN 0521317398.
- Salibi, Kamal S. (1998), The Modern History of Jordan, I.B.Tauris, ISBN 978-1-86064-331-6
- Richards, Donald S. (2010), The Chronicle of Ibn al-Athir for the Crusading Period from al-Kamil fi'l-Ta'rikh. Part 3, Ashgate Publishing, ISBN 9780754669524
- Peters, Francis E. (1994), Mecca: a Literary History of the Muslim Holy Land, Princeton University Press, ISBN 978-0-691-03267-2

Al-Nasir Abbasid dynasty Born: 6 August 1158 Died: 5 October 1225
Sunni Islam titles
Preceded by al-Mustadi	Caliph of Islam; Abbasid Caliph; 28 March 1180 – 5 October 1225	Succeeded by al-Zahir
