= Shihab al-Din 'Umar al-Suhrawardi =

Persian Muslim scholar (c. 1145 – 1234)

Shahāb al-Din Abu Hafs Umar al-Suhrawardi
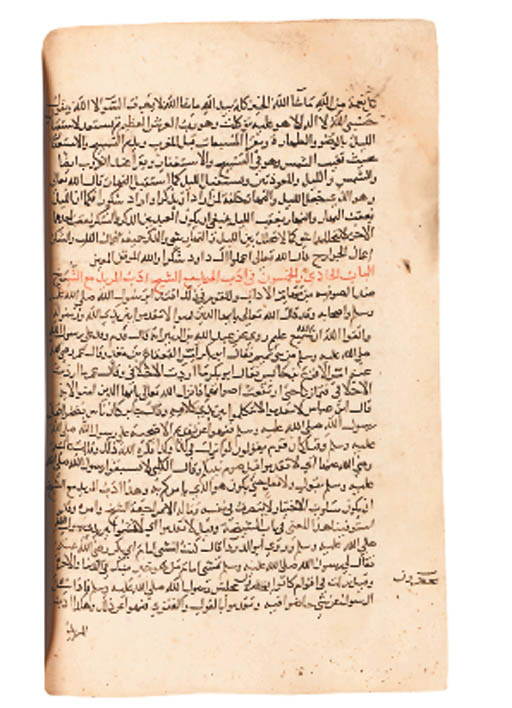
- Manuscript of Suhrawardi's Kitab 'auwarf al-ma'arf. Copy created in Cairo, dated 30 March-29 April 1362
- Title: Shaykh al-Islam

Personal life
- Born: c. 1145 Sohrevard, Seljuk Empire, now Khodabandeh County, Zanjan Province, Iran
- Died: 1234 (aged c. 89) Baghdad, Abbasid Caliphate, now Iraq
- Resting place: Mausoleum of Umar Suhrawardi
- Notable work: Awarif al-Ma'arif
- Other names: Shahabudin, Shahabuddin, Soharwardi, al-Suhrawardi, Soharwardy, Shahab ad-Din

Religious life
- Religion: Islam
- Denomination: Sunni
- Tariqa: Suhrawardiyya

Muslim leader
- Teacher: Abu al-Najib Suhrawardi
- Post: Shaykh al-Islam of the Abbasīd Caliphate
- Period in office: 12th-13th century
- Predecessor: Abu al-Najib Suhrawardi
- Students: Izz al-Din ibn 'Abd al-Salam Saadi Shirazi Bahauddin Zakariya Fakhr al-Din Iraqi Jalaluddin Tabrizi

Shahab al-Din Abu Hafs Umar al-Suhrawardi (c. 1145 – 1234) was a Persian Sufi and nephew of Abu al-Najib Suhrawardi. He expanded the Sufi order of Suhrawardiyya that had been created by his uncle, Abu al-Najib Suhrawardi, and is the person responsible for officially formalizing the order. Suhrawardi is the author of the ʿAwārif al-Maʿārif, which is recognized as a masterpiece work in Tasawwuf.

== Life ==
Suhrawardi traced his lineage back to Abu Bakr, the first Caliph. From an early age onwards, Suhrawardi studied Islamic jurisprudence, law, logic, theology, Quranic studies and Hadith studies. Suhrawardi quickly excelled in his studies and mastered, at an early age, the Shafi'i and Hanbali madhabs. Suhrawardi was eventually designated as Shaykh al-Islam by Caliph al-Nasir under the Abbasids.

== The ʿAwārif al-Maʿārif ==
Suhrawardi wrote the ʿAwārif al-Maʿārif (translated as "Benefits of Intimate Knowledge", or other as "The Knowledge of the Spiritually Learned"). The ʿAwārif al-Maʿārif quickly became one of the most popular books on Sufism throughout the Muslim world. This book was allegedly translated into English by Henry Wilberforce-Clarke and published as "A Dervish Textbook" in 1891, although the Persian text which was the basis for this translation is likely to have been misattributed. It was reprinted by Octagon Press in 1980.

== Gallery ==
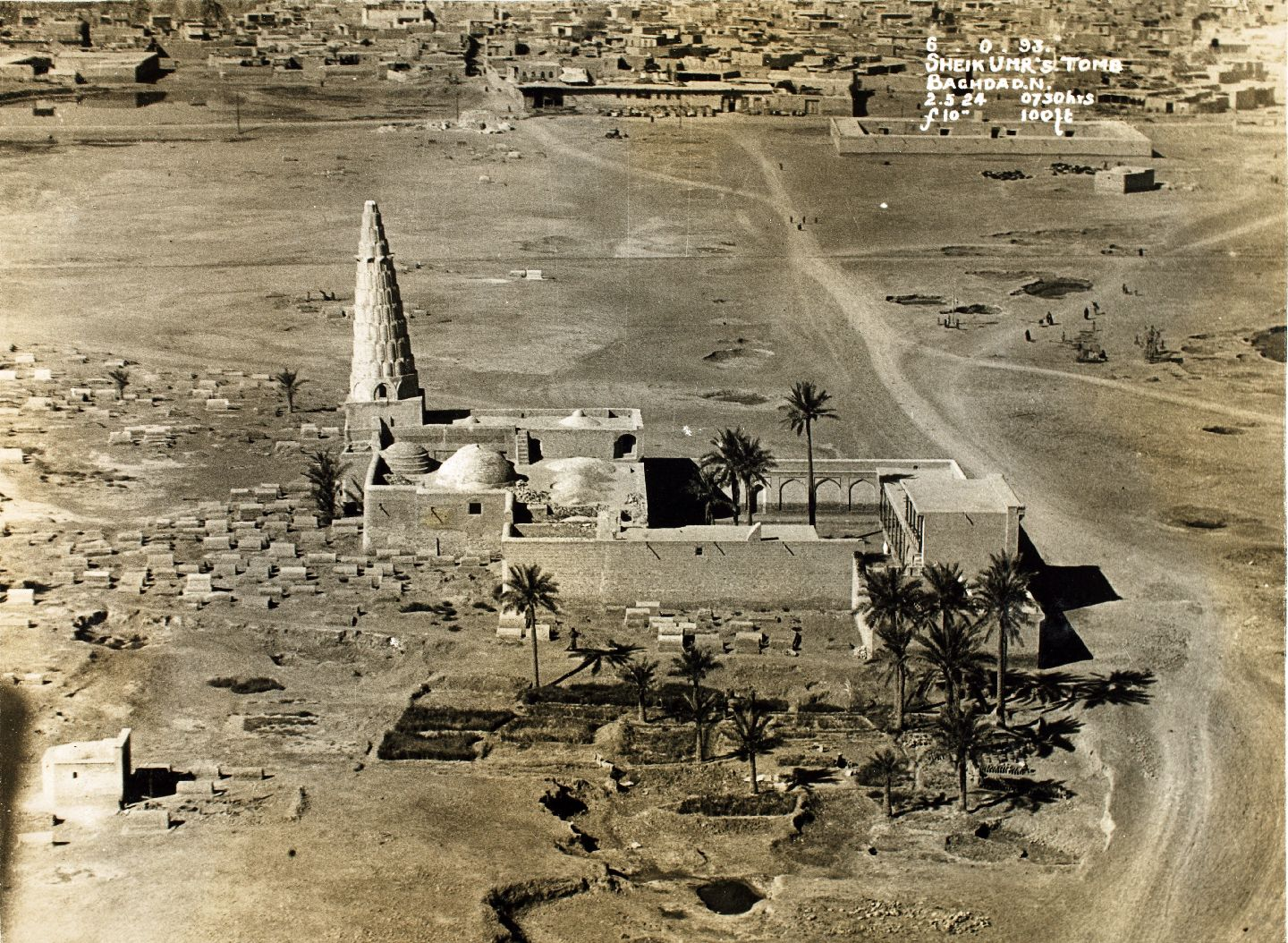
Umar al-Suhrawardi's tomb in Baghdad 1912

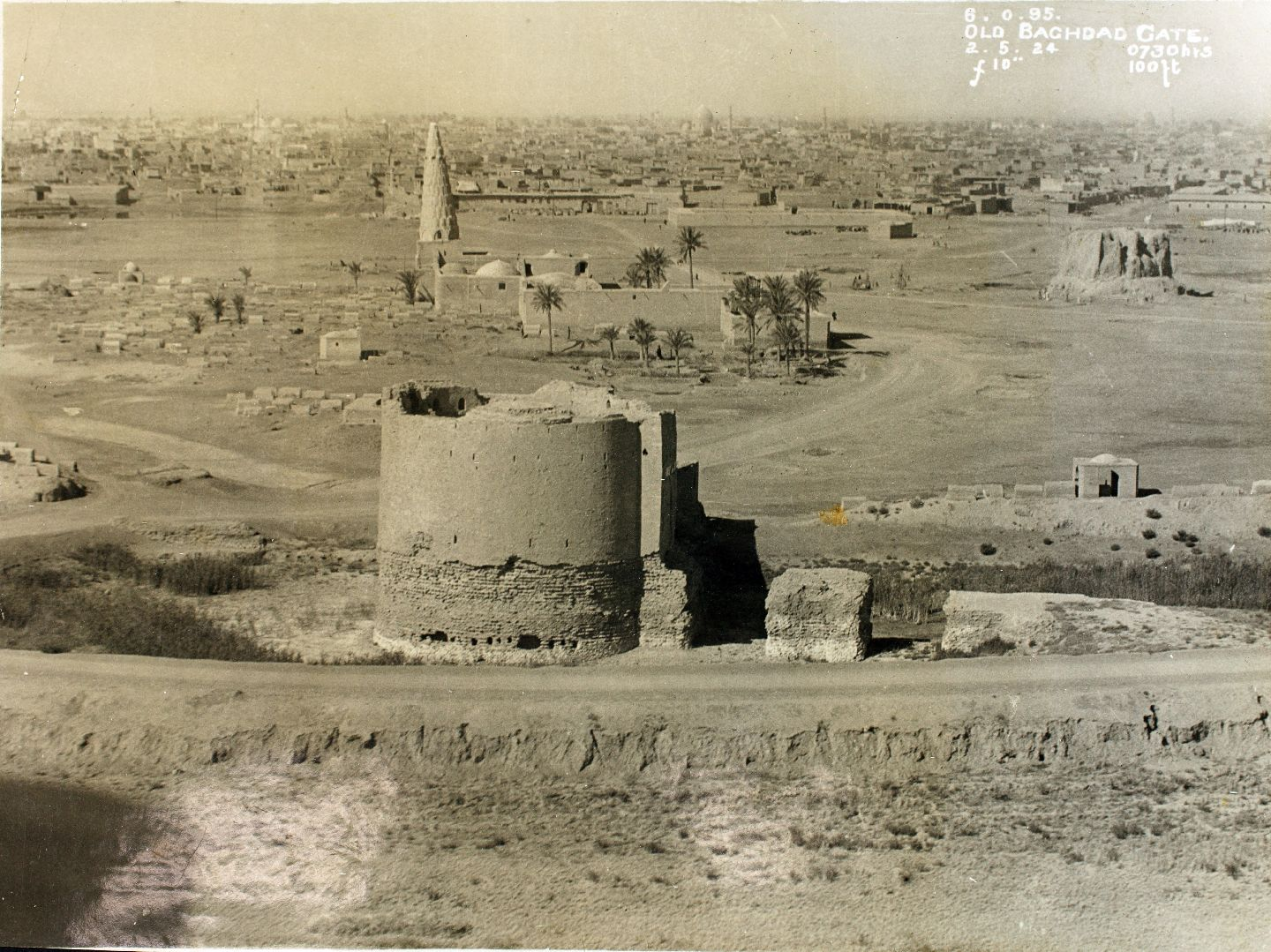
Umar al-Suhrawardi's tomb in Baghdad 1912

== See also ==
- Mausoleum of Umar Suhrawardi
- Suhrawardy family

== Sources ==
- Babaie, Sussan (2019). Iran After the Mongols. Bloomsbury Publishing. ISBN 978-1788315289.
- Ohlander, Erik, Sufism in an Age of Transition: Umar al-Suhrawardi and the Rise of the Islamic Mystical Brotherhood (Leiden, Brill, 2008) (Islamic History and Civilization, 71).
- Huda, Qamar-ul, Striving for Divine Union: Spiritual Exercises for Suhrawardī Sūfīs (Psychology Press, 2003)
- Sobieroj, F. (1997). "Suhrawardiyya". In Bosworth, C. E.; van Donzel, E.; Heinrichs, W. P. & Lecomte, G. (eds.). The Encyclopaedia of Islam, Second Edition. Volume IX: San–Sze. Leiden: E. J. Brill. pp. 784–786. ISBN 978-90-04-10422-8.
