= Mausoleum of Umar Suhrawardi =

Sunni mosque and mausoleum in Baghdad, Iraq

Mausoleum of Umar al-Suhrawardi
- جامع ومرقد الشيخ عمر السهروردي
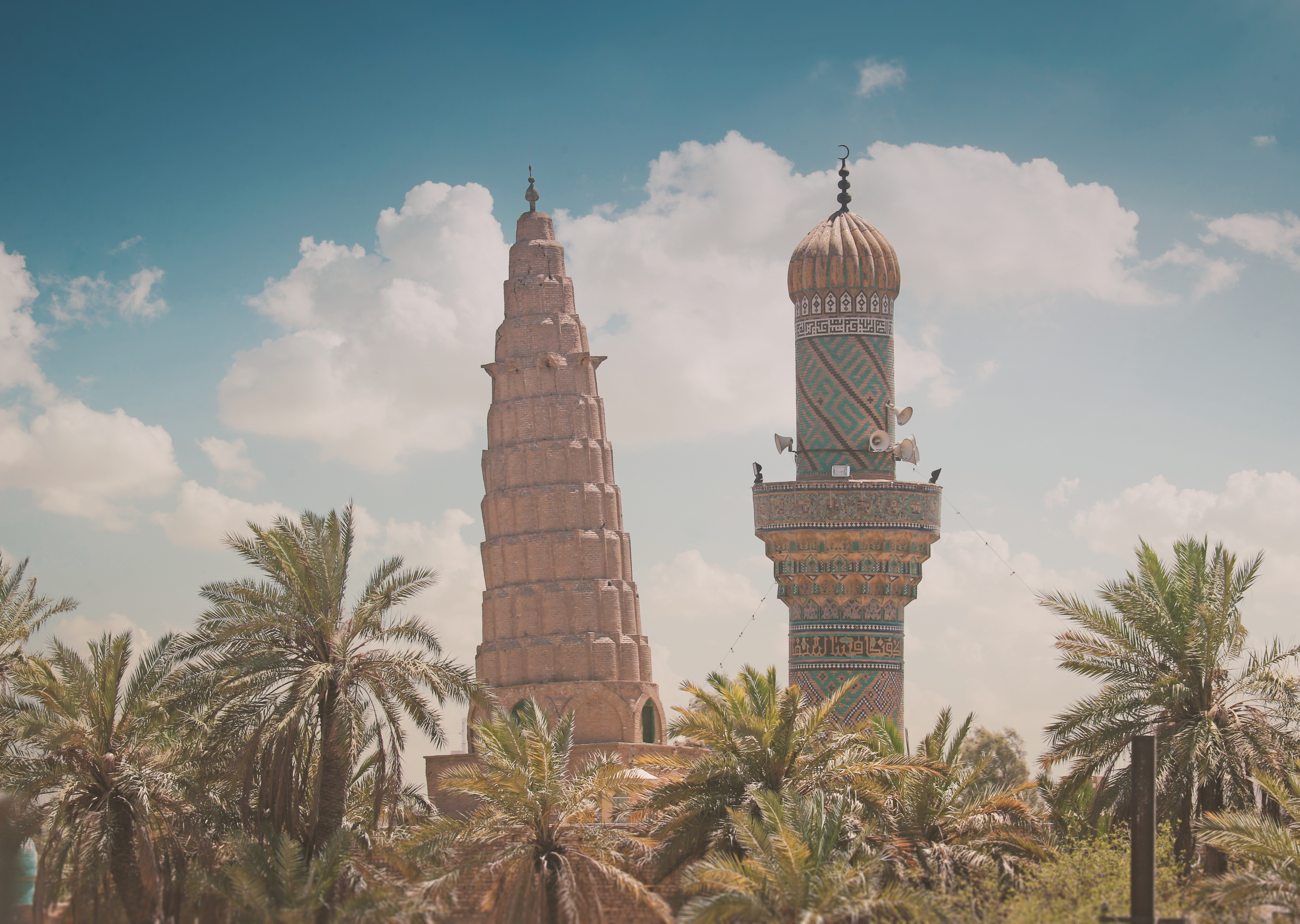
- The conical dome and minaret in 2017

- Location of the mosque in Baghdad

Religion
- Affiliation: Sunni Islam
- Ecclesiastical or organisational status: Mosque and mausoleum
- Status: Active

Location
- Location: Al-Rusafa, Baghdad, Baghdad Governorate
- Country: Iraq
- Interactive map of Mausoleum of Umar al-Suhrawardi
- Coordinates: 33°21′2″N 44°24′7″E

Architecture
- Type: Islamic architecture
- Style: Abbasid; Seljuk; Ottoman
- Founder: al-Nasir li-Din Allah
- Completed: 12th century CE (mausoleum); 735 AH (1334/1335 CE) (dome); 20th century (mosque; renovations)

Specifications
- Capacity: 400 worshippers
- Interior area: 600 m^{2} (6,500 sq ft)
- Dome: One: (conical)
- Minaret: One
- Shrine: Two: Abu Hafs Umar al-Suhrawardi
- Materials: Marble; bricks

The Mausoleum of Umar al-Suhrawardi, also known as the Mosque and the Tomb of the Sheikh Umar al-Suhrawardi (Arabic: جامع ومرقد الشيخ عمر السهروردي, romanized: Suhrawardi Mausoleum), is a Sunni mausoleum and mosque complex, located in the southern part of Al-Rusafa, west of the historical Bab al-Wastani gate, in Baghdad, Iraq. The complex dates back to the Abbasid Caliphate and is dedicated to Shihab al-Din 'Umar al-Suhrawardi, the founder of Suhrawardi order of Sufism. The mosque is located near the Bab al-Wastani of the Baghdad wall. The conical muqarnas dome is similar to other Abbasid-era conical domes like Zumurrud Khatun Mosque and Mausoleum in Baghdad and the former Imam Dur Mausoleum.

== Architecture ==
The mosque was completed in the 12th-century in the Abbasid style, and the mosque was named after Abu Hafs Umar al-Suhrawardi who was buried in the nearby cemetery. The mosque was renovated by the Ismail Pasha in 1902 and in 1926; and again in 1964 by the Sunni Endowment Office. In 2010, it was reported that the conical tower was in danger of collapse.

The dome was constructed in 735 AH (1334/1335 CE), as indicated by the inscriptions in Thuluth script above the entrance. The dome's design is similar to structures like the Dome of Ezekiel in Babylon. It has ten layers, the lower six consisting of 16 convex niches with rectangular projections, transitioning through octagonal motifs to a ribbed conical cap. The dome and its inscriptions were reportedly renewed by Jamal al-Din Abd al-Rahman ibn Abd al-Mahmud, as inferred from historical texts. Modern renovations focused on structural stability and preservation following the 2003 Iraq War.

The interior features twelve alcoves (three on each wall) with central alcoves adorned by pointed arches supported by plaster columns. Qur'anic inscriptions surround the walls, transitioning to a 16-sided star pattern leading to the hemispherical dome. The square base is approximately 7.5 metres (25 ft) wide and 7.7 metres (25 ft) high. The dome sits atop a drum with intricate muqarnas detailing and is crowned with a ribbed conical structure, tapering into a polygonal peak.

=== Inscriptions ===
The main entrance of the mausoleum includes the following inscriptions:

"بسم الله الرحمن الرحيم، ألا إن أولياء الله لا خوف عليهم ولا هم يحزنون. جدد هذه العمارة المباركة (الشريفة) لضريح الشيخ القدوة الرباني قطب الأولياء والعارفين شهاب الدين عمر بن محمد السهروردي، روض الله مرقده محمد بن الرشيد أصلح الله شأنه وذلك في شهور سنة خمس وثلاثون وسبعمائة، والحمد لله وحده وصلواته على نبيه محمد وآله."

The conical dome's inscriptions:

"بسم الله الرحمن الرحيم، فانظر إلى آثار رحمة الله كيف يحيي الله الأرض بعد موتها، إن ذلك لمحيي الموتى وهو على كل شيء قدير. أمر بتجديده بعد دثوره.."

== Gallery ==
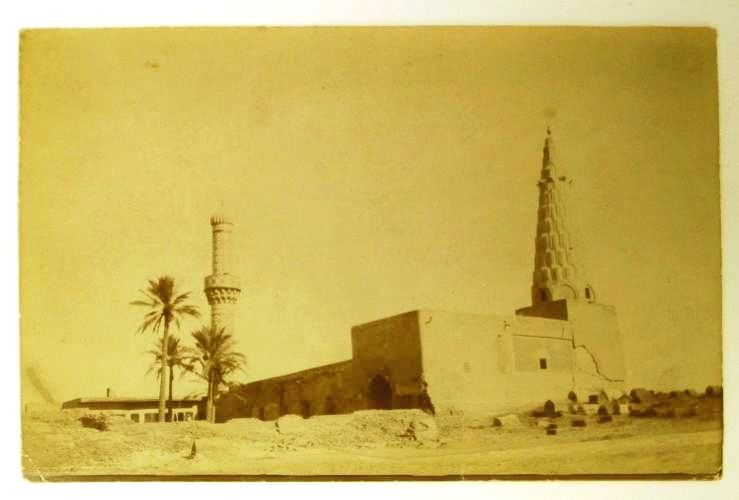
The mosque

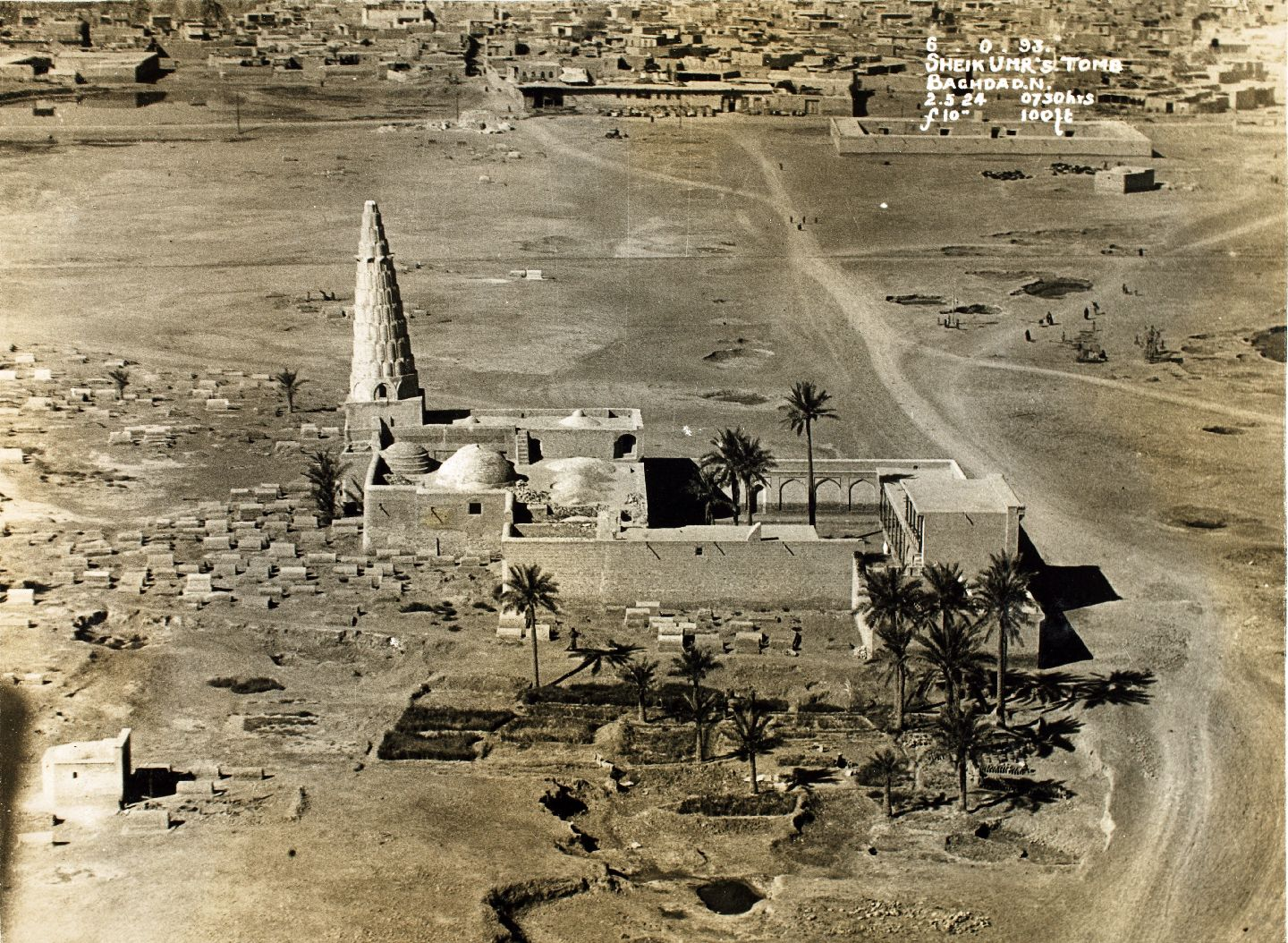
The mausoleum in 1924

== See also ==
- Islam in Iraq
- List of mosques in Baghdad
