= Imam Muhammad =

Imam Muhammad may refer to:

- Imam Mahdi, the messiah anticipated in Islam
- Muhammad al-Shaybani, student of Abu Hanifa
- Muhammad ibn Ali, Muhammad ibn al-Hanafiyyah, the fourth Imam according to Kaysanites Shia
- Muhammad ibn Ali, Muhammad ibn Ali ibn Abdallah, grandson of Abdullah bin Abbas and the father of As-Saffah the first Abbasid Caliph. He was the Imam of Kaysanites Shia after the demise of Abu Hashim, as well
- Muhammad ibn Ali, Muhammad al-Baqir, the fourth Imam according to Mustaali and Nizari Ismaili and the fifth Imam according to Twelvers, Seveners and Karmatians
