= Humayma =

Archaeological site in southern Jordan

- الحميمة (Arabic)
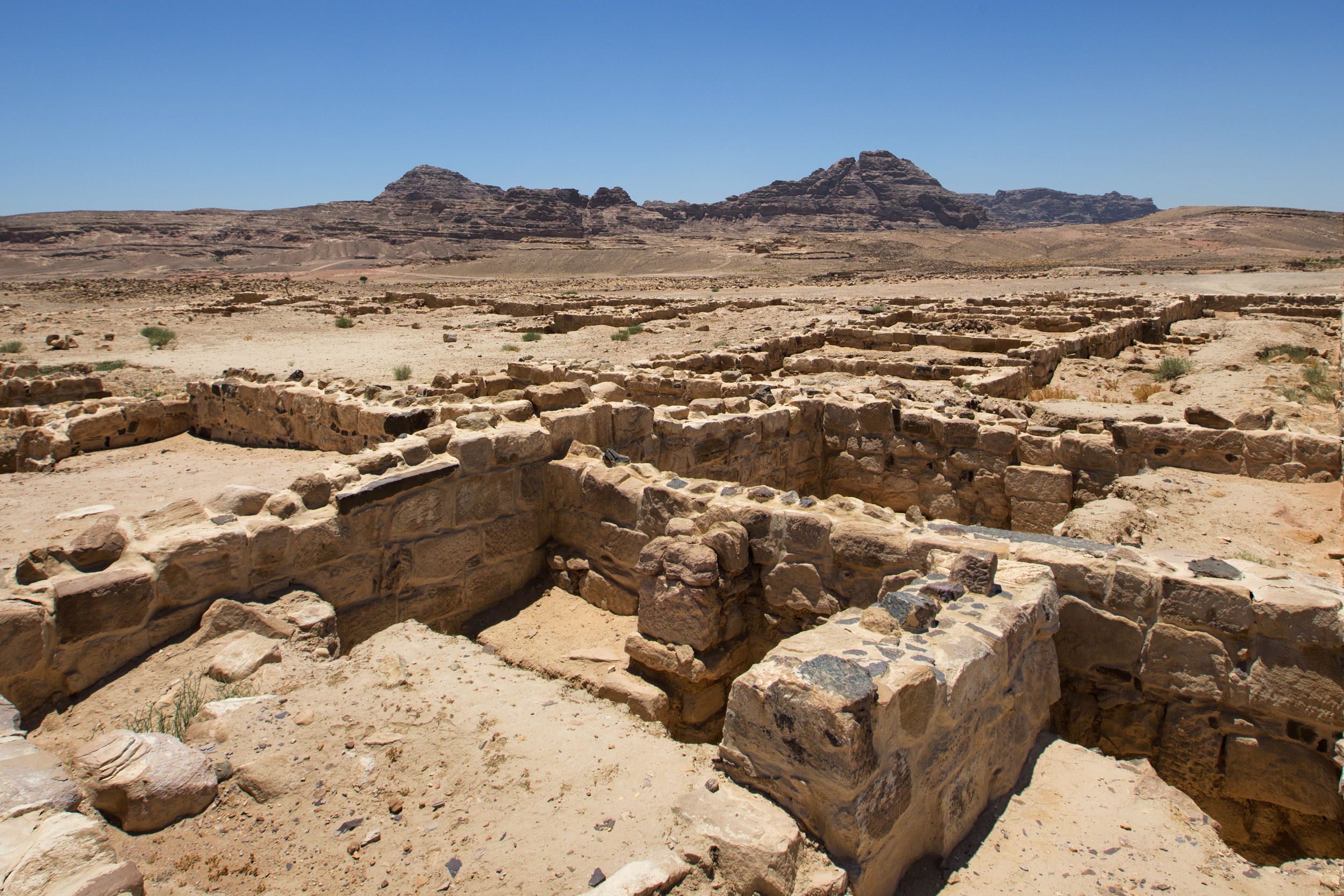
- Humayma in 2013

- Location within Jordan
- 29°57′0″N 35°20′49″E
- Location: Jordan
- Region: Aqaba Governorate

Humayma (Arabic: الحميمة, romanized: al-Humayma) also spelled Humeima and Humaima, is the modern name of ancient Hawara. Hawara was a trading post in southern Jordan that was founded by the Nabataean king Aretas III in the early first century BC. It is located 45 km to the south of the Nabataean capital Petra and 55 km to the north of the Red Sea port town of Aqaba.

== History ==
Humeima was occupied from about 90 BC until the Early Islamic period, and has Nabataean, Roman, Byzantine and Islamic remains, including a Roman bath and fort, five Byzantine churches, and a qasr or fortified palace from the Umayyad Period.

=== Nabataean and Roman periods ===
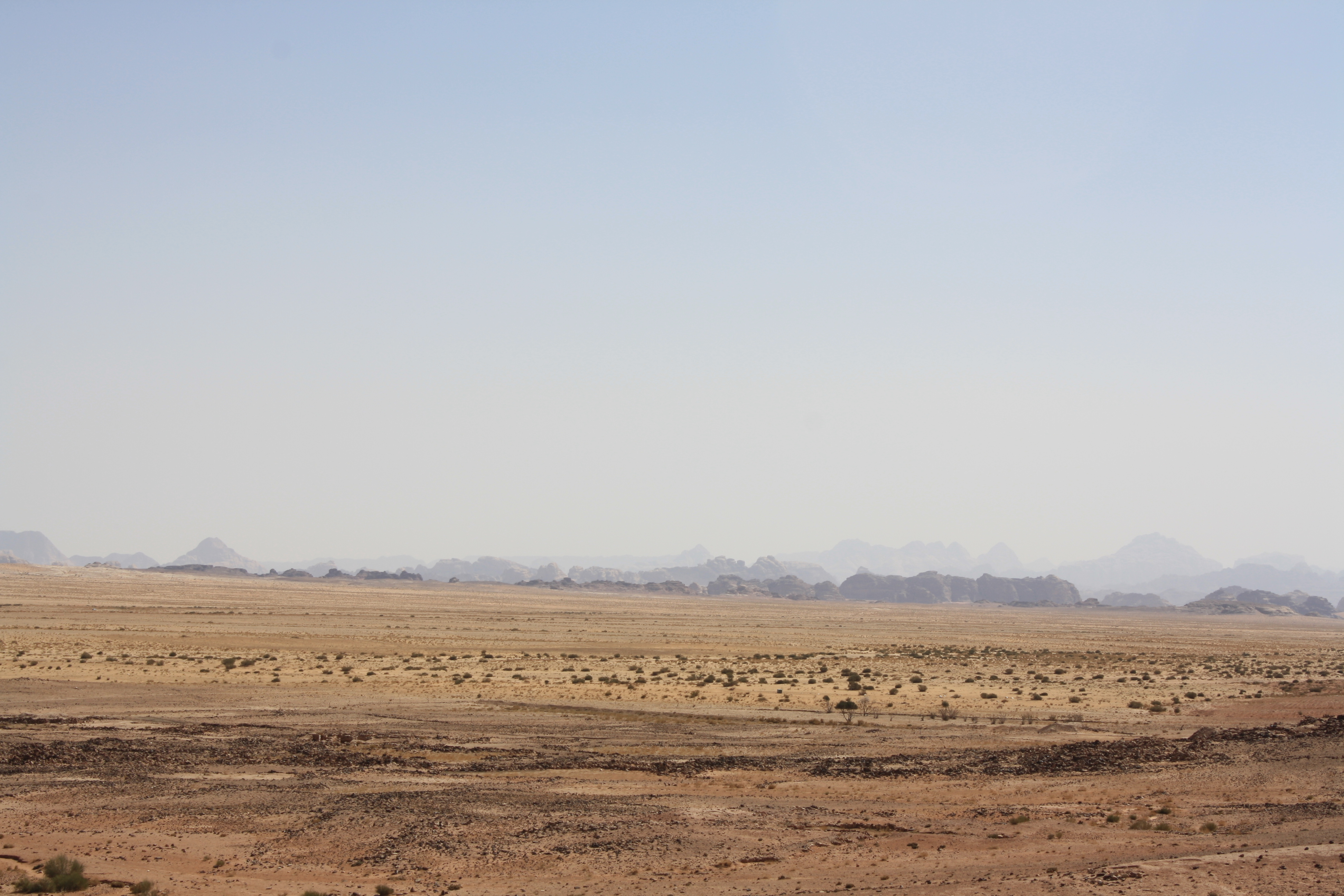
Landscape south of Humayma

The settlement was founded by Aretas III as a stop on the trade route from Petra to Gulf of Aqaba. During the Greco-Roman era, it was called "Auara" (Greek: Αὔαρα), derived from "Hawara", which means "white" in Aramaic. (Note: Hawara as mentioned by Ptolemy in the Tabula Peutingeriana.)

In 2012 and 2014, more than 150 petroglyphs were documented during a survey at Humayma. Most were simple figures, but one stands out as a detailed depiction of a religious ceremony. The scene shows a human figure performing a religious offering to a deity. This petroglyph is one of the most intricate found at the site, and its dating suggests it was created during the Nabataean or Roman periods, between the late 1st century BC and the 5th century AD.

=== Abbasid period ===
The town was the home of the Abbasid family, around AD 700, who eventually overthrew the Umayyad dynasty and took over the title of caliph, and as such it was the birthplace of the first three Abbasid caliphs: Al-Saffah (r. 750–754), Al-Mansur (r. 754–775) and Al-Mahdi (r. 775–785). The family residence of the Abbasids which was a large qasr had a roughly square plan, approximately 61 by 50 m, with a recessed entrance facing east, and a large central court, arguably one of the so-called desert castles, of which very little remains today.

== Climate ==
As rainfall is only 80 mm annually, an extensive water storage and irrigation works lies in the ruins.

== Notable residents ==
Chronologically:

- Abd Allah ibn Muhammad ibn al-Hanafiyya (died c. 716 in Humayma), an early Muslim jurist and narrator of hadith
- Muhammad ibn Ali ibn Abdallah (c. 680 - c. 744), the progenitor of the Abbasid dynasty, born in Humayma
- Sallamah Umm Abdallah, ancestor of Abbasid dynasty, mother of caliph al-Mansur and grandmother of Abbasid Caliph al-Mahdi.
- Al-Mansur (714–775), the second Abbasid Caliph (r. 754–775), born at Humeima
- Al-Saffah (721/722–754), the first Abbasid Caliph (r. 750–754), born at Humeima
- Al-Mahdi (744/45–785), the third Abbasid Caliph (r. 775–785), born at Humeima
- Ja'far ibn Abdallah al-Mansur, an Abbasid prince and father of Zubaidah (766 – 831)

== Gallery ==
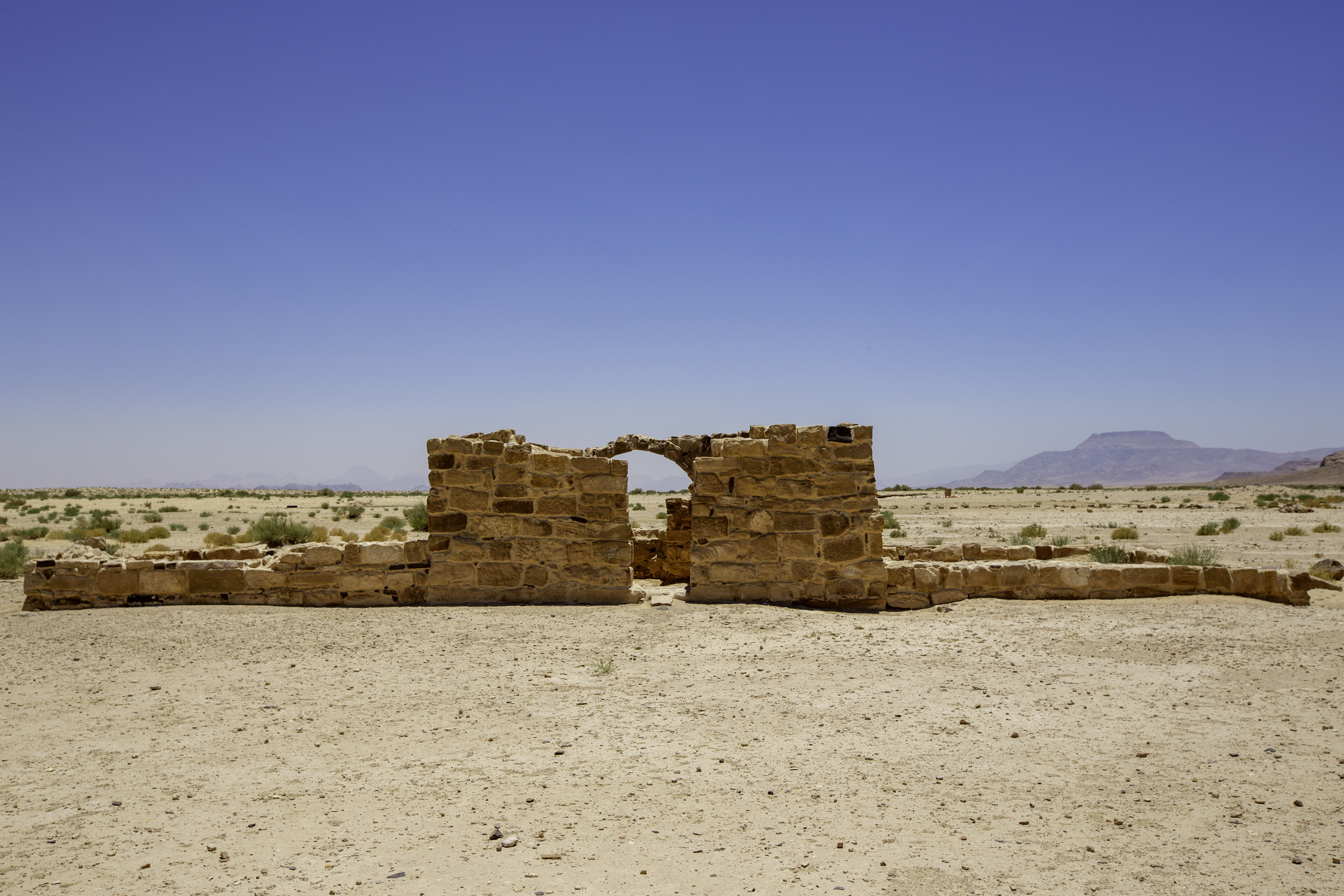
Humayma arch

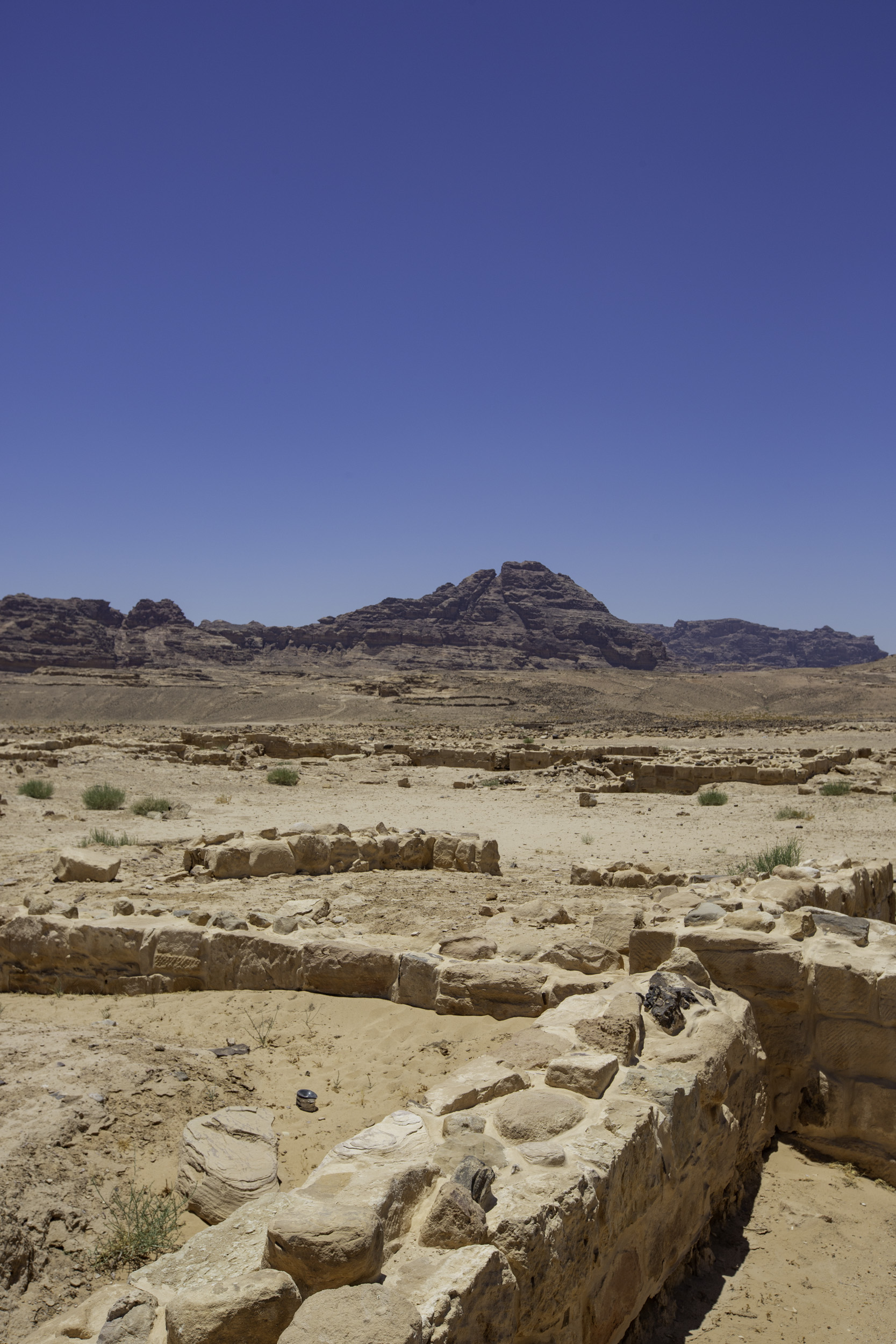
Humayma fort and bath ruins

== See also ==
- Desert castles

== Sources ==
- Kuhnen, Hans-Peter; Ritter-Burkert, Johanna; Pfahl, Stefan Franz (2018). Wüstengrenze des Imperium Romanum – Die Schicksalsgrenze Roms im Orient von Augustus bis Heraclius (in German). Mainz: Nünnerich-Asmus Verlag & Media GmbH. ISBN 978-3-96176-010-7.
