= Muhammad ibn al-Hanafiyya =

Alid political and religious leader (c. 637–700)

Muhammad ibn al-Hanafiyya مُحَمَّد ابْن الْحَنَفِيَّة
- Preceded by: Husayn ibn Ali
- Succeeded by: Abu Hashim

Personal life
- Born: c. 637–638 CE (16 AH) Medina, Hejaz
- Died: 700–701 CE Medina, Hejaz
- Children: Abd Allah; Hasan; and 11 other sons
- Parents: Ali ibn Abi Talib (father); Khawla al-Hanafiyya (mother)

Religious life
- Religion: Islam

Muhammad ibn al-Hanafiyya (Arabic: مُحَمَّد ابْن الْحَنَفِيَّة, romanized: Muḥammad ibn al-Ḥanafiyya, c. 637–700, 15–81 AH) was a son of Ali and an effective lieutenant for his father during his caliphate. After the assassination of Ali and the deaths of his two sons Hasan and Husayn, the events occurring in 661, 670 and 680 respectively, many recognized Ibn al-Hanafiyya as the head of the Alids. Claiming to represent Ibn al-Hanafiyya, Mukhtar al-Thaqafi rose in Iraq in 686 to avenge Husayn and his relatives, who were killed at the Battle of Karbala by the forces of the second Umayyad caliph Yazid I. The quiescent Ibn al-Hanafiyya did not actively associate with this rebellion but was still rescued by Mukhtar when he was detained by the rival caliph Abd Allah ibn al-Zubayr.

Support for Ibn al-Hanafiyya continued even after the death of Mukhtar in 686 in the form of the Kaysanites, a now-extinct Shia sect that traced the Imamate to Ibn al-Hanafiyya and his descendants, particularly his son Abu Hashim. After the death of Ibn al-Hanafiyya in 700–701, some Kaysanites declared that he was the Mahdi, the eschatological Islamic leader who would reappear in the End Times and eradicate injustice and evil alongside Isa (Jesus). The Kaysanites later provided the organizational structure for the Abbasids to overthrow the Umayyads in 750.

== Birth ==
Often known by his sobriquet Ibn al-Hanafiyya, Muhammad was born to Khawla bint Ja'far, a woman from the Banu Hanifa tribe, and Ali ibn Abi Talib, a cousin of the Islamic prophet Muhammad. Ali is also recognized as the fourth Rashidun caliph (r. 656–661) and the first Shia imam. Ibn al-Hanafiyya was either born in 16 AH (637–638 CE), or circa 633. He was the only child of Khawla, a freed slave, whom Ali had married sometime after the death of his first wife Fatima, daughter of Muhammad. The kunya of Ibn Hanafiyya was Abu al-Qasim.

== Early life ==
After the assassination of the third Rashidun caliph Uthman ibn Affan (r. 644–656), Ali was elected as caliph in Medina. During his caliphate, Ibn al-Hanafiyya accompanied Ali in his battles, as his champion and standard-bearer. Ibn al-Hanafiyyah was in his early twenties during the First Fitna and accompanied his father in the Battle of the Camel, the Battle of Siffin and the Battle of Nahrawan. During the Battle of Siffin, on 22 July 657, Ibn al-Hanafiyyah was challenged to a duel by Ubaydallah ibn Umar. Ibn al-Hanafiyyah initially accepted this challenge but was eventually recalled by Ali, who feared that Ubaydallah would succeed in slaying Muhammad. When Ali was assassinated at Kufa in January 661, his eldest son Hasan was proclaimed caliph there, but later was forced to abdicate in favor of Mu'awiya I (r. 661–680) in August 661.

Hasan died in 669 in Medina, poisoned allegedly at the instigation of Mu'awiya, who nominated his own son Yazid I (r. 680–683) as his successor. Yazid is 0often portrayed by Muslim historians as impious and immoral. Hasan was thus succeeded by his younger brother Husayn as the head of Banu Hashim. When Marwan ibn al-Hakam prevented the burial of Hasan near his grandfather, Ibn al-Hanafiyya is said to have convinced Husayn to bury their brother in the Baqi Cemetery.

=== Battle of Karbala ===
Upon Mu'awiya's death and Yazid's accession in 680, the latter instructed his governor of Medina to secure Husayn's pledge of allegiance. Husayn immediately left for Mecca to avoid recognizing Yazid as the caliph. There Husayn received some letters of support from Kufans, whose intentions were verified by his envoy, Muslim ibn Aqil. Among many others, Ibn al-Hanafiyya is said to have warned Husayn not to trust the Kufans, who had betrayed their father Ali and their brother Hasan, suggesting that he should instead stay in Mecca or conceal himself in Yemen.

Husayn ignored such warnings, saying that he expected to be killed while fighting the tyranny of Yazid. The promised Kufan support did not materialize as Ubayd Allah ibn Ziyad, the new governor of Kufa, killed Husayn's envoy and intimidated Kufan tribal chiefs. On their way to Kufa in 680, Husayn's small caravan was intercepted by a Kufan army under Ibn Ziyad. He was killed in the ensuing Battle of Karbala, alongside most of his male relatives and his small retinue. After the battle, the women and children in Husayn's camp were taken prisoner and marched to the Umayyad capital, Damascus. Unlike Husayn, the quiescent Ibn al-Hanafiyya is said to have pledged his allegiance to Yazid after the death of Husayn. Some sources record that Yazid sent a lengthy letter to Ibn al-Hanafiyyah requesting his allegiance, and Muhammad agreed to pledge allegiance to Yazid without meeting him in person.

== Uprising of Mukhtar ==
After the death of Husayn, his only surviving son, Ali al-Sajjad, retired to an apolitical life in Medina. Ibn al-Hanafiyya was thus considered by many as the head of the Alids. Indeed, Mukhtar al-Thaqafi soon claimed to represent Ibn Hanafiyya in Kufa, calling to avenge the Karbala massacre. His efforts were bolstered by the defeat of the Tawwabun rebellion in 684. Mukhtar eventually seized control of Kufa in 686 from Abd Allah ibn al-Zubayr, who in 680 had established in Mecca an alternative caliphate that rivaled the Umayyads. The noncommittal response of Ibn al-Hanafiyya was interpreted by a Kufan delegation as an implicit endorsement of Mukhtar, which in turn strengthened the Kufans' support for the latter.

=== Mahdi ===
After Husayn's death, Mukhtar likely considered Ibn al-Hanafiyya as the rightful imam, referring to him as Ali's surviving wasi (lit. 'legatee') after Hasan and Husayn. Mukhtar also referred to Ibn Hanafiyya as the Mahdi (lit. 'the rightly-guided one'). At this point, however, this title probably did not have any messianic implications. At any rate, Ibn al-Hanafiyya is said to have avoided this title. He remained in his hometown of Madina and declined active leadership of the revolution. Perhaps an indication of his equivocal attitude towards the rebellion, Ibn al-Hanafiyya is said to have been represented in some later Hajj pilgrimages by his personal flag as the head of the Alids.

=== Avenging Husayn ===
True to his promise, Mukhtar killed several figures responsible for the Karbala massacre, including the Kufan governor Ibn Ziyad and the Umayyad commander Umar ibn Sa'd (d. 686), whose head was then sent to Ibn al-Hanafiyya by some accounts. Also killed was Shimr ibn Dhi al-Jawshan, often viewed as responsible for beheading Husayn in Karbala. Elsewhere, Murra ibn Munqidh al-Abdi survived a revenge attempt but was severely wounded. He is said to have killed Husayn's son Ali al-Akbar. Yet Asma ibn Kharija al-Fazari and Muhammad ibn al-Ash'ath al-Kindi escaped Mukhtar unharmed. The former was sought for his role in killing Muslim ibn Aqil and the latter was accused of insulting Husayn at Karbala.

=== Confrontation with Ibn al-Zubayr ===
Saying that he was waiting for communal consensus, Ibn al-Hanafiyya had refused to pledge his allegiance to Ibn al-Zubayr, the caliph in Mecca. Some have therefore suggested that Ibn al-Hanafiyya might have had his own ambitions for the high office. Perhaps it was this refusal to take the oath of allegiance and the takeover of Kufa by Mukhtar that provoked the Meccan caliph to imprison Ibn al-Hanafiyya, who now wrote to Mukhtar for help and was rescued by his military detachment(s). The rescue mission is said to have been bloodless, as Ibn al-Hanafiyya had forbidden Mukhtar's men from fighting in the sanctuary of Mecca. This appeal for help suggests that the passive attitude of Ibn al-Hanafiyya towards Mukhtar has been exaggerated. Ibn al-Hanafiyya then settled in Mina, near Mecca, and later in Ta'if.

=== Death of Mukhtar ===
Mukhtar was defeated and killed in 686–687, yet Ibn al-Hanafiyya was not compromised afterward, which perhaps indicates his weak ties with Mukhtar. Ibn al-Hanafiyya continued to withhold his support from the two rival caliphates until the fall of Ibn al-Zubayr in 692, at which point he pledged his allegiance to the Umayyad caliph Abd al-Malik (r. 685–705). By some accounts, he visited the caliph in Damascus in 692, who generously compensated him.

== Offspring and descendants ==
Ibn al-Hanafiyya had a total of thirteen sons, and they were Ja'far al-Akbar, Abd Allah, Ja'far al-Asghar, Awn, Ali al-Akbar, Ibrahim, al-Qasim, Abd al-Rahman, al-Hasan, Hamzah, Ali al-Asghar and Ubayd Allah. However, Ja'far al-Asghar is the only son from whom the lineage of Ibn al-Hanafiyya continues till the present day as per the consensus of Alawiyyin genealogists.

== Kaysanites ==
The now-extinct Kaysanites were a Shia sect that traced the imamate to Ibn al-Hanafiyya and his descendants. The sect emerged from the uprising of Mukhtar, whose death did not end the propaganda in favor of Ibn al-Hanafiyya. The Kaysanites condemned the caliphs preceding Ali ibn Abi Talib as usurpers of his right to succeed the Islamic prophet Muhammad. Most of them regarded Hasan, then Husayn, and finally Ibn al-Hanafiyya as the divinely-appointed imams after Ali ibn Abi Talib. When Ibn al-Hanafiyya died in 700–701, or in 703 or 705, most Kaysanites followed his son Abu Hashim, but some thought that Ibn al-Hanafiyya had entered occultation, that is, he was providentially concealed from mankind until his reappearance by divine will. This was perhaps when the concept of the Mahdi became mainstream as the eschatological Islamic leader who would eradicate injustice and evil in the end of time. He being the last (notable) son of Ali, the death of Ibn Hanafiyya also further divided the Shia community.

It is difficult to estimate the numerical strength of the Kaysanites. Late during the Umayyad period, they likely outnumbered the Imami Shias, who followed a Husaynid line of imams through Ali al-Sajjad (Zayn al-'Abidin) and Muhammad al-Baqir. Indeed, Ibn al-Hanafiyya and later his successor Abu Hashim diverted considerable support from Ali al-Sajjad and his successor Muhammad al-Baqir, for neither of the two laid any public claim to the imamate and both were politically quiescent. The movement of Mukhtar ultimately paved the way for the overthrow of the Umayyads, as the Kaysanites provided the organizational structure for the successful rebellion of the Abbasids, who claimed descent from Muhammad's paternal uncle, Abbas. They postulated that Abu Hashim was succeeded to the imamate by the head of the Abbasid family, Muhammad ibn Ali. This was apparently the main Abbasid claim to legitimacy until they declared around 780 that the heir of the Islamic prophet Muhammad was his uncle Abbas rather than his cousin and son-in-law, Ali ibn Abi Talib. The Abbasids thus gradually turned against the mainstream Shia, carrying with themselves large numbers of the Kaysanites to Sunnism.

== Family tree ==
Quraysh tribe
Waqida bint Amr | Abd Manaf ibn Qusayy | Ātikah bint Murrah
Nawfal | ‘Abd Shams | Barra | Hala | Muṭṭalib | Hashim | Salma bint Amr
Umayya | ʿAbd al-Muṭṭalib
Harb | Abū al-ʿĀs | ʿĀmina | ʿAbdallāh | Hamza | Abu Ṭālib | al-Zubayr | al-ʿAbbās | Abū Lahab
Abu Sufyān | al-Ḥakam | ʿAffān | MUHAMMAD (Family tree) | Khadija bint Khuwaylid | ʿAlī (Family tree) | Khawlah bint Ja'far | Ibn Abbas
Muʿāwiya I | Marwān I | ʿUthmān | Ruqayya | Fatimah | Muhammad ibn al-Hanafiyyah | ʿAli
Sufyanids | Marwanids | al-Ḥasan | al-Ḥusayn (Family tree) | Abu Hasim (Imām of al-Mukhtār and Hashimiyya) | Muhammad "al-Imām" (Abbasids)
Ibrāhim "al-Imām" | al-Saffāḥ | al-Mansur

The comparative genealogy of the Abbasid caliphs with their rival Zaydi imams

Abbasids

Caliphs of the Abbasid Caliphate
Caliphs of Cairo
Zaydi imams

ʿAbd al-Muṭṭalib ibn ʿHāshīm
ʾAbū Ṭālib ibn ʿAbd al-Muṭṭalib | Abū'l-Fādl al-ʿAbbās ibn ʿAbd al-Muṭṭalib | ʿAbd Allāh ibn ʿAbd al-Muṭṭalib
ʿAlīyyū'l-Murtaḍžā^{(1st Imām of Kaysāniyyā, Zaydīyyā, Imāmiyyā)} | Hibr al-Ummah ʿAbd Allāh ibn al-ʿAbbās | Khātam al-Nabiyyin; Abū'l-Qāsīm; Muḥammad ibn ʿAbd Allāh
Al-Ḥasan al-Mujtabā^{(2nd Imām of Kaysāniyyā, Zaydīyyā, Imāmiyyā)} | Hussayn ibn Ali^{(3rd Imām of Kaysāniyyā, Zaydīyyā, Imāmiyyā)} | Abū'l-Qāsīm Muḥammad al-Hānafīyya^{(4th Imām of Kaysāniyyā)} | ʿAlī ibn ʿAbd Allāh al-Sajjad
Al-Ḥasan al-Mu'thannā^{(5th Imām of Zaydiyyā)} | Ali al-Sajjad (Zayn al-ʿĀbidīn)^{(4th Imām of Zaydiyyā, Imāmiyyā)} | Abū Hāshīm ʿAbd Allāh ibn Muḥammad^{(5th Imām of Hāsheemīyyā)} | Muḥammad "al-Imām"^{(6th Imām of Hāsheemīyyā)} 716/7 - 743 | ʿAbd Allāh ibn ʿAlī^{(Governor of Syria)} 750–754 | Ṣāliḥ ibn ʿAlī^{(Governor of Egypt)} 750–751
ʿAbd Allāh al-Kāmīl ibn al-Ḥasan al-Mu'thannā | Zayd ibn Ali^{(6th Imām of Zaydiyyā)} | Ibrāhim (Ebrāheem) "al-Imām"^{(7th Imām of Hāsheemīyyā)} 743 - 749 | Abū Jāʿfar ʿAbd Allāh al-Mānṣūr^{(2)} r. 754–775 | Abū'l-ʿAbbās ʿAbd Allāh as-Saffāh^{(1)} r. 750–754 | Mūsā ibn Muḥammad "al-Imām"
Nafsū'zZakiyya^{(First elected caliph by Ibrāhim, Mānṣūr, Saffāh, Imām Mālīk & Abū Ḥanīfa)}^{(8th Imām of Zaydiyyā)} | Yahya ibn Zayd^{(7th Imām of Zaydiyyā)} | Abū Muslīm al-Khurāsānī^{(Governor of Khurasan)} 748–755 | Muḥammad al-Mahdī^{(3)} r. 775–785 | Jāʿfar^{(Wali al-Ahd & Governor of Mosul)} 762–764 | ʿĪsā ibn Mūsā^{(Governor of Kufa)} 750–765
ʿAbd Allāh; Shāh Ghāzī (ʿAbd Allāh ibn Muḥammad)^{(10th Imām of Zaydiyyā)} | Ibrāhīm ibn ʿAbd Allāh al-Kāmīl ibn al-Ḥasan al-Mu'thannā^{ibn Ḥasan al-Mujtabā}^{(9th Imām of Zaydiyyā)} | Al-Ḥusayn ibn ʿAlī al-ʿĀbid ibn al-Ḥasan al-Mu'thallath^{ibn Ḥasan al-Mu'thannā}^{(12th Imām of Zaydiyyā)} | Hārūn ar-Rāshīd^{(5)} r. 786–809 | ʿMūsā al-Hādī^{(4)} r. 785–786 | ^{(The Governors)}: Mūsā ^{(Kufa, Egypt & Medina)}; Ismā'īl ^{(Egypt)}; Dā'wūd^{(Medina)}
Sulaymān^{ibn ʿAbd Allāh al-Kāmīl ibn al-Ḥasan II}^{(Emir of Tlemcen)}^{(Sulaymanid dynasty of Western Algeria)} | Yaḥyā^{ibn ʿAbd Allāh al-Kāmīl ibn al-Ḥasan al-Mu'thannā}^{(14th Imām of Zaydiyyā)} | Ibrāhīm Ṭabāṭabā^{ibn Ismāʿīl al-Dībādj ibn Ibrāhīm al-Ghamr ibn al-Ḥasan al-Mu'thannā} | Muḥammad al-Mu'tasim^{(8)} r. 833–842 | Abd Allāh al-Ma'mun^{(7)} r. 813–833 | Muḥammad al-Amin^{(6)} r. 809–813
Sūlaymān^{ibn ʿAbd Allāh as-Sālih ibn Mūsā al-Jawn ibn ʿAbd Allāh al-Kāmīl ibn al-Ḥasan al-Mu'thannā} | Idrīs the Elder ibn ʿAbd Allāh^{(Idrisid dynasty of Morocco)}^{(15th Imām of Zaydiyyā)} | Muḥammad ibn IbrāhīmṬabāṭabā^{(16th Imām of Zaydiyyā)} | Jāʿfar al-Mutawakkil^{(10)} r. 847–861 | Muḥammad ibn Muḥammad al-Mu'tasim | Hārūn al-Wathiq^{(9)} r. 842–847
Mūsā II^{ibn ʿAbd Allāh as-Sâlih ibn Mūsā al-Jawn ibn ʿAbd Allāh al-Kāmīl} | Idrīs ibn Idrīs^{(2nd Zaydī Imām of Idrisids in Morocco)} | Muḥammad al-Muntasir^{(11)} r. 861–862 | Ṭalḥa al-Muwaffaq^{(Regent)} 870–891 | Aḥmad al-Musta'in^{(12)} r. 862–866 | Muḥammad al-Muhtadi^{(14)} r. 869–870
Ismāʿīl ibn Yūsūf; Al-Ukhayḍhir^{ibn Ibrāhīm ibn Mūsā al-Jawn ibn ʿAbd Allāh al-Kāmīl ibn Ḥasan al-Mu'thannā} | Al-Qāsīm ar-Rassī ibn IbrāhīmṬabāṭabā^{(19th Imām of Zaydiyyā)} | Ibrahim al-Mu'ayyad^{(Wali al-Ahd & Governor of Syria)} 850–861 | Aḥmad al-Mu'tadid^{(16)} r. 892–902 | Muḥammad al-Mu'tazz^{(13)} r. 866–869 | Aḥmad al-Mu'tamid^{(15)} r. 870–892
Muḥammad ibn Yūsūf; Al-Ukhayḍhir^{(1st Zaydī Imām of Ukhaydhirites in Najd and Al-Yamama)} | ^{Abūʾl-Ḥusayn; Al-Hādī ilāʾl-Ḥaqq} Yaḥyā ibn al-Ḥusayn^{(1st Zaydī Imām of Rassids in Yemen)} | ʿAlī al-Muktafī^{(17)} r. 902–908 | Jāʿfar al-Muqtadir^{(18)} r. 908–929, 929–932 | Muḥammad al-Qāhir^{(19)} r. 929, 932–934 | Jāʿfar al-Mufawwid^{(Wali al-Ahd)} 875–892
Zayd ibn al-Ḥasan al-Mujtabā ibn ʿAlī ibn Abī Ṭālib | ʿAbd Allāh al-Mustakfī^{(22)} r. 944–946 | Al-Faḍl al-Mutīʿ^{(23)} r. 946–974 | Ishāq ibn Jāʿfar al-Muqtadir | Muḥammad al-Rādī^{(20)} r. 934–940 | Ībrāhīm al-Muttaqī^{(21)} r. 940–944
Ḥasan ibn Zayd ibn al-Ḥasan al-Mujtabā ibn ʿAlīyyū'l-Murtaḍžā | ʿUmar al-Ashraf ibn ʿAlī Zayn al-ʿĀbidīn ibn al-Ḥusayn | ʿAbd al-Karīm al-Ṭāʾiʿ^{(24)} r. 974–991 | Aḥmad al-Qāʿdīr^{(25)} r. 991–1031
Ismāʿīl ibn Ḥasan ibn Zayd ibn al-Ḥasan al-Mujtabā | ʿAlī ibn ʿUmar al-Ashraf ibn ʿAlī Zayn al-ʿĀbidīn | Al-Ḥusayn Dhu'l-Dam'a ibn Zayd ibn ʿAlī Zayn al-ʿĀbidīn | ʿAbd Allāh al-Qāʿīm^{(26)} r. 1031–1075
Muḥammad ibn Ismāʿīl ibn Ḥasan ibn Zayd | Al-Ḥasan ibn ʿAlī ibn ʿUmar al-Ashraf | Yaḥyā ibn al-Ḥusayn Dhu'l-Dam'a ibn Zayd | Muḥammad Dhakīrat ad-Dīn^{(Wali al-Ahd)} 1039–1056
Zayd ibn Muḥammad ibn Ismāʿīl ibn Ḥasan | ʿAlī ibn al-Ḥasan ibn ʿAlī ibn ʿUmar al-Ashraf | ʿUmar ibn Yaḥyā ibn al-Ḥusayn Dhu'l-Dam'a | ʿAbd Allāh al-Mūqtādī^{(27)} r. 1075–1094
^{Al-Dāʿī al-Kabīr} Hasan ibn Zayd^{(1st Zaydī Imām of Zaydīds in Tabaristan)} | ^{Al-Dāʿī al-Ṣaghīr} Muhammad ibn Zayd^{(2nd Zaydī Imām of Zaydīds in Tabaristan)} | Yaḥyā ibn ʿUmar^{(20th Imām of Zaydiyyā in Samarra)} | Aḥmad al-Mūstāzhīr^{(28)} r. 1094–1118
^{Al-Nāṣir liʾl-Ḥāqq} Hasan al-Utrush^{(3rd Zaydī Imām of Zaydīds in Tabaristan)} | Al-Faḍl al-Mūstārshīd^{(29)} r. 1118–1135
Al-Mānṣūr al-Rāshīd^{(30)} r. 1135–1136
Muḥammad al-Mūqtāfī^{(31)} r. 1136–1160 | Alī ibn al-Faḍl al-Qabī
Yūsuf al-Mūstānjīd^{(32)} r. 1160–1170 | al-Hāsān ibn Alī
Al-Hāssān al-Mūstādī'^{(33)} r. 1170–1180 | Abū Bakr ibn al-Hāsān
Aḥmad al-Nāsīr^{(34)} r. 1180–1225 | Abi 'Alī al-Hāsān ibn Abū Bakr
Muḥammad az-Zāhīr^{(35)} r. 1225–1226 | Malīka'zZāhīr Rūkn ad-Dīn Baybars^{(Mamluk Sultanate Sultan of Egypt)} r. 1260–1277
Al-Mānsūr al-Mūstānsīr^{(36)} r. 1226–1242 | Abū'l-Qāsim Aḥmad al-Mūstānsīr^{(1)} r. 1261 | Abū'l-ʿAbbās Aḥmad al-Hakim I^{(2)} r. 1262–1302
ʿAbd Allāh al-Mūstā'sīm^{(37)} r. 1242–1258 | Abū'r-Rabīʿ Sulaymān al-Mustakfī I^{(3)} r. 1302–1340 | Aḥmad ibn Aḥmad al-Ḥākim bi-amr Allāh
Abū'l-ʿAbbās Aḥmad al-Hakim II^{(5)} r. 1341–1352 | Abū'l-Fatḥ Abū Bakr al-Mu'tadid I^{(6)} r. 1352–1362 | Abū Isḥāq Ibrāhīm al-Wāṯiq I^{(4)} r. 1340–1341
Abū ʿAbd Allāh Muḥammad al-Mutawakkil I^{(7)} r. 1362–1377, 1377–1383, 1389–1406 | Abū Yāḥyā Zakariyāʾ al-Musta'sim^{(8)} r. 1377, 1386–1389 | Abū Ḥafs ʿUmar al-Wāṯiq II^{(9)} r. 1383–1386
Abū'l-Faḍl al-ʿAbbās al-Musta'īn^{(10)} r. 1406–1414; Sultan of Egypt r. 1412 | Abū'l-Fatḥ Dāwud al-Mu'tadīd II^{(11)} r. 1414–1441 | Abū'r-Rabīʿ Sulaymān al-Mustakfī II^{(12)} r. 1441–1451 | Yaʿqūb ibn Muḥammad al-Mutawakkil ʿalā'Llāh | Abū'l-Baqāʾ Ḥamza al-Qāʾim^{(13)} r. 1451–1455 | Abū'l-Maḥāsin Yūsuf al-Mustanjid^{(14)} r. 1455–1479
Abū'l-ʿIzz ʿAbd al-ʿAzīz al-Mutawakkil II^{(15)} r. 1479–1497
Abū'ṣ-Ṣabr Yaʿqūb al-Mustamsik^{(16)} r. 1497–1508, 1516–1517
Muḥammad al-Mutawakkil III^{(17)} r. 1508–1516, 1517

== Sources ==
- Aghaie, K.S. (2004). The Martyrs of Karbala: Shi'i Symbols and Rituals in Modern Iran. University of Washington Press. ISBN 0295984481.
- Aghaie, K.S. (2007). "The Passion of 'Ashura in Shiite Islam". In Cornell, V.J. (ed.). Voices of Islam. Vol. 2. Praeger. pp. 111–124. ISBN 978-0275987343.
- Amir-Moezzi, M.A.; Jambet, C. (2018). What is Sh'i Islam: An Introduction. Routledge. ISBN 9781138093737.
- Ayoub, M.M. (1978). Redemptive Suffering in Islam: A Study of the Devotional Aspects of Ashura in Twelver Shi'ism. De Gruyter. ISBN 9789027979438.
- Bahramian, A. (2015). "'Alī b. al-Ḥusayn, Abū al-Ḥasan". In Daftary, F. (ed.). Encyclopaedia Islamica. Translated by Negahban, F. doi:10.1163/1875-9831_isla_SIM_0253.
- Balyuzi, H.M. (2002). Muhammad and the Course of Islam. George Ronald. ISBN 9780853984788.
- Buhl, Fr. (2012). "Muḥammad Ibn al-Ḥanafiyya". In Bearman, P.; Bianquis, Th.; Bosworth, C.E.; van Donzel, E.; Heinrichs, W.P. (eds.). Encyclopaedia of Islam (Second ed.). doi:10.1163/1573-3912_islam_SIM_5351. ISBN 9789004161214.
- Calmard, J. (1982). "'Abbās b. 'Alī b. Abū Ṭāleb". Encyclopaedia Iranica. Vol. I/1. pp. 77–79. ISSN 2330-4804.
- Calmard, J. (1985). "'Alī Akbar". Encyclopaedia Iranica. Vol. I/8. pp. 855–856.
- Crone, P.; Hinds, M. (2003). God's Caliph: Religious Authority in the First Centuries of Islam. Cambridge University Press. ISBN 0521541115.
- Crone, P. (2005). Medieval Islamic Political Thought. Edinburgh University Press. ISBN 0748621946.
- Daftary, F. (2008). "ʿAlids". In Fleet, Kate; Krämer, G.; Matringe, D.; Nawas, J.; Stewart, D.J. (eds.). Encyclopaedia of Islam (Three ed.). doi:10.1163/1573-3912_ei3_COM_26329. ISBN 9789004171374.
- Daftary, F. (2013). A History of Shi'i Islam. I.B. Tauris. ISBN 9781780768410.
- Daftary, F. (2015). "Shi'i Communities in History". In Daftary, F.; Sajoo, A.B.; Jiwa, S. (eds.). The Shi'i World: Pathways in Tradition and Modernity. I.B. Tauris. pp. 169–209. ISBN 9781784534776.
- Dakake, M.M. (2007). The Charismatic Community: Shi'ite Identity in Early Islam. State University of New York Press. ISBN 9780791470336.
- Gifis, A. (2018). "Muhammad b. al-Hanafiyya". The Oxford Dictionary of Late Antiquity. Oxford University Press. ISBN 9780191744457.
- Gleave, R.M. (2008). "'Alī b. Abī Ṭālib". In Fleet, K.; Krämer, G.; Matringe, D.; Nawas, J.; Rowson, E. (eds.). Encyclopaedia of Islam (Third ed.). doi:10.1163/1573-3912_ei3_COM_26324. ISBN 9789004171374.
- Haider, N. (2014). Shī'ī Islam: An Introduction. Cambridge University Press. ISBN 9781107031432.
- Haider, N. (2019). The Rebel and the Imām in Early Islam: Explorations in Muslim Historiography. Cambridge University Press. ISBN 9781108708142.
- Hazleton, L. (2009). After the Prophet: The Epic Story of the Shia-Sunni Split in Islam. Doubleday. ISBN 9780385532099.
- Hawting, G.R. (2000). The First Dynasty of Islam: The Umayyad Caliphate AD 661–750 (Second ed.). Routledge. ISBN 0415240735.
- Jafri, S.H.M. (1979). Origins and Early Development of Shi'a Islam. Longman. ISBN 0582780802.
- Küng, H. (2007). Islam: Past, Present and Future. Translated by Bowden, J. Oneworld. ISBN 9781851683772.
- Lalani, A.R. (2000). Early Shī'ī Thought: The Teachings of Imam Muḥammad al-Bāqir. I.B. Tauris. ISBN 1850435928.
- Lewis, B. (2012). "'Alids". In Bearman, P.; Bianquis, Th.; Bosworth, C.E.; van Donzel, E.; Heinrichs, W.P. (eds.). Encyclopaedia of Islam (Second ed.). doi:10.1163/1573-3912_islam_SIM_0543. ISBN 9789004161214.
- Madelung, W. (1997). The Succession to Muhammad: A Study of the Early Caliphate. Cambridge University Press. ISBN 0521561817.
- Madelung, W. (2003). "Ḥasan b. 'Ali b. Abi Ṭāleb". Encyclopaedia Iranica. Vol. XII/1. pp. 26–28. ISSN 2330-4804.
- Madelung, W. (2004). "Ḥosayn b. 'Ali i. Life and Significance in Shi'ism". Encyclopaedia Iranica. Vol. XII/5. pp. 493–498. ISSN 2330-4804.
- Madelung, W. (2012). "al-Mahdī". In Bearman, P.; Bianquis, Th.; Bosworth, C.E.; van Donzel, E.; Heinrichs, W.P. (eds.). Encyclopaedia of Islam (Second ed.). doi:10.1163/1573-3912_islam_COM_0618. ISBN 9789004161214.
- Momen, M. (1985). An Introduction to Shi'i Islam. Yale University Press. ISBN 9780300035315.
- Munson, H. (1988). Islam and Revolution in the Middle East. Yale University Press. ISBN 0300041276.
- Pinault, D. (2000). "Zaynab bin 'Ali and the Place of the Women of the Households of the First Imāms in Shī'īte Devotional Literature". In Hambly, G. (ed.). Women in the Medieval Islamic World: Power, Patronage, and Piety. Macmillan. ISBN 9780333800355.
- Qutbuddin, T. (2005). "Zaynab bint 'Alī". In Jones, L. (ed.). Encyclopedia of Religion. Vol. 14 (Second ed.). Macmillan Reference USA. pp. 9937–9939. ISBN 002865983X.
- Qutbuddin, T. (2006). "Fatima (al-Zahra') bint Muhammad (ca. 12 before Hijra–11/ca. 610–632)". In Meri, J.W. (ed.). Medieval Islamic Civilization: An Encyclopedia. Vol. 1. Routledge. pp. 248–250. ISBN 9780415966917.
- Sachedina, A.A. (1981). Islamic Messianism: The Idea of the Mahdi in Twelver Shi'ism. State University of New York Press. ISBN 9780873954587.
- Shah-Kazemi, R. (2006). "'Ali ibn Abi Talib". In Meri, J.W. (ed.). Medieval Islamic Civilization: An Encyclopedia. Vol. 1. Routledge. pp. 36–37. ISBN 9780415966917.
- Sharon, M. (1983). Black Banners from the East: The Establishment of the 'Abbāsid State: Incubation of a Revolt. Magnes Press. ISBN 9652235016.
- Tabatabai, S.M.H. (1975). Shi'ite Islam. Translated by Nasr, S.H. State University of New York Press. ISBN 0873953908.
- Veccia Vaglieri, L. (2012a). "(al-)Ḥasan b. 'Alī b. Abī Ṭālib". In Bearman, P.; Bianquis, Th.; Bosworth, C.E.; van Donzel, E.; Heinrichs, W.P. (eds.). Encyclopaedia of Islam (Second ed.). doi:10.1163/1573-3912_islam_COM_0272. ISBN 9789004161214.
- Wellhausen, J. (1901). Die religiös-politischen Oppositionsparteien im alten Islam (in German). Weidmannsche Buchhandlung. OCLC 453206240.

Muhammad ibn al-Hanafiyya of the Ahl al-Bayt Banu Hashim Clan of the Banu Quraish Born: ≈ AD 633 Died: ≈ 700
Shia Islam titles
| Preceded by Husayn ibn Ali | 4th Imam of Kaysanites Shia; 681–? | Succeeded by Abu Hashim |
