= Sallamah Umm Abdallah =

Main ancestor of Abbasid dynasty

Sallamah سلامة
- Born: Tunisia
- Died: Humeima
- Burial place: Humeima
- Other names: Umm Abdallah أم عبدالله
- Known for: Ancestor of Abbasid dynasty
- Spouse: Muhammad ibn Ali
- Children: Abu Ja'far Abdallah
- Relatives: Abu al-‘Abbās Abdallah (step-son); Ja'far (grandson) al-Mahdi (grandson)
- Family: Banu Abbas, Banu Hashim (by marriage)

Sallamah Umm Abdallah (Arabic: سلَّامة أم عبد الله) was the main ancestor of the Abbasid dynasty. She was the wife or concubine of Muhammad al-Imam, and the mother of Abdallah, who became the second Abbasid caliph as al-Mansur.

== Life ==
Sallamah was the consort of Muhammad ibn Ali. She was from Kairouan in Tunisia from a Berber race. She married Muhammad in 713/714. She was the Ancestor of Abbasids. She was related to All Abbasid caliphs, except Al-Saffah who was her step son. It is a dispute whether she was Muhammad's wife or just a concubine, however According to Al-Suyuti's History of the Caliphs, Al-Mansur lived 95 AH – 158 AH (714 AD – 6 October 775 AD). Abdallah was born at the home of the Abbasid family in Humeima (modern-day Jordan) after their emigration from the Hejaz in 714 (95 AH). Al-Mansur's mother is reported to be a Berber slave. Sallamah was possibly captured during Conquest of the Maghreb by Umayyads and was later brought by Muhammad.

Her Husband, Muhammad ibn Ali ibn Abdallah was the son of Ali ibn Abd Allah ibn al-Abbas and great-grandson of al-‘Abbas ibn ‘Abd al-Muttalib, the uncle of the Islamic prophet, Muhammad. He was born in Humeima in Jordan, he was the father of the two first 'Abbâsid caliphs, As-Saffah and Al-Mansur, and as such was the progenitor of the Abbasid dynasty. Sallamah died in 740s shortly after her husband died.

== Descendants ==
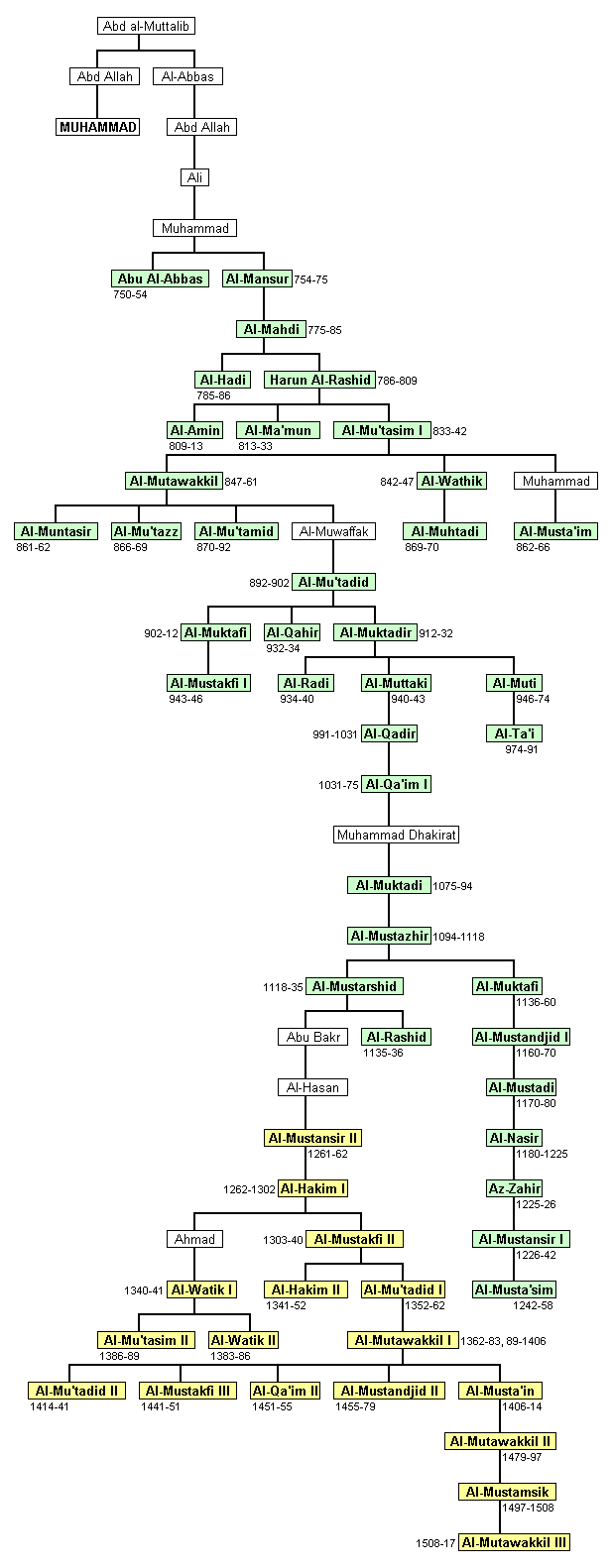
Genealogical tree of the Abbasid dynasty. In green, the Abbasid caliphs. In yellow, the Caliphs of Mamluk Cairo. Muhammad is included (in caps) to show the kinship of the Abbasids with him. Sallamah was the common ancestor of Abbasid caliphs and she was the ancestor of entire Abbasid dynasty

== See also ==
- Banu Hashim

== Sources ==
- al-Masudi. The Meadows of Gold, The Abbasids. transl. Paul Lunde and Caroline Stone, Kegan Paul, London and New York, 1989.
- Al-Suyuti. History of the Caliphs.
