= Muhammad ibn Ali ibn Abdallah =

Founder of the Abbasid dynasty (c. 680–743)

Muhammad ibn Ali ibn Abd Allah محمد بن علي بن عبد الله
- Born: c. 671; Humayma, al-Sharat, Umayyad Caliphate
- Died: August/September 743; Humayma, al-Sharat (modern-day Jordan)
- Known for: Ancestor of Abbasid dynasty
- Spouses: Rayta bint Ubayd Allah al-Harithiyya; Sallamah Umm Abdallah
- Children: Abu Ishaq Ibrahim, Abu Ja'far Abd Allah, Abu'l-Abbas Abdallah
- Parent: ʿAlī ibn ʿAbd Allāh (father)
- Relatives: Abd Allah ibn Ali (brother); Salih ibn Ali (brother); Sulayman ibn Ali (brother); ʿĪsā ibn Mūsā (grandson)

Muḥammad ibn ʿAlī ibn ʿAbd Allāh ibn ʿal-ʿAbbās (Note: Arabic: محمد بن علي بن عبد الله) or Muḥammad al-Imām (679/80–743) was the father of the two first 'Abbâsid caliphs, Al-Saffah and Al-Mansur, and as such was the progenitor of the Abbasid dynasty.

He was the son of Ali ibn Abd Allah ibn al-Abbas and great-grandson of al-‘Abbas ibn ‘Abd al-Muttalib, the uncle of the Islamic prophet, Muhammad.

== Abbasid Da'wa ==
Muhammad ibn Ali was the leader of the Abbasid da'wa during the Umayyad Caliphate. He was informed by Abu Hashim that the Caliphate would belong to the Ahl al-Bayt, and he began the mission accordingly. After his death, his son Ibrahim ibn Muhammad succeeded him, but when the last Umayyad caliph Marwan ibn Muhammad learned of his status and location, he had him arrested and imprisoned, where he eventually died. He was succeeded by his brother Abu al-Abbas al-Saffah, who openly proclaimed the da'wa for the first time, established the Abbasid Caliphate, and seized the Caliphate.

Muhammad ibn Ali was a pious and scholarly man. He was likely born in the village of Humayma in Jordan and dedicated himself to religious study and devotion. In Humayma, he owned about five hundred trees, under each of which he would pray two rak'ahs. He taught his sons both knowledge and worship. He bore the title "al-Sajjad" (the one who prostrates frequently), which distinguished him from Ali Zayn al-Abidin. He was fourteen and a half years younger than his father, and people often could not distinguish between him and his father until he dyed his beard with henna while his father dyed his black.

== Revolt of Mukhtar al-Thaqafi ==
When al-Mukhtar announced the revenge of Imam al-Husayn, he positioned himself as the representative of Muhammad ibn al-Hanafiyyah, whom he proclaimed to be the Mahdi.

== Imam of the Hashimiyya ==
After the death of Muhammad ibn al-Hanafiyyah, the imamate of the Kaysanite Shia transferred to his son Abu Hashim, who transferred it to Muhammad, effectively transferring the mantle of leadership to him. This transfer allowed the Hashimiyya sect, a branch of the Kaysanites, to serve as a network of support for the Abbasid da'wa. The Hashimiyya were secretive and organized, spreading Abbasid propaganda against the Umayyad Caliphate and cultivating loyalty among key tribes and supporters. Their efforts laid the groundwork for the eventual Abbasid Revolution, which overthrew the Umayyads and established the Abbasid Caliphate in 750 CE.

== Death and succession ==
Muhammad ibn Ali died in the year 125 AH at the age of 72. After his death, his son Ibrahim ibn Muhammad succeeded him in leading the Abbasid da'wa, continuing the mission to gather support against the Umayyad Caliphate. Under Ibrahim’s leadership, the Abbasid call continued to grow, setting the stage for his brother Abu al-Abbas al-Saffah to publicly proclaim the da'wa and ultimately establish the Abbasid Caliphate.

== Family tree ==
Quraysh tribe
Waqida bint Amr	Abd Manaf ibn Qusai	Ātikah bint Murrah
Nawfal ibn Abd Manaf	‘Abd Shams	Barra	Hala	Muṭṭalib ibn Abd Manaf	Hashim	Salma bint Amr
Umayya ibn Abd Shams	ʿAbd al-Muṭṭalib
Harb	Abū al-ʿĀs	ʿĀminah	ʿAbdallāh	Hamza	Abī Ṭālib	Az-Zubayr	al-ʿAbbās	Abū Lahab
ʾAbī Sufyān ibn Harb	al-Ḥakam	ʿUthmān	ʿAffān	MUHAMMAD (Family tree)	Khadija bint Khuwaylid	ʿAlī (Family tree)	Khawlah bint Ja'far	Ibn Abbas
Muʿāwiyah I	Marwān I	ʿUthmān ibn ʿAffān	Ruqayya	Fatimah	Muhammad ibn al-Hanafiyyah	ʿAli ibn ʿAbdallāh
Sufyanids	Marwanids	al-Ḥasan	al-Ḥusayn (Family tree)	Abu Hasim (Imām of al-Mukhtār and Hashimiyya)	Muhammad "al-Imām" (Abbasids)
Ibrāhim "al-Imām"	al-Saffāḥ	al-Mansur

The genealogy of the Abbasids including their rival Zaydi imams

Abbasids

Caliphs of the Abbasid Caliphate
Caliphs of Cairo
Zaydi imams

ʿAbd al-Muṭṭalib
ibn ʿHāshīm

ʾAbū Ṭālib
ibn ʿAbd al-Muṭṭalib

Abū'l-Fādl
al-ʿAbbās ibn
ʿAbd al-Muṭṭalib

ʿAbd Allāh ibn
ʿAbd al-Muṭṭalib

ʿAlīyyū'l-Murtaḍžā
^{(1st Imām of Kaysāniyyā, Zaydīyyā, Imāmiyyā)}

Hibr al-Ummah
ʿAbd Allāh
ibn al-ʿAbbās

Khātam
al-Nabiyyin
Abū'l-Qāsīm
Muḥammad
ibn ʿAbd Allāh

Al-Ḥasan al-Mujtabā
^{(2nd Imām of Kaysāniyyā, Zaydīyyā, Imāmiyyā)}

Hussayn ibn Ali
^{(3rd Imām of Kaysāniyyā, Zaydīyyā, Imāmiyyā)}

Abū'l-Qāsīm Muḥammad
al-Hānafīyya
^{(4th Imām of Kaysāniyyā)}

ʿAlī ibn
ʿAbd Allāh
al-Sajjad

Al-Ḥasan al-Mu'thannā
^{(5th Imām of Zaydiyyā)}

Ali al-Sajjad
(Zayn al-ʿĀbidīn)
^{(4th Imām of Zaydiyyā, Imāmiyyā)}

Abū Hāshīm
ʿAbd Allāh ibn Muḥammad
^{(5th Imām of Hāsheemīyyā)}

Muḥammad
"al-Imām"
^{(6th Imām of Hāsheemīyyā)}
716/7 - 743

^{(The Governors)}
- ʿAbd Allāh ibn ʿAlī
  ^{(Bilad al-Sham of Syria; 750–754)}
- Abd al-Sāmad
  ^{(Medina and Mecca; 772–776 & Jazira; 780)}

^{(The Governors)}
- Ṣāliḥ ibn ʿAlī
  ^{(Egypt; 750–751)}
- Sulayman
  ^{(Bahrayn, Oman, Tigris districts, Mihrajanqadhaq; 750–755 & Amir al-hajj; 753)}

ʿAbd Allāh al-Kāmīl ibn al-Ḥasan al-Mu'thannā

Zayd ibn Ali
^{(6th Imām of Zaydiyyā)}

Ibrāhim (Ebrāheem)
"al-Imām"
^{(7th Imām of Hāsheemīyyā)}
743 - 749

Abū Jāʿfar
ʿAbd Allāh
al-Mānṣūr
^{(2)}
r. 754–775

Abū'l-ʿAbbās
ʿAbd Allāh
as-Saffāh
^{(1)}
r. 750–754

Mūsā ibn Muḥammad "al-Imām"

Nafsū'zZakiyya
^{(First elected caliph by Ibrāhim, Mānṣūr, Saffāh, Imām Mālīk & Abū Ḥanīfa)}
^{(8th Imām of Zaydiyyā)}

Yahya ibn Zayd
^{(7th Imām of Zaydiyyā)}

Abū Muslīm al-Khurāsānī
^{(Governor of Khurasan)}
748–755

Muḥammad
al-Mahdī
^{(3)}
r. 775–785

Jāʿfar
^{(Wali al-Ahd & Governor of Mosul)}
762–764

ʿĪsā ibn Mūsā
^{(Governor of Kufa)}
750–765

ʿAbd Allāh
Shāh Ghāzī
(ʿAbd Allāh ibn Muḥammad)
^{(10th Imām of Zaydiyyā)}

Ibrāhīm ibn ʿAbd Allāh al-Kāmīl ibn al-Ḥasan al-Mu'thannā
^{ibn Ḥasan al-Mujtabā}
^{(9th Imām of Zaydiyyā)}

Al-Ḥusayn ibn ʿAlī al-ʿĀbid ibn al-Ḥasan al-Mu'thallath
^{ibn Ḥasan al-Mu'thannā}
^{(12th Imām of Zaydiyyā)}

Hārūn
ar-Rāshīd
^{(5)}
r. 786–809

ʿMūsā
al-Hādī
^{(4)}
r. 785–786

^{(The Governors)}
- Mūsā ^{(Kufa, Egypt & Medina)}
- Ismā'īl
  ^{(Egypt)}
- Dā'wūd
^{(Medina)}

Sulaymān
^{ibn ʿAbd Allāh al-Kāmīl ibn al-Ḥasan II}
^{(Emir of Tlemcen)}
^{(Sulaymanid dynasty of Western Algeria)}

Yaḥyā
^{ibn ʿAbd Allāh al-Kāmīl ibn al-Ḥasan al-Mu'thannā}
^{(14th Imām of Zaydiyyā)}

Ibrāhīm Ṭabāṭabā
^{ibn Ismāʿīl al-Dībādj ibn Ibrāhīm al-Ghamr ibn
al-Ḥasan al-Mu'thannā}

Muḥammad
al-Mu'tasim
^{(8)}
r. 833–842

Abd Allāh
al-Ma'mun
^{(7)}
r. 813–833

Muḥammad
al-Amin
^{(6)}
r. 809–813

Sūlaymān
^{ibn ʿAbd Allāh as-Sālih ibn Mūsā al-Jawn ibn ʿAbd Allāh al-Kāmīl ibn al-Ḥasan al-Mu'thannā}

Idrīs the Elder ibn ʿAbd Allāh
^{(Idrisid dynasty of Morocco)}
^{(15th Imām of Zaydiyyā)}

Muḥammad ibn IbrāhīmṬabāṭabā
^{(16th Imām of Zaydiyyā)}

Jāʿfar al-Mutawakkil
^{(10)}
r. 847–861

Muḥammad ibn Muḥammad
al-Mu'tasim

Hārūn
al-Wathiq
^{(9)}
r. 842–847

Mūsā II
^{ibn ʿAbd Allāh as-Sâlih ibn Mūsā al-Jawn ibn ʿAbd Allāh al-Kāmīl}

Idrīs ibn Idrīs
^{(2nd Zaydī Imām of Idrisids in Morocco)}

Muḥammad
al-Muntasir
^{(11)}
r. 861–862

Ṭalḥa al-Muwaffaq
^{(Regent)}
870–891

Aḥmad
al-Musta'in
^{(12)}
r. 862–866

Muḥammad
al-Muhtadi
^{(14)}
r. 869–870

Ismāʿīl ibn Yūsūf
Al-Ukhayḍhir
^{ibn Ibrāhīm ibn Mūsā al-Jawn ibn ʿAbd Allāh al-Kāmīl ibn Ḥasan al-Mu'thannā}

Al-Qāsīm
ar-Rassī ibn IbrāhīmṬabāṭabā
^{(19th Imām of Zaydiyyā)}

Ibrahim al-Mu'ayyad
^{(Wali al-Ahd & Governor of Syria)}
850–861

Aḥmad
al-Mu'tadid
^{(16)}
r. 892–902

Muḥammad
al-Mu'tazz
^{(13)}
r. 866–869

Aḥmad
al-Mu'tamid
^{(15)}
r. 870–892

Muḥammad ibn Yūsūf
Al-Ukhayḍhir
^{(1st Zaydī Imām of Ukhaydhirites in Najd and Al-Yamama)}

^{Abūʾl-Ḥusayn
Al-Hādī ilāʾl-Ḥaqq}
Yaḥyā ibn
al-Ḥusayn
^{(1st Zaydī Imām of Rassids in Yemen)}

ʿAlī
al-Muktafī
^{(17)}
r. 902–908

Jāʿfar
al-Muqtadir
^{(18)}
r. 908–929,
929–932

Muḥammad
al-Qāhir
^{(19)}
r. 929, 932–934

Jāʿfar al-Mufawwid
^{(Wali al-Ahd)}
875–892

Zayd ibn al-Ḥasan al-Mujtabā ibn ʿAlī ibn Abī Ṭālib

ʿAbd Allāh
al-Mustakfī
^{(22)}
r. 944–946

Al-Faḍl
al-Mutīʿ
^{(23)}
r. 946–974

Ishāq ibn Jāʿfar al-Muqtadir

Muḥammad
al-Rādī
^{(20)}
r. 934–940

Ībrāhīm
al-Muttaqī
^{(21)}
r. 940–944

Ḥasan ibn Zayd ibn al-Ḥasan al-Mujtabā ibn ʿAlīyyū'l-Murtaḍžā

ʿUmar al-Ashraf ibn ʿAlī Zayn al-ʿĀbidīn ibn al-Ḥusayn

ʿAbd al-Karīm
al-Ṭāʾiʿ
^{(24)}
r. 974–991

Aḥmad
al-Qāʿdīr
^{(25)}
r. 991–1031

Ismāʿīl ibn Ḥasan ibn Zayd ibn al-Ḥasan al-Mujtabā

ʿAlī ibn ʿUmar al-Ashraf ibn ʿAlī Zayn al-ʿĀbidīn

Al-Ḥusayn Dhu'l-Dam'a ibn Zayd ibn ʿAlī Zayn al-ʿĀbidīn

ʿAbd Allāh
al-Qāʿīm
^{(26)}
r. 1031–1075

Muḥammad ibn Ismāʿīl ibn Ḥasan ibn Zayd

Al-Ḥasan ibn ʿAlī ibn ʿUmar al-Ashraf

Yaḥyā ibn al-Ḥusayn Dhu'l-Dam'a ibn Zayd

Muḥammad Dhakīrat ad-Dīn
^{(Wali al-Ahd)}
1039–1056

Zayd ibn Muḥammad ibn Ismāʿīl ibn Ḥasan

ʿAlī ibn al-Ḥasan ibn ʿAlī ibn ʿUmar al-Ashraf

ʿUmar ibn Yaḥyā ibn al-Ḥusayn Dhu'l-Dam'a

ʿAbd Allāh
al-Mūqtādī
^{(27)}
r. 1075–1094

^{Al-Dāʿī al-Kabīr}
Hasan ibn Zayd
^{(1st Zaydī Imām of Zaydīds in Tabaristan)}

^{Al-Dāʿī al-Ṣaghīr}
Muhammad ibn Zayd
^{(2nd Zaydī Imām of Zaydīds in Tabaristan)}

Yaḥyā ibn ʿUmar
^{(20th Imām of Zaydiyyā in Samarra)}

Aḥmad
al-Mūstāzhīr
^{(28)}
r. 1094–1118

^{Al-Nāṣir liʾl-Ḥāqq}
Hasan al-Utrush
^{(3rd Zaydī Imām of Zaydīds in Tabaristan)}

Al-Faḍl al-Mūstārshīd
^{(29)}
r. 1118–1135

Al-Mānṣūr
al-Rāshīd
^{(30)}
r. 1135–1136

Muḥammad
al-Mūqtāfī
^{(31)}
r. 1136–1160

Alī ibn al-Faḍl
al-Qabī

Yūsuf
al-Mūstānjīd
^{(32)}
r. 1160–1170

al-Hāsān
ibn Alī

Al-Hāssān
al-Mūstādī'
^{(33)}
r. 1170–1180

Abū Bakr
ibn al-Hāsān

Aḥmad
al-Nāsīr
^{(34)}
r. 1180–1225

Abi 'Alī al-Hāsān ibn Abū Bakr

Muḥammad
az-Zāhīr
^{(35)}
r. 1225–1226

Malīka'zZāhīr Rūkn ad-Dīn Baybars
^{(Mamluk Sultanate Sultan of Egypt)}
r. 1260–1277

Al-Mānsūr
al-Mūstānsīr
^{(36)}
r. 1226–1242

Abū'l-Qāsim Aḥmad
al-Mūstānsīr
^{(1)}
r. 1261

Abū'l-ʿAbbās Aḥmad
al-Hakim I
^{(2)}
r. 1262–1302

ʿAbd Allāh
al-Mūstā'sīm
^{(37)}
r. 1242–1258

Abū'r-Rabīʿ Sulaymān
al-Mustakfī I
^{(3)}
r. 1302–1340

Aḥmad ibn Aḥmad
al-Ḥākim bi-amr Allāh

Abū'l-ʿAbbās Aḥmad
al-Hakim II
^{(5)}
r. 1341–1352

Abū'l-Fatḥ Abū Bakr
al-Mu'tadid I
^{(6)}
r. 1352–1362

Abū Isḥāq Ibrāhīm
al-Wāṯiq I
^{(4)}
r. 1340–1341

Abū ʿAbd Allāh Muḥammad
al-Mutawakkil I
^{(7)}
r. 1362–1377,
1377–1383,
1389–1406

Abū Yāḥyā Zakariyāʾ
al-Musta'sim
^{(8)}
r. 1377,
1386–1389

Abū Ḥafs ʿUmar
al-Wāṯiq II
^{(9)}
r. 1383–1386

Abū'l-Faḍl al-ʿAbbās
al-Musta'īn
^{(10)}
r. 1406–1414
Sultan of Egypt
r. 1412

Abū'l-Fatḥ Dāwud
al-Mu'tadīd II
^{(11)}
r. 1414–1441

Abū'r-Rabīʿ Sulaymān
al-Mustakfī II
^{(12)}
r. 1441–1451

Yaʿqūb ibn Muḥammad
al-Mutawakkil ʿalā'Llāh

Abū'l-Baqāʾ Ḥamza
al-Qāʾim
^{(13)}
r. 1451–1455

Abū'l-Maḥāsin Yūsuf
al-Mustanjid
^{(14)}
r. 1455–1479

Abū'l-ʿIzz ʿAbd al-ʿAzīz
al-Mutawakkil II
^{(15)}
r. 1479–1497

Abū'ṣ-Ṣabr Yaʿqūb
al-Mustamsik
^{(16)}
r. 1497–1508,
1516–1517

Muḥammad
al-Mutawakkil III
^{(17)}
r. 1508–1516,
1517

== Sources ==
- Hawting, Gerald R. (2000). The First Dynasty of Islam: The Umayyad Caliphate AD 661–750 (Second ed.). London and New York: Routledge. ISBN 0-415-24072-7.
- Kennedy, H. (1993). "Muḥammad b. ʿAlī b. ʿAbd Allāh". In Bosworth, C. E.; van Donzel, E.; Heinrichs, W. P. & Pellat, Ch. (eds.). The Encyclopaedia of Islam, Second Edition. Volume VII: Mif–Naz. Leiden: E. J. Brill. p. 396. doi:10.1163/1573-3912_islam_SIM_5342. ISBN 978-90-04-09419-2.
- Moscati, S. (1960). "Abū Muslim". In Gibb, H. A. R.; Kramers, J. H.; Lévi-Provençal, E.; Schacht, J.; Lewis, B. & Pellat, Ch. (eds.). The Encyclopaedia of Islam, Second Edition. Volume I: A–B. Leiden: E. J. Brill. p. 141. doi:10.1163/1573-3912_islam_SIM_0235. OCLC 495469456.
- Sharon, Moshe (1983). Black Banners from the East. The Establishment of the ʿAbbāsid State – Incubation of a Revolt. Jerusalem: The Magnes Press. ISBN 965-223-501-6.
- Sharon, Moshe (1990). Black Banners from the East, Volume II. Revolt: The Social and Military Aspects of the ʿAbbāsid Revolution. Jerusalem: Graph Press Ltd. ISBN 965-223-388-9.

Muhammad "al-Imām" Banu Hashim Clan of the Quraysh Died: August/September 743
Shia Islam titles
Preceded by Abu Hashim	Imam of the Hashimiyya; 716/7–743	Succeeded by Ibrahim al-Imam
