= Hasan ibn Muhammad ibn al-Hanafiyya =

Salaf and Hadith narrator (died c. 718 CE)

Al-Ḥasan ibn Muḥammad ibn al-Ḥanafiyya (Arabic: الحسن بن محمد بن الحنفية) (died 718 CE / 100 AH) was an early Islamic scholar, one of the Salaf, and an early narrator of hadith.

He was the son of Muhammad ibn al-Hanafiyya and the grandson of the Caliph Ali. Following the death of Husayn, his only surviving son, Ali al-Sajjad, retired to an apolitical life in Medina, leaving al-Hasan's father to be considered by many as the head of the House of Ali. During the final crisis of Mukhtar al-Thaqafi's revolt in Kufa in 687, al-Hasan decided to join the movement, though he arrived too late and traveled onward to Nisibis where a resistance group led by Abū Karib Budayr ibn Abi Sakhr fought against the troops of al-Muhallab ibn Abi Sufra, who supported Abd Allah ibn al-Zubayr. He was captured and imprisoned by Ibn al-Zubayr, but managed to escape to his father in Mina.

When his father eventually decided to pledge allegiance to the Umayyad caliph Abd al-Malik ibn Marwan in 693 following the collapse of Ibn al-Zubayr's caliphate, al-Hasan drew the most prominent consequences from this step. He composed an open letter, later known as his Kitāb al-Irjā, in which he implicitly declared Mukhtar's allegiance to his father to have been an intrusion and imposture, while pleading for postponing judgment upon "those who first participated in the schism of the community", namely Uthman and his own grandfather Ali. This stance reflected a rejection of the sectarian views held by remaining followers of Mukhtar in Kufa, and recognized Abd al-Malik's reconciliatory policies. Al-Hasan had his letter recited in various places by Abd al-Wahid ibn Ayman, a Meccan mawla. Later in life, he also participated in the major anti-Umayyad revolt led by Ibn al-Ash'ath.

== Sources ==
- Ess, J. van (2004). "al-Ḥasan b. Muḥammad b. al-Ḥanafiyya". In Bearman, P. J.; Bianquis, Th.; Bosworth, C. E.; van Donzel, E. & Heinrichs, W. P. (eds.). The Encyclopaedia of Islam, Second Edition. Volume XII: Supplement. Leiden: E. J. Brill. pp. 357–358. ISBN 978-90-04-13974-9.
- Buhl, Fr. (2012). "Muḥammad Ibn al-Ḥanafiyya". In Bearman, P.; Bianquis, Th.; Bosworth, C.E.; van Donzel, E.; Heinrichs, W.P. (eds.). Encyclopaedia of Islam (Second ed.). doi:10.1163/1573-3912_islam_SIM_5351. ISBN 9789004161214.
- Balyuzi, H.M. (2002). Muhammad and the Course of Islam. George Ronald. ISBN 9780853984788.
- Momen, M. (1985). An Introduction to Shi'i Islam. Yale University Press. ISBN 9780300035315.
