= Al-Mansur =

2nd Abbasid caliph (r. 754–775)

Al-Mansur المنصور
- Khalifah; Amir al-Mu'minin
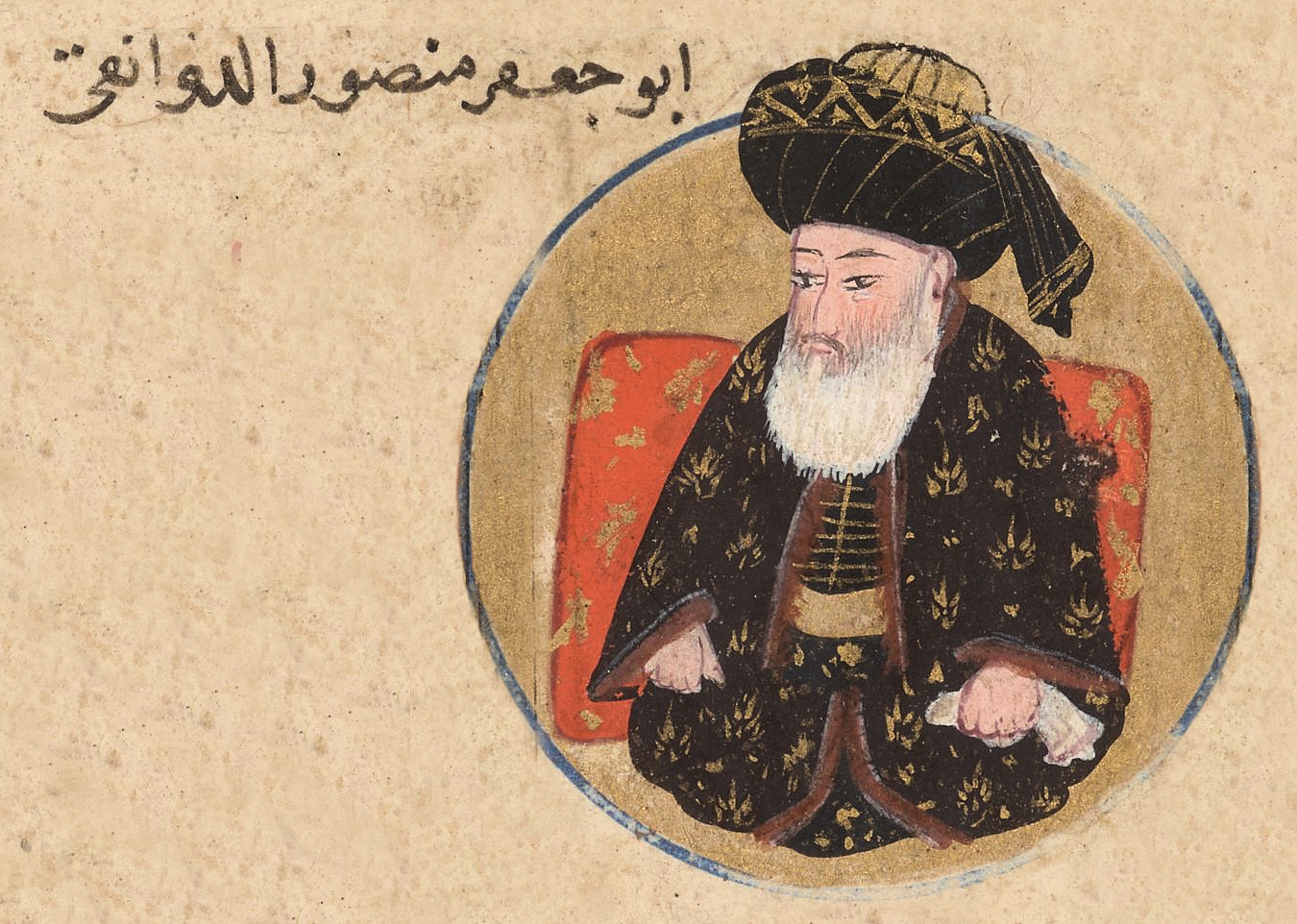
- Abbāsid Caliph al-Manṣūr from the genealogy (silsilanāma), "Cream of Histories" (Zübdet-üt Tevarih, 1598)

2nd Caliph of the Abbasid Caliphate
- Reign: 10 June 754 – 6 October 775
- Predecessor: al-Saffah
- Successor: al-Mahdi
- Born: c. 714; Humayma, Umayyad Caliphate
- Died: 6 October 775 (aged 61) near Mecca, Abbasid Caliphate
- Burial: al-Ma'lat Cemetery
- Consorts: Arwa bint Mansur; Hammadah bint Isa; Fatimah bint Muhammad; Qāli al-Farrāshah; Umm al-Qasim
- Issue: Ja'far; al-Mahdi; Sulayman; Aliyah; see more
- Dynasty: Abbasid
- Father: Muhammad ibn Ali
- Mother: Sallamah
- Religion: Sunni Islam

Abū Jaʿfar ʿAbd Allāh ibn Muḥammad al-Manṣūr (/ælmænˈsʊər/; Arabic: أبو جعفر عبد الله بن محمد المنصور; 714 – 6 October 775) usually known simply as by his laqab al-Manṣūr (المنصور) was the second Abbasid caliph, reigning from 754 to 775 after succeeding his brother al-Saffah (r. 750–754). He consolidated Abbasid rule following the Abbasid revolution and is regarded by modern historians as the real founder of the Abbasid Caliphate for his role in stabilizing and institutionalizing the dynasty. He founded the Round City of Madinat al-Salam in 762, which became the core of imperial Baghdad and the capital of the caliphate.

== Background and early life ==
Al-Mansur was born in 714 (95 AH) at Humayma (in modern-day Jordan), where the Abbasid family had settled after emigrating from the Hejaz. His mother was Sallamah, a slave woman. Al-Mansur was a brother of al-Saffah. Both were named Abd Allah, and to distinguish between them, al-Saffah was referred to by his kunya Abu al-Abbas.

Al-Mansur was a great-great-grandson of Abbas ibn Abd al-Muttalib, an uncle of the Islamic prophet, Muhammad. Al-Mansur's brother al-Saffah began asserting his claim to the caliphate in the 740s and became particularly active in Khorasan. After the death of the Umayyad caliph Hisham ibn Abd al-Malik in 743, a period of instability followed. Al-Saffah led the Abbasid revolution in 747, and his claim to power was supported throughout Iraq. He became the first caliph of the Abbasid Caliphate in 750 after defeating his rivals.

The Abbasid Revolution was organized through an extensive clandestine network that mobilized support for the Abbasid cause, particularly in Khorasan, where the movement's military forces emerged. Shortly before the overthrow of the Umayyads, the Umayyad caliph Marwan II arrested the head of the Abbasid family, al-Mansur's older brother Ibrahim. Al-Mansur fled with the rest of his family to Kufa, where several leaders of the Khorasani army pledged their allegiance to his brother al-Saffah. Ibrahim died in captivity, and al-Saffah became caliph. During his brother's reign, al-Mansur led an army into Mesopotamia, where he received the submission of the local governor after informing him of the Umayyad caliph's death. The governor had taken refuge in a garrison town in Iraq. Although al-Mansur and al-Saffah promised him safe conduct, he was executed along with several of his followers after surrendering the town.

According to The Meadows of Gold, a history book in Arabic written around 947 AD, al-Mansur's dislike of the Umayyad dynasty is well documented and he has been reported saying:

The Umayyads held the government which had been given to them with a firm hand, protecting, preserving and guarding the gift granted them by God. But then their power passed to their effeminate sons, whose only ambition was the satisfaction of their desires and who chased after pleasures forbidden by Almighty God...Then God stripped them of their power, covered them with shame and deprived them of their worldly goods.

Mansur's first wife was a Yemeni woman from a royal family; his second was a descendant of a hero of the early Muslim conquests; his third was an Iranian servant. He also had a minimum of three concubines: an Arab, a Byzantine, nicknamed the "restless butterfly," and a Kurd.

== Caliphate ==
=== Accession to the caliphate ===
Al-Saffah died after a short five-year reign and al-Mansur took on the responsibility of establishing the Abbasid caliphate by holding on to power for nearly 22 years, from AD 754 until AD 775 (Dhu al-Hijjah AH 136 – Dhu al-Hijjah 158). Al-Mansur was proclaimed Caliph on his way to Mecca in 753 (136 AH) and was inaugurated the following year. Abu Ja'far Abdallah ibn Muhammad took the name al-Mansur ("the victorious") (Note: According to Marshall Hodgson, the name al-Mansur, like that of his predecessor al-Saffah, had "eschatological overtones, […] implying that the caliph was singled out for divine help in his victories." Al-Mansur made it customary among his descendants to take such "exalted surnames" by naming his son al-Mahdi, which is what the Shi'ites called the figure they expected to appear one day and restore Islamic justice.) and agreed to make his nephew Isa ibn Musa his successor to the Abbasid caliphate. This agreement was supposed to resolve rivalries in the Abbasid family, but al-Mansur's right to accession was challenged by his uncle Abd Allah ibn Ali. Once in power as caliph, al-Mansur had his uncle imprisoned in 754 and killed in 764.

=== Execution of Abu Muslim and aftermath ===
Relations deteriorated quickly between new caliph and general Abu Muslim, when al-Mansur sent his chamberlain Abu-al Khasib to inventory the spoils of war, and then appointed Abu Muslim governor of Syria and Egypt, outside his powerbase. After an increasingly acrimonious correspondence between Abu Muslim and al-Mansur, Abu Muslim feared he was going to be killed if he appeared in the presence of the Caliph. He later changed his mind and decided to appear in his presence due to a combination of perceived disobedience, al-Mansur's promise to keep him as governor of Khorasan, and the assurances of some of his close aides, some of whom were bribed by al-Mansur. He went to Iraq to meet al-Mansur in al-Mada'in in 755. Al-Mansur proceeded to enumerate his grievances against Abu Muslim, who kept reminding the Caliph of his efforts to enthrone him. Against Abu Muslim were also charges of being a zindiq or heretic.

Fearing the increasing power of the Abbasid general Abu Muslim, who had gained popularity among the people, al-Mansur carefully planned his assassination. Abu Muslim was conversing with the Caliph when, at an appointed signal, four (some sources say five) of his guards rushed in and fatally wounded the general. Al-Mansur had the mutilated corpse thown into the Tigris and bribed Abu Muslim's generals into accepting the murder as a fait accompli. Al-Mansur justified the murder to the people in a khutba, stating that anyone who broke his allegiance to the caliph was worthy of death.

The execution of Abu Muslim caused uproar throughout the province of Khorasan. In 755 Sunpadh, an Iranian nobleman from the House of Karen, led a revolt against al-Mansur, taking the cities of Nishapur, Qumis, and Ray. In Ray, he seized the treasures of Abu Muslim. He gained many supporters from Jibal and Tabaristan, including the Dabuyid ruler, Khurshid, who was paid with money from the treasures. Al-Mansur ordered a force of 10,000 under Abbasid commander Jahwar ibn Marrar al-Ijli to march without delay to Khorasan to put down the rebellion. Sunpadh was defeated, and Khorasan was reclaimed by the Abbasids.

=== Administration in Eastern parts of the empire ===
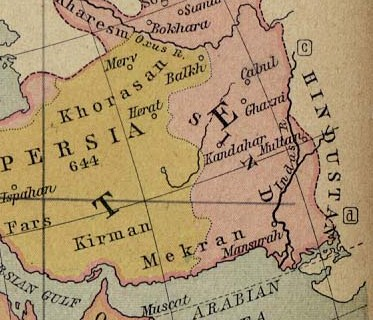
Khorasan and other territories during the Caliphate in 750s.

Al-Mansur sent an official to take inventory of the spoils collected from the battle as a precautionary measure against its distribution to the army. Angered by al-Mansur's avarice, Jahwar gained support from his troops for his plans to split the treasures evenly, and revolted against the caliph. This raised alarm in the caliph's court, and al-Mansur ordered Muhammad ibn Ashar to march towards Khorasan. Jahwar, knowing his troops were at a disadvantage, retired to Isfahan and fortified in preparation. Muhammad's army pressed the rebel forces, and Jahwar fled to Azerbaijan. Jahwar's forces were defeated, but he escaped Muhammad's pursuit. This campaign lasted from 756 to 762 AD (138 to 144 AH). In 759, al-Mansur sent an army under his generals Abu al-Khasib Marzuq and Khazim ibn Khuzayma to Tabaristan to punish Khurshid for his support of Sunpadh. Khurshid was defeated and Abu al-Khasib was appointed as the governor of the region.

After relieving former vizier Ibn Attiya al-Bahili, al-Mansur transferred his duties to Abu Ayyub al-Muriyani from Khuzestan. Abu Ayyub had been a secretary to Sulayman ibn Habib ibn al-Muhallab, who in the past had condemned al-Mansur to be flogged. Abu Ayyub had rescued al-Mansur from this punishment. Nevertheless, after appointing him as vizier, al-Mansur suspected Abu Ayyub of various crimes, including extortion and treachery, which led to the latter's assassination. The secretary role was granted to Aban ibn Sadaqa until caliph al-Mansur' death.

During the reign of al-Mansur, in 767 AD/150 AH a new Persian rebellion broke out in Badghis, under a leader called Ashinas. The rebellion aimed to achieve the principles and motives of Behafarid, whose movement was suppressed by the Abbasids before. The Abbasids managed to suppress Ashinas' rebellion successfully.

=== Foundation of Baghdad ===
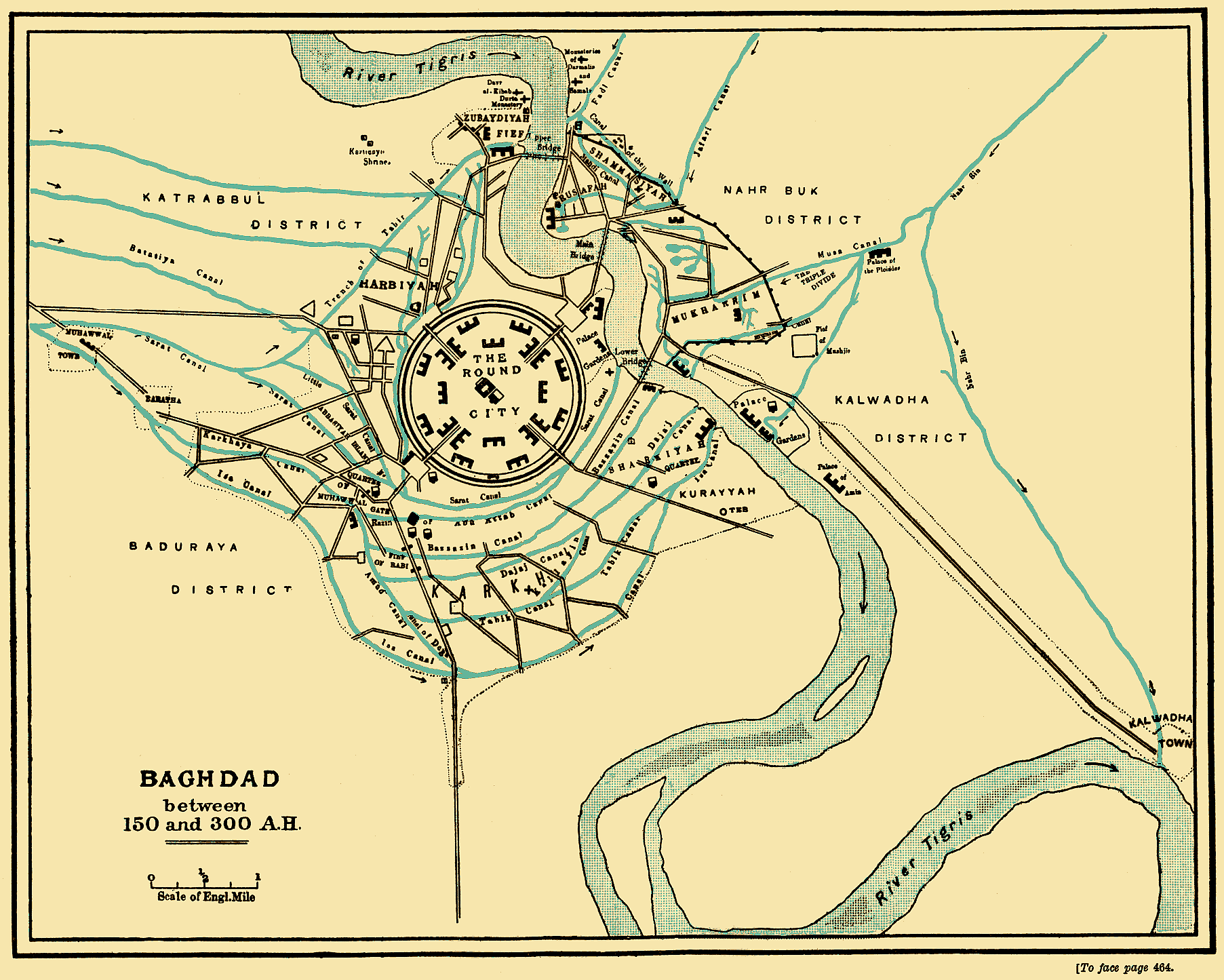
Map of Baghdad between 767 and 912 AD. The city was founded by al-Mansur in 762.

In AD 757, al-Mansur sent a large army to Cappadocia which fortified the city of Malatya. In this same year, he confronted a group of the Rawandiyya from the region of Khorasan that were performing circumambulation around his palace as an act of worship. When in 758/9 the people of Khorasan rioted against al-Mansur in Al-Hashimiyya, Ma'n ibn Za'ida al-Shaybani, a general from the Shayban tribe and companion of Yazid ibn Umar al-Fazari, the Umayyad governor of Iraq, appeared at the scene of the uprising completely masked, and threw himself between the crowd and Mansur, driving the insurgents away. Ma'n reveals himself to al-Mansur as "he whom you have been searching" and upon hearing this, al-Mansur granted him rewards, robes of honour, rank, and amnesty from previously serving the Umayyad dynasty. In 762 two descendants of Hasan ibn Ali rebelled in Medina and Basra. Al-Mansur's troops defeated the rebels first in Medina and then in Basra. This would be the last major uprising against the caliph al-Mansur.

To consolidate his power al-Mansur founded the new imperial residence and palace city Madinat as-Salam (the city of peace), which became the core of the Imperial capital Baghdad. Al-Mansur laid the foundations of Baghdad near the old capital of al-Mada'in, on the western bank of the Tigris River, a location acceptable to him and his commanders. The circular city of about 2.4 km diameter was enclosed by a double-thick defensive wall with four gates named Kufa, Syria, Khorasan, and Basra. In the center of the city al-Mansur erected the caliph's palace and the main mosque. Al-Mansur had built Baghdad in response to a growing concern from the chief towns in Iraq, Basra, and Kufa that there was lack of solidity within the regime after the death of Abu'l 'Abbas (later known as al-Saffah). Another reason for the construction of the new capital was the growing need to house and provide stability for a rapidly developing Abbasid bureaucracy forged under the influence of Iranian ideals. The medieval historians al-Tabari and al-Khatib al-Baghdadi would later claim that al-Mansur had ordered the demolition of the Khosrow palace in Ctesiphon so that the material could be used for the construction of the city of peace.

Al-Mansur pursued his vision of a powerful centralized caliphate in the new Muslim imperial capital of Baghdad. The city was populated with men and women of different faiths and cultures from all over the Islamic world. The Baghdad populace included Christian, Zoroastrian and Jewish minorities and communicated in Arabic. Al-Mansur pursued Islamization by staffing his administration with Muslims of varied backgrounds. Baghdad became one of al-Mansur's lasting achievements. His rule was largely peaceful as he focused on internal reforms, agriculture and patronage of the sciences, thus he paved the way for Baghdad to become a global center of learning and science under the rule of the seventh Abbasid caliph al-Ma'mun.

=== Designation of his son as Heir and Secret service under him ===
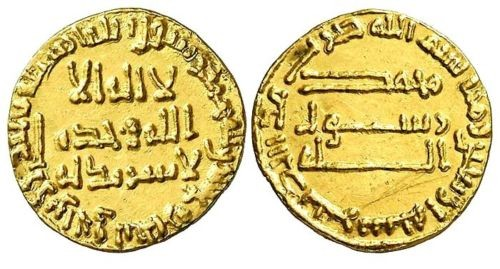
Gold dinar of al-Mansur

In 764 al-Mansur's son al-Mahdi was made the designated heir to the caliphate, taking precedence over al-Mansur's nephew Isa ibn Musa, who had been named the designated successor when al-Mansur was crowned caliph. This change in succession was opposed by parts of the Abbasid family and some allies of Isa ibn Musa in Khorasan, but was supported by the Abbasid army. Al-Mansur had cultivated support for his son's accession since 754, while undermining Isa ibn Musa's position within the Abbasid military.

Al-Tabari writes in his History of Prophets and Kings: "Abu Ja'far had a mirror in which he could descry his enemy from his friend." Al-Mansur's secret service extended to remote regions of his empire, and were cognizant of everything from social unrest to the price of figs, making Mansur very knowledgeable of his domains. He rose at dawn, worked until evening prayer. He set the example for his son and heir. According to historic sources al-Mansur advised his son: "put not off the work of today until tomorrow and attend in person to the affairs of state. Sleep not, for thy father has not slept since he came to the caliphate. For when sleep fell upon his eyes, his spirit remained awake." Notably frugal, al-Mansur was nicknamed Abu al-Duwaneek ("the Father of Small Change"), kept close tabs on his tax collectors, and made sure public spending was carefully monitored. He is reported as having said "he who has no money has no men, and he who has no men watches as his enemies grow great."

== Religious policy ==
The Alids, descendants of Muhammad through his cousin and son-in-law Ali ibn Abi Talib, had allied with the Abbasids against the Umayyads, anticipating that power would be transferred to the prominent Alid scholar Ja'far al-Sadiq, a great-grandson of Ali and one of the most influential scholars in Islamic jurisprudence at the time. When it became clear that the Abbasid family had no intention of relinquishing power to an Alid, these factions shifted into active opposition. When al-Mansur came to power as second Abbasid caliph he started to suppress what he perceived as extreme elements in the broad Muslim coalition that had supported the Abbasid Revolution. He would be the first Abbasid caliph to uphold Islamic orthodoxy as a matter of public policy. While al-Mansur's regime did not intrude into the private realm of elites, orthodoxy was promoted in public worship, for example through the organization of pilgrim caravans. Al-Mansur's harsh treatment towards the Alids led to a revolt in 762–763, but they were eventually defeated.

Ja'far al-Sadiq became the victim of surveillance by the Abbasid family and in response to his growing popularity among the people was eventually allegedly poisoned on the orders of the caliph in the tenth year of al-Mansur's reign. According to a number of sources, Abu Hanifa, who founded a school of jurisprudence, was imprisoned by al-Mansur. Malik ibn Anas, the founder of another school, was flogged during his rule, but al-Mansur himself did not condone this. Al-Mansur's cousin, the governor of Medina at the time, had ordered the flogging and was punished for doing so. Muhammad and Ibrahim ibn Abdallah, the grandsons of Hasan ibn Ali, grandson of Muhammad, were persecuted by al-Mansur after rebelling against his reign. They escaped his persecution, but al-Mansur's anger fell upon their father Abd Allah al-Mahd and others of his family. Abdallah's sons were later defeated and killed.

== Patronage for translations and scholarship ==
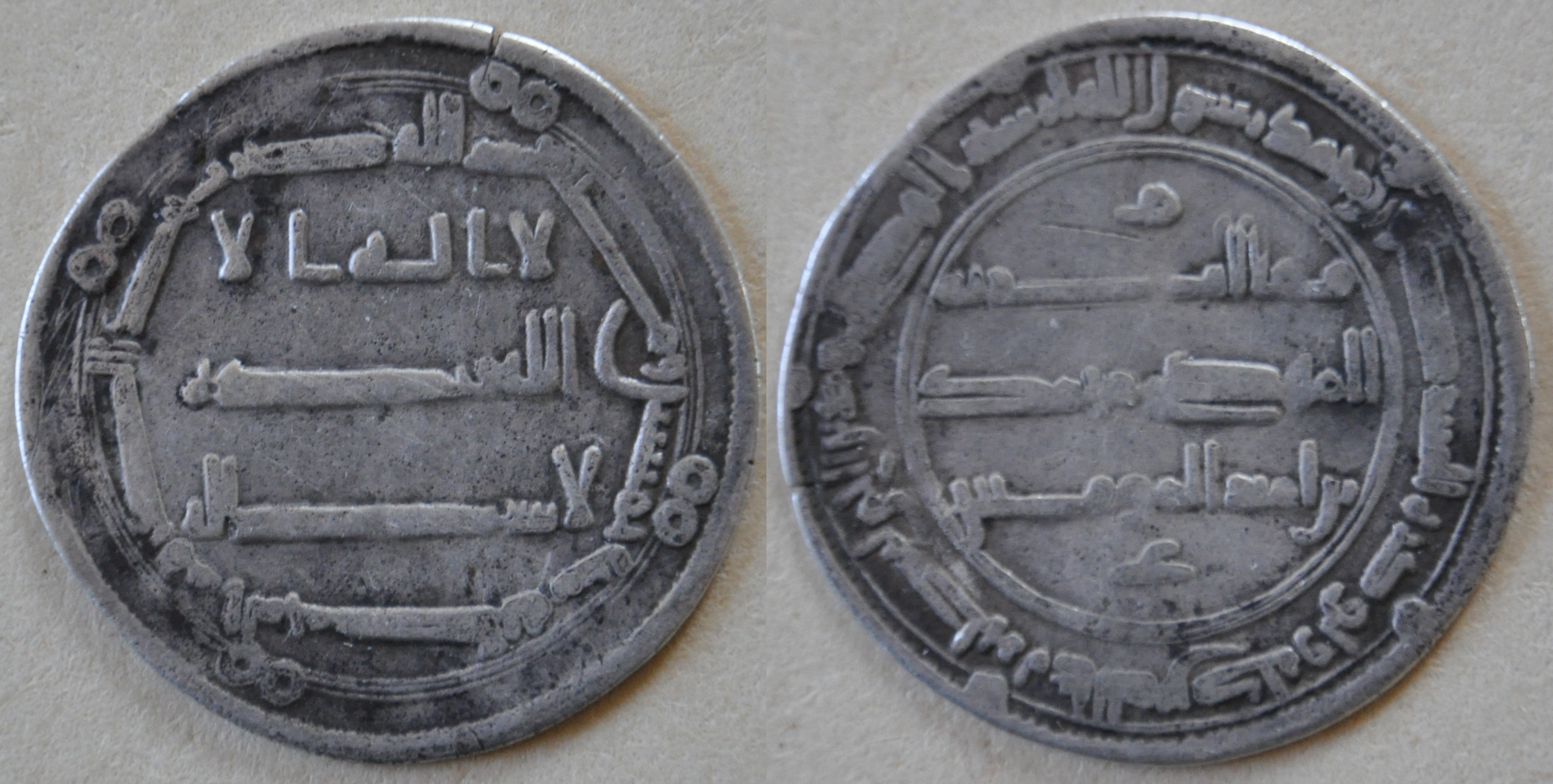
Abbasid Silver Dirham of Caliph al-Mansur 754–775

Al-Mansur was the first Abbasid caliph to sponsor the Translation Movement. Al-Mansur was particularly interested in sponsoring the translations of texts on astronomy and astrology. Al-Mansur called scientists to his court and became noted as patron of astronomers. When al-Mansur's Baghdad court was presented with the Zij al-Sindhind, an Indian astronomical handbook that included tables to calculate celestial positions, al-Mansur ordered for this major Indian work on astronomy to be translated from Sanskrit to Arabic. The astronomical tables in the Arabic translation of Zij al-Sindhind became widely adopted by Muslim scholars. During al-Mansur reign Greek works were also translated, such Ptolemy's Almagest and Euclid's Elements.

Al-Mansur had Persian books on astronomy, mathematics, medicine, philosophy and other sciences translated in a systematic campaign to collect knowledge. The translation of Persian books was part of a growing interest in ancient Iranian heritage and a Persian revivalist movement which al-Mansur sponsored. The translation and study of works in Pahlavi, a pre-Islamic language of Persia, became fashionable among intellectuals and authors who supported the Abbasid caliphate. Government secretaries of Persian descent in al-Mansur's administration sponsored translations of Pahlavi texts on the history and principles of royal administration. Popular Arabic translations were produced by Ibn al-Muqaffa of texts that documented the systems and hierarchies of the Sasanian Empire.

Al-Mansur was greatly interested in the quality of the translation and paid al-Ḥajjāj ibn Yūsuf ibn Maṭar to translate Euclid's Elements twice. Al-Mansur paid for the physician Jabril ibn Bukhtishu to write Arabic translations of medical books, while the first Arabic translations of medical texts written by Galen and Hippocrates were done by al-Mansur's official translator. In 765 al-Mansur suffered from a stomach ailment and called the Christian Syriac-speaking physician Jurjis ibn Bukhtishu from Gundeshapur to Baghdad for medical treatment. In doing so al-Mansur started the tradition among Abbasid caliphs, who would pay physicians of the Nestorian Christian Bukhtishu family to attend to their needs and to write original Arabic medical treatises, as well as translate medical texts into Arabic.

== Foreign policy ==
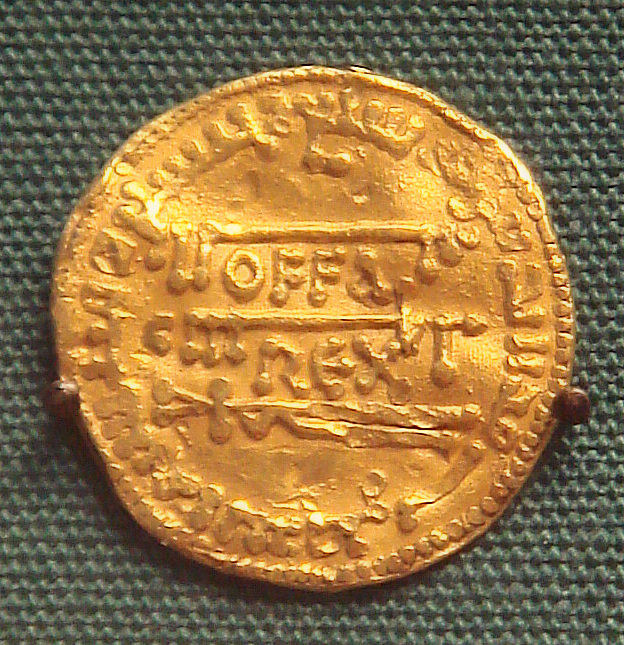
A mancus issued under the Saxon king Offa of Mercia (757–796), copied from a gold dinar of al-Mansur's reign. It combines the Latin legend OFFA REX with Arabic legends. The date of A.H. 157 (773–774) is readable. British Museum.

In 751 the first Abbasid caliph al-Saffah had defeated the Chinese Tang dynasty in the Battle of Talas. Chinese sources record that al-Mansur sent his diplomatic delegations regularly to China. Al-Mansur's delegations were known in China as Heiyi Dashi (Black Clothed Arabs). In 756 al-Mansur sent 3,000 mercenaries to assist Emperor Suzong of Tang in the An Lushan rebellion. A massacre of foreign Arab and Persian Muslim merchants by former Yan rebel general Tian Shengong happened during the An Lushan rebellion in the Yangzhou massacre (760),

The Byzantine emperor Constantine V had used the weakness of the Umayyad caliphate to regain land from Muslim rulers. After the Umayyad caliphate was defeated by al-Mansur's predecessor al-Saffah, Constantine V invaded Armenia and occupied parts of it throughout 751 and 752. Under al-Mansur's rule Muslim armies conducted raids on Byzantine territory. Al-Mansur was the first Abbasid caliph to hold a ransom meeting with the Byzantine Empire. Diplomats in the service of Constantine V and al-Mansur first negotiated the exchange of prisoners in 756.

In 763, al-Mansur sent an expeditionary force to wrest al-Andalus from Umayyad control. However, Abd al-Rahman I successfully defended his territory. Having failed to re-establish authority in the far west, al-Mansur withdrew and thereafter focused his efforts on consolidating the eastern parts of his empire.

Some historians credit al-Mansur with starting the Abbasid–Carolingian alliance. In fact, it was the first Carolingian king Pippin III who initiated a new era of Franconian diplomacy by sending diplomatic envoys to al-Mansur's Baghdad court in 765. It is probable that Pippin III sought an alliance with al-Mansur against their common enemies, the Emirate of Córdoba. In 768 the envoys of Pippin III returned to Francia along with caliph al-Mansur's ambassadors. Pippin III received al-Mansur's delegation in Aquitaine and gifts were exchanged as a sign of the new alliance. This alliance was solidified when between 797 and 807 emperor Charlemagne and caliph Harun al-Rashid established embassies.

== Family ==
Al-Mansur's first wife was Arwa known as Umm Musa, whose lineage went back to the kings of Himyar. Her father was Mansur al-Himyari. She had a brother named Yazid. She had two sons, Muhammad (future Caliph al-Mahdi) and Ja'far. She died in 764. Another wife was Hammadah. Her father was Isa, one of al-Mansur's uncles. She died during al-Mansur's reign. Another wife was Fatimah. Her father was Muhammad, one of the descendants of Talha ibn Ubayd Allah. She had three sons, Sulayman, Isa, and Ya'qub. One of his concubines was a Kurdish woman. She was the mother of al-Mansur's son Ja'far 'Ibn al-Kurdiyyah' (Nasab translating to "Son of the Kurdish woman"). Unlike his other adult half-brothers, little is known of Ja'far and he likely was not involved in politics or had marriage or issue. However, his death is recorded at 802 AD by palace records suggesting he lived into adulthood and continued to live at court rather than having been banished or dying before adulthood. Another concubine was Qali-al Farrashah. She was a Greek, and was the mother of al-Mansur's son Salih al-Miskin. Another concubine was Umm al-Qasim, whose son al-Qasim died at aged ten. Al-Masnur's only daughter Aliyah was born to an Umayyad woman (Aliyah al-Umayya bint Abd al-Rahman ibn Abdallah ibn Khalid ibn Asid. She married Ishaq ibn Sulayman and had two sons.

== Death ==
Al-Mas'udi writes that al-Mansur died on Saturday 6, Dhu al-Hijja 158 AH/775 AD. There are varying accounts of the location and circumstances of al-Mansur's death. One account narrates that al-Mansur was on a pilgrimage to Mecca and had nearly reached it when death overtook him at a location called the Garden of the Bani Amir on the high road to Iraq at the age of 63. According to this narration, he was buried in Mecca with his face uncovered because he was wearing the ihram clothing. A hundred graves were dug around Mecca to thwart any attempt to find and violate his bones.

A different narration from Fadl ibn Rabi'a, who claimed to have been with al-Mansur at his time of death, states that he died at al-Batha' near the Well of Maimun, in which he would have been buried at al-Hajun at 65 years of age. In this version, al-Mansur was sitting in a domed room hallucinating about ill omens written on the wall. When al-Rabia replied, "I see nothing written on the wall. Its surface is clean and white," al-Mansur said, "My soul is warned that she may prepare for her near departure." After reaching the Well of Maimun, he reportedly said "God be praised" and succumbed that very day.

When al-Mansur died, the caliphate's treasury contained 600,000,000 dirhams and fourteen million dinars. On his deathbed, Mansur said, "We have sacrificed the life to come for a mere dream!"

== See also ==
- al-Rumiya, city used temporarily by al-Mansur as his seat
- Bay'ah Mosque is a mosque outside Mecca in Arabia, It was built on the orders of al-Mansur.
- Hasan ibn Zayd ibn Hasan Abbasid Governor of Medina 766 to 772.
- Ibn Ishaq
- Sino-Arab relations

== Notes ==
al-Mansur Banu Hashim Clan of the Quraysh Born: c. 714 CE Died: c. 775 CE
Shia Islam titles
Preceded by al-Saffah	Imam of the Hashimiyya; 10 June 754 – 6 October 775	Succeeded by al-Mahdi
Preceded by al-Saffah	Caliph of the Abbasid Caliphate; 10 June 754 – 6 October 775	Succeeded by al-Mahdi
