= Journal of Abbasid Studies =

Academic journal

- Discipline: Islamic studies
- Language: English
- Edited by: Monique Bernards

Publication details
- History: 2014–present
- Publisher: Brill Publishers
- Frequency: Biannual

Standard abbreviations
- ISO 4: J. Abbasid Stud.

Indexing
- ISSN: 2214-2371

Links
- Journal homepage

The Journal of Abbasid Studies (JAS) is a double-blind peer-reviewed journal that publishes original research and review articles on the political, cultural, social, economic, religious and intellectual life of the Abbasid Caliphate.
