= Abd al-Samad ibn Ali =

8th-century Abbasid governor of Jazira

Abd al-Samad ibn Ali عبد الصمد بن علي

Governor of Jazira
- In office 780–780s
- Monarch: al-Mahdi
- Preceded by: Al-Fadl ibn Salih

Governor of Medina and Mecca
- In office 772–776
- Monarch: al-Mansur
- Preceded by: Hasan ibn Zayd
- Succeeded by: Muhammad ibn Abdallah al-Kathiri

Personal details
- Born: Humayma, Bilad al-Sham
- Died: c. 780s Abbasid Caliphate
- Parent: Ali ibn Abdallah (father)
- Military career
- Allegiance: Abbasid Caliphate
- Service years: 750s – 770s

Abd al-Samad ibn Ali al-Hashimi (Arabic: عبد الصمد بن علي الهاشمي) was an eighth century Abbasid personage. He served as the governor of al-Jazira for the Abbasid Caliphate.

Abd al-Samad was the son of Ali ibn Abd Allah ibn al-Abbas. He was a paternal uncle of the first two Abbasid caliphs al-Saffah (r. 750–754) and al-Mansur (r. 754–775), making him one of the "uncles" ('umumah) that held a high degree of influence during the early years following the Abbasid Revolution.

His nephew, al-Mansur appointed him governor of Medina and Mecca in 772. He was dismissed from the office in 776.

In 775, Al-Fadl ibn Salih was appointed governor of the region of al-Jazira north of Damascus by the Abbasid caliph al-Mahdi. He moved to al-Jazira the same year. Al-Fadl returned to Damascus following his trip to Jerusalem in 780 where he accompanied al-Mahdi as part of his entourage. It was around this time when he was deposed as governor of al-Jazira and replaced by Abd al-Samad ibn Ali.

The genealogy of the Abbasids including their rival Zaydi imams

Abbasids

Caliphs of the Abbasid Caliphate
Caliphs of Cairo
Zaydi imams

ʿAbd al-Muṭṭalib ibn ʿHāshīm
ʾAbū Ṭālib ibn ʿAbd al-Muṭṭalib	Abū'l-Fādl al-ʿAbbās ibn ʿAbd al-Muṭṭalib	ʿAbd Allāh ibn ʿAbd al-Muṭṭalib
ʿAlīyyū'l-Murtaḍžā^{(1st Imām of Kaysāniyyā, Zaydīyyā, Imāmiyyā)}	Hibr al-Ummah ʿAbd Allāh ibn al-ʿAbbās	Khātam al-Nabiyyin; Abū'l-Qāsīm; Muḥammad ibn ʿAbd Allāh
Al-Ḥasan al-Mujtabā^{(2nd Imām of Kaysāniyyā, Zaydīyyā, Imāmiyyā)}	Hussayn ibn Ali^{(3rd Imām of Kaysāniyyā, Zaydīyyā, Imāmiyyā)}	Abū'l-Qāsīm Muḥammad al-Hānafīyya^{(4th Imām of Kaysāniyyā)}	ʿAlī ibn ʿAbd Allāh al-Sajjad
Al-Ḥasan al-Mu'thannā^{(5th Imām of Zaydiyyā)}	Ali al-Sajjad (Zayn al-ʿĀbidīn)^{(4th Imām of Zaydiyyā, Imāmiyyā)}	Abū Hāshīm ʿAbd Allāh ibn Muḥammad^{(5th Imām of Hāsheemīyyā)}	Muḥammad "al-Imām"^{(6th Imām of Hāsheemīyyā)} 716/7 - 743	^{(The Governors)}: ʿAbd Allāh ibn ʿAlī ^{(Bilad al-Sham of Syria; 750–754)}; Abd al-Sāmad ^{(Medina and Mecca; 772–776 & Jazira; 780)}	Ṣāliḥ ibn ʿAlī^{(Governor of Egypt)} 750–751
ʿAbd Allāh al-Kāmīl ibn al-Ḥasan al-Mu'thannā	Zayd ibn Ali^{(6th Imām of Zaydiyyā)}	Ibrāhim (Ebrāheem) "al-Imām"^{(7th Imām of Hāsheemīyyā)} 743 - 749	Abū Jāʿfar ʿAbd Allāh al-Mānṣūr^{(2)} r. 754–775	Abū'l-ʿAbbās ʿAbd Allāh as-Saffāh^{(1)} r. 750–754	Mūsā ibn Muḥammad "al-Imām"
Nafsū'zZakiyya^{(First elected caliph by Ibrāhim, Mānṣūr, Saffāh, Imām Mālīk & Abū Ḥanīfa)}^{(8th Imām of Zaydiyyā)}	Yahya ibn Zayd^{(7th Imām of Zaydiyyā)}	Abū Muslīm al-Khurāsānī^{(Governor of Khurasan)} 748–755	Muḥammad al-Mahdī^{(3)} r. 775–785	Jāʿfar^{(Wali al-Ahd & Governor of Mosul)} 762–764	ʿĪsā ibn Mūsā^{(Governor of Kufa)} 750–765
ʿAbd Allāh; Shāh Ghāzī (ʿAbd Allāh ibn Muḥammad)^{(10th Imām of Zaydiyyā)}	Ibrāhīm ibn ʿAbd Allāh al-Kāmīl ibn al-Ḥasan al-Mu'thannā^{ibn Ḥasan al-Mujtabā}^{(9th Imām of Zaydiyyā)}	Al-Ḥusayn ibn ʿAlī al-ʿĀbid ibn al-Ḥasan al-Mu'thallath^{ibn Ḥasan al-Mu'thannā}^{(12th Imām of Zaydiyyā)}	Hārūn ar-Rāshīd^{(5)} r. 786–809	ʿMūsā al-Hādī^{(4)} r. 785–786	^{(The Governors)}: Mūsā ^{(Kufa, Egypt & Medina)}; Ismā'īl ^{(Egypt)}; Dā'wūd^{(Medina)}
Sulaymān^{ibn ʿAbd Allāh al-Kāmīl ibn al-Ḥasan II}^{(Emir of Tlemcen)}^{(Sulaymanid dynasty of Western Algeria)}	Yaḥyā^{ibn ʿAbd Allāh al-Kāmīl ibn al-Ḥasan al-Mu'thannā}^{(14th Imām of Zaydiyyā)}	Ibrāhīm Ṭabāṭabā^{ibn Ismāʿīl al-Dībādj ibn Ibrāhīm al-Ghamr ibn al-Ḥasan al-Mu'thannā}	Muḥammad al-Mu'tasim^{(8)} r. 833–842	Abd Allāh al-Ma'mun^{(7)} r. 813–833	Muḥammad al-Amin^{(6)} r. 809–813
Sūlaymān^{ibn ʿAbd Allāh as-Sālih ibn Mūsā al-Jawn ibn ʿAbd Allāh al-Kāmīl ibn al-Ḥasan al-Mu'thannā}	Idrīs the Elder ibn ʿAbd Allāh^{(Idrisid dynasty of Morocco)}^{(15th Imām of Zaydiyyā)}	Muḥammad ibn IbrāhīmṬabāṭabā^{(16th Imām of Zaydiyyā)}	Jāʿfar al-Mutawakkil^{(10)} r. 847–861	Muḥammad ibn Muḥammad al-Mu'tasim	Hārūn al-Wathiq^{(9)} r. 842–847
Mūsā II^{ibn ʿAbd Allāh as-Sâlih ibn Mūsā al-Jawn ibn ʿAbd Allāh al-Kāmīl}	Idrīs ibn Idrīs^{(2nd Zaydī Imām of Idrisids in Morocco)}	Muḥammad al-Muntasir^{(11)} r. 861–862	Ṭalḥa al-Muwaffaq^{(Regent)} 870–891	Aḥmad al-Musta'in^{(12)} r. 862–866	Muḥammad al-Muhtadi^{(14)} r. 869–870
Ismāʿīl ibn Yūsūf; Al-Ukhayḍhir^{ibn Ibrāhīm ibn Mūsā al-Jawn ibn ʿAbd Allāh al-Kāmīl ibn Ḥasan al-Mu'thannā}	Al-Qāsīm ar-Rassī ibn IbrāhīmṬabāṭabā^{(19th Imām of Zaydiyyā)}	Ibrahim al-Mu'ayyad^{(Wali al-Ahd & Governor of Syria)} 850–861	Aḥmad al-Mu'tadid^{(16)} r. 892–902	Muḥammad al-Mu'tazz^{(13)} r. 866–869	Aḥmad al-Mu'tamid^{(15)} r. 870–892
Muḥammad ibn Yūsūf; Al-Ukhayḍhir^{(1st Zaydī Imām of Ukhaydhirites in Najd and Al-Yamama)}	^{Abūʾl-Ḥusayn; Al-Hādī ilāʾl-Ḥaqq} Yaḥyā ibn al-Ḥusayn^{(1st Zaydī Imām of Rassids in Yemen)}	ʿAlī al-Muktafī^{(17)} r. 902–908	Jāʿfar al-Muqtadir^{(18)} r. 908–929, 929–932	Muḥammad al-Qāhir^{(19)} r. 929, 932–934	Jāʿfar al-Mufawwid^{(Wali al-Ahd)} 875–892
Zayd ibn al-Ḥasan al-Mujtabā ibn ʿAlī ibn Abī Ṭālib	ʿAbd Allāh al-Mustakfī^{(22)} r. 944–946	Al-Faḍl al-Mutīʿ^{(23)} r. 946–974	Ishāq ibn Jāʿfar al-Muqtadir	Muḥammad al-Rādī^{(20)} r. 934–940	Ībrāhīm al-Muttaqī^{(21)} r. 940–944
Ḥasan ibn Zayd ibn al-Ḥasan al-Mujtabā ibn ʿAlīyyū'l-Murtaḍžā	ʿUmar al-Ashraf ibn ʿAlī Zayn al-ʿĀbidīn ibn al-Ḥusayn	ʿAbd al-Karīm al-Ṭāʾiʿ^{(24)} r. 974–991	Aḥmad al-Qāʿdīr^{(25)} r. 991–1031
Ismāʿīl ibn Ḥasan ibn Zayd ibn al-Ḥasan al-Mujtabā	ʿAlī ibn ʿUmar al-Ashraf ibn ʿAlī Zayn al-ʿĀbidīn	Al-Ḥusayn Dhu'l-Dam'a ibn Zayd ibn ʿAlī Zayn al-ʿĀbidīn	ʿAbd Allāh al-Qāʿīm^{(26)} r. 1031–1075
Muḥammad ibn Ismāʿīl ibn Ḥasan ibn Zayd	Al-Ḥasan ibn ʿAlī ibn ʿUmar al-Ashraf	Yaḥyā ibn al-Ḥusayn Dhu'l-Dam'a ibn Zayd	Muḥammad Dhakīrat ad-Dīn^{(Wali al-Ahd)} 1039–1056
Zayd ibn Muḥammad ibn Ismāʿīl ibn Ḥasan	ʿAlī ibn al-Ḥasan ibn ʿAlī ibn ʿUmar al-Ashraf	ʿUmar ibn Yaḥyā ibn al-Ḥusayn Dhu'l-Dam'a	ʿAbd Allāh al-Mūqtādī^{(27)} r. 1075–1094
^{Al-Dāʿī al-Kabīr} Hasan ibn Zayd^{(1st Zaydī Imām of Zaydīds in Tabaristan)}	^{Al-Dāʿī al-Ṣaghīr} Muhammad ibn Zayd^{(2nd Zaydī Imām of Zaydīds in Tabaristan)}	Yaḥyā ibn ʿUmar^{(20th Imām of Zaydiyyā in Samarra)}	Aḥmad al-Mūstāzhīr^{(28)} r. 1094–1118
^{Al-Nāṣir liʾl-Ḥāqq} Hasan al-Utrush^{(3rd Zaydī Imām of Zaydīds in Tabaristan)}	Al-Faḍl al-Mūstārshīd^{(29)} r. 1118–1135
Al-Mānṣūr al-Rāshīd^{(30)} r. 1135–1136
Muḥammad al-Mūqtāfī^{(31)} r. 1136–1160	Alī ibn al-Faḍl al-Qabī
Yūsuf al-Mūstānjīd^{(32)} r. 1160–1170	al-Hāsān ibn Alī
Al-Hāssān al-Mūstādī'^{(33)} r. 1170–1180	Abū Bakr ibn al-Hāsān
Aḥmad al-Nāsīr^{(34)} r. 1180–1225	Abi 'Alī al-Hāsān ibn Abū Bakr
Muḥammad az-Zāhīr^{(35)} r. 1225–1226	Malīka'zZāhīr Rūkn ad-Dīn Baybars^{(Mamluk Sultanate Sultan of Egypt)} r. 1260–1277
Al-Mānsūr al-Mūstānsīr^{(36)} r. 1226–1242	Abū'l-Qāsim Aḥmad al-Mūstānsīr^{(1)} r. 1261	Abū'l-ʿAbbās Aḥmad al-Hakim I^{(2)} r. 1262–1302
ʿAbd Allāh al-Mūstā'sīm^{(37)} r. 1242–1258	Abū'r-Rabīʿ Sulaymān al-Mustakfī I^{(3)} r. 1302–1340	Aḥmad ibn Aḥmad al-Ḥākim bi-amr Allāh
Abū'l-ʿAbbās Aḥmad al-Hakim II^{(5)} r. 1341–1352	Abū'l-Fatḥ Abū Bakr al-Mu'tadid I^{(6)} r. 1352–1362	Abū Isḥāq Ibrāhīm al-Wāṯiq I^{(4)} r. 1340–1341
Abū ʿAbd Allāh Muḥammad al-Mutawakkil I^{(7)} r. 1362–1377, 1377–1383, 1389–1406	Abū Yāḥyā Zakariyāʾ al-Musta'sim^{(8)} r. 1377, 1386–1389	Abū Ḥafs ʿUmar al-Wāṯiq II^{(9)} r. 1383–1386
Abū'l-Faḍl al-ʿAbbās al-Musta'īn^{(10)} r. 1406–1414; Sultan of Egypt r. 1412	Abū'l-Fatḥ Dāwud al-Mu'tadīd II^{(11)} r. 1414–1441	Abū'r-Rabīʿ Sulaymān al-Mustakfī II^{(12)} r. 1441–1451	Yaʿqūb ibn Muḥammad al-Mutawakkil ʿalā'Llāh	Abū'l-Baqāʾ Ḥamza al-Qāʾim^{(13)} r. 1451–1455	Abū'l-Maḥāsin Yūsuf al-Mustanjid^{(14)} r. 1455–1479
Abū'l-ʿIzz ʿAbd al-ʿAzīz al-Mutawakkil II^{(15)} r. 1479–1497
Abū'ṣ-Ṣabr Yaʿqūb al-Mustamsik^{(16)} r. 1497–1508, 1516–1517
Muḥammad al-Mutawakkil III^{(17)} r. 1508–1516, 1517

== Sources ==
- Cobb, Paul M. (2001). White banners: contention in ʻAbbāsid Syria, 750-880. SUNY Press. ISBN 0-7914-4880-0.
- Tabari, Abu Ja'far (1990). Hugh N. Kennedy (ed.). Al-Manṣūr and Al-Mahdī. SUNY Press. ISBN 0-7914-0143-X.
- Khalifah ibn Khayyat (1985). al-Umari, Akram Diya' (ed.). Tarikh Khalifah ibn Khayyat (in Arabic) (3rd ed.). Al-Riyadh: Dar Taybah.
- Al-Baladhuri, Ahmad ibn Jabir (1916). The Origins of the Islamic State, Part I. Trans. Philip Khuri Hitti. New York: Columbia University.
- Yarshater, Ehsan, ed. (1985–2007). The History of al-Ṭabarī (40 vols). SUNY Series in Near Eastern Studies. Albany, New York: State University of New York Press. ISBN 978-0-7914-7249-1.
