= Isma'il ibn Isa ibn Musa al-Hashimi =

Abbasid Governor of Egypt

Isma'il ibn Isa ibn Musa al-Hashimi إسماعيل بن عيسى بن موسى الهاشمي

Abbasid Governor of Egypt
- In office 798 – 798 (less than a year)
- Monarch: Harun Al-Rashid
- Preceded by: Isma'il ibn Salih
- Succeeded by: Al-Layth ibn al-Fadl

Personal details
- Relations: Abbasid dynasty
- Parent: Isa ibn Musa (father)
- Relatives: Ali (brother); Musa (brother); Dawud (brother)

Ismaʿīl ibn ʿĪsā ibn Mūsā al-Hāshimī (Arabic: إسماعيل بن عيسى بن موسى الهاشمي) was an Abbasid personage and governor of Egypt.

The son of Isa ibn Musa, he was appointed to Egypt by his second cousin Harun al-Rashid (r. 786–809) in 798. After an administration lasting for a few months, he was dismissed and replaced with al-Layth ibn al-Fadl.

The genealogy of the Abbasids including their rival Zaydi imams

Abbasids

Caliphs of the Abbasid Caliphate
Caliphs of Cairo
Zaydi imams

ʿAbd al-Muṭṭalib
ibn ʿHāshīm

ʾAbū Ṭālib
ibn ʿAbd al-Muṭṭalib

Abū'l-Fādl
al-ʿAbbās ibn
ʿAbd al-Muṭṭalib

ʿAbd Allāh ibn
ʿAbd al-Muṭṭalib

ʿAlīyyū'l-Murtaḍžā
^{(1st Imām of Kaysāniyyā, Zaydīyyā, Imāmiyyā)}

Hibr al-Ummah
ʿAbd Allāh
ibn al-ʿAbbās

Khātam
al-Nabiyyin
Abū'l-Qāsīm
Muḥammad
ibn ʿAbd Allāh

Al-Ḥasan al-Mujtabā
^{(2nd Imām of Kaysāniyyā, Zaydīyyā, Imāmiyyā)}

Hussayn ibn Ali
^{(3rd Imām of Kaysāniyyā, Zaydīyyā, Imāmiyyā)}

Abū'l-Qāsīm Muḥammad
al-Hānafīyya
^{(4th Imām of Kaysāniyyā)}

ʿAlī ibn
ʿAbd Allāh
al-Sajjad

Al-Ḥasan al-Mu'thannā
^{(5th Imām of Zaydiyyā)}

Ali al-Sajjad
(Zayn al-ʿĀbidīn)
^{(4th Imām of Zaydiyyā, Imāmiyyā)}

Abū Hāshīm
ʿAbd Allāh ibn Muḥammad
^{(5th Imām of Hāsheemīyyā)}

Muḥammad
"al-Imām"
^{(6th Imām of Hāsheemīyyā)}
716/7 - 743

ʿAbd Allāh ibn ʿAlī
^{(Governor of Syria)}
750–754

Ṣāliḥ ibn ʿAlī
^{(Governor of Egypt)}
750–751

ʿAbd Allāh al-Kāmīl ibn al-Ḥasan al-Mu'thannā

Zayd ibn Ali
^{(6th Imām of Zaydiyyā)}

Ibrāhim (Ebrāheem)
"al-Imām"
^{(7th Imām of Hāsheemīyyā)}
743 - 749

Abū Jāʿfar
ʿAbd Allāh
al-Mānṣūr
^{(2)}
r. 754–775

Abū'l-ʿAbbās
ʿAbd Allāh
as-Saffāh
^{(1)}
r. 750–754

Mūsā ibn Muḥammad "al-Imām"

Nafsū'zZakiyya
^{(First elected caliph by Ibrāhim, Mānṣūr, Saffāh, Imām Mālīk & Abū Ḥanīfa)}
^{(8th Imām of Zaydiyyā)}

Yahya ibn Zayd
^{(7th Imām of Zaydiyyā)}

Abū Muslīm al-Khurāsānī
^{(Governor of Khurasan)}
748–755

Muḥammad
al-Mahdī
^{(3)}
r. 775–785

Jāʿfar
^{(Wali al-Ahd & Governor of Mosul)}
762–764

ʿĪsā ibn Mūsā
^{(Governor of Kufa)}
750–765

ʿAbd Allāh
Shāh Ghāzī
(ʿAbd Allāh ibn Muḥammad)
^{(10th Imām of Zaydiyyā)}

Ibrāhīm ibn ʿAbd Allāh al-Kāmīl ibn al-Ḥasan al-Mu'thannā
^{ibn Ḥasan al-Mujtabā}
^{(9th Imām of Zaydiyyā)}

Al-Ḥusayn ibn ʿAlī al-ʿĀbid ibn al-Ḥasan al-Mu'thallath
^{ibn Ḥasan al-Mu'thannā}
^{(12th Imām of Zaydiyyā)}

Hārūn
ar-Rāshīd
^{(5)}
r. 786–809

ʿMūsā
al-Hādī
^{(4)}
r. 785–786

^{(The Governors)}
- Mūsā ^{(Kufa, Egypt & Medina)}
- Ismā'īl
  ^{(Egypt)}
- Dā'wūd
^{(Medina)}

Sulaymān
^{ibn ʿAbd Allāh al-Kāmīl ibn al-Ḥasan II}
^{(Emir of Tlemcen)}
^{(Sulaymanid dynasty of Western Algeria)}

Yaḥyā
^{ibn ʿAbd Allāh al-Kāmīl ibn al-Ḥasan al-Mu'thannā}
^{(14th Imām of Zaydiyyā)}

Ibrāhīm Ṭabāṭabā
^{ibn Ismāʿīl al-Dībādj ibn Ibrāhīm al-Ghamr ibn
al-Ḥasan al-Mu'thannā}

Muḥammad
al-Mu'tasim
^{(8)}
r. 833–842

Abd Allāh
al-Ma'mun
^{(7)}
r. 813–833

Muḥammad
al-Amin
^{(6)}
r. 809–813

Sūlaymān
^{ibn ʿAbd Allāh as-Sālih ibn Mūsā al-Jawn ibn ʿAbd Allāh al-Kāmīl ibn al-Ḥasan al-Mu'thannā}

Idrīs the Elder ibn ʿAbd Allāh
^{(Idrisid dynasty of Morocco)}
^{(15th Imām of Zaydiyyā)}

Muḥammad ibn IbrāhīmṬabāṭabā
^{(16th Imām of Zaydiyyā)}

Jāʿfar al-Mutawakkil
^{(10)}
r. 847–861

Muḥammad ibn Muḥammad
al-Mu'tasim

Hārūn
al-Wathiq
^{(9)}
r. 842–847

Mūsā II
^{ibn ʿAbd Allāh as-Sâlih ibn Mūsā al-Jawn ibn ʿAbd Allāh al-Kāmīl}

Idrīs ibn Idrīs
^{(2nd Zaydī Imām of Idrisids in Morocco)}

Muḥammad
al-Muntasir
^{(11)}
r. 861–862

Ṭalḥa al-Muwaffaq
^{(Regent)}
870–891

Aḥmad
al-Musta'in
^{(12)}
r. 862–866

Muḥammad
al-Muhtadi
^{(14)}
r. 869–870

Ismāʿīl ibn Yūsūf
Al-Ukhayḍhir
^{ibn Ibrāhīm ibn Mūsā al-Jawn ibn ʿAbd Allāh al-Kāmīl ibn Ḥasan al-Mu'thannā}

Al-Qāsīm
ar-Rassī ibn IbrāhīmṬabāṭabā
^{(19th Imām of Zaydiyyā)}

Ibrahim al-Mu'ayyad
^{(Wali al-Ahd & Governor of Syria)}
850–861

Aḥmad
al-Mu'tadid
^{(16)}
r. 892–902

Muḥammad
al-Mu'tazz
^{(13)}
r. 866–869

Aḥmad
al-Mu'tamid
^{(15)}
r. 870–892

Muḥammad ibn Yūsūf
Al-Ukhayḍhir
^{(1st Zaydī Imām of Ukhaydhirites in Najd and Al-Yamama)}

^{Abūʾl-Ḥusayn
Al-Hādī ilāʾl-Ḥaqq}
Yaḥyā ibn
al-Ḥusayn
^{(1st Zaydī Imām of Rassids in Yemen)}

ʿAlī
al-Muktafī
^{(17)}
r. 902–908

Jāʿfar
al-Muqtadir
^{(18)}
r. 908–929,
929–932

Muḥammad
al-Qāhir
^{(19)}
r. 929, 932–934

Jāʿfar al-Mufawwid
^{(Wali al-Ahd)}
875–892

Zayd ibn al-Ḥasan al-Mujtabā ibn ʿAlī ibn Abī Ṭālib

ʿAbd Allāh
al-Mustakfī
^{(22)}
r. 944–946

Al-Faḍl
al-Mutīʿ
^{(23)}
r. 946–974

Ishāq ibn Jāʿfar al-Muqtadir

Muḥammad
al-Rādī
^{(20)}
r. 934–940

Ībrāhīm
al-Muttaqī
^{(21)}
r. 940–944

Ḥasan ibn Zayd ibn al-Ḥasan al-Mujtabā ibn ʿAlīyyū'l-Murtaḍžā

ʿUmar al-Ashraf ibn ʿAlī Zayn al-ʿĀbidīn ibn al-Ḥusayn

ʿAbd al-Karīm
al-Ṭāʾiʿ
^{(24)}
r. 974–991

Aḥmad
al-Qāʿdīr
^{(25)}
r. 991–1031

Ismāʿīl ibn Ḥasan ibn Zayd ibn al-Ḥasan al-Mujtabā

ʿAlī ibn ʿUmar al-Ashraf ibn ʿAlī Zayn al-ʿĀbidīn

Al-Ḥusayn Dhu'l-Dam'a ibn Zayd ibn ʿAlī Zayn al-ʿĀbidīn

ʿAbd Allāh
al-Qāʿīm
^{(26)}
r. 1031–1075

Muḥammad ibn Ismāʿīl ibn Ḥasan ibn Zayd

Al-Ḥasan ibn ʿAlī ibn ʿUmar al-Ashraf

Yaḥyā ibn al-Ḥusayn Dhu'l-Dam'a ibn Zayd

Muḥammad Dhakīrat ad-Dīn
^{(Wali al-Ahd)}
1039–1056

Zayd ibn Muḥammad ibn Ismāʿīl ibn Ḥasan

ʿAlī ibn al-Ḥasan ibn ʿAlī ibn ʿUmar al-Ashraf

ʿUmar ibn Yaḥyā ibn al-Ḥusayn Dhu'l-Dam'a

ʿAbd Allāh
al-Mūqtādī
^{(27)}
r. 1075–1094

^{Al-Dāʿī al-Kabīr}
Hasan ibn Zayd
^{(1st Zaydī Imām of Zaydīds in Tabaristan)}

^{Al-Dāʿī al-Ṣaghīr}
Muhammad ibn Zayd
^{(2nd Zaydī Imām of Zaydīds in Tabaristan)}

Yaḥyā ibn ʿUmar
^{(20th Imām of Zaydiyyā in Samarra)}

Aḥmad
al-Mūstāzhīr
^{(28)}
r. 1094–1118

^{Al-Nāṣir liʾl-Ḥāqq}
Hasan al-Utrush
^{(3rd Zaydī Imām of Zaydīds in Tabaristan)}

Al-Faḍl al-Mūstārshīd
^{(29)}
r. 1118–1135

Al-Mānṣūr
al-Rāshīd
^{(30)}
r. 1135–1136

Muḥammad
al-Mūqtāfī
^{(31)}
r. 1136–1160

Alī ibn al-Faḍl
al-Qabī

Yūsuf
al-Mūstānjīd
^{(32)}
r. 1160–1170

al-Hāsān
ibn Alī

Al-Hāssān
al-Mūstādī'
^{(33)}
r. 1170–1180

Abū Bakr
ibn al-Hāsān

Aḥmad
al-Nāsīr
^{(34)}
r. 1180–1225

Abi 'Alī al-Hāsān ibn Abū Bakr

Muḥammad
az-Zāhīr
^{(35)}
r. 1225–1226

Malīka'zZāhīr Rūkn ad-Dīn Baybars
^{(Mamluk Sultanate Sultan of Egypt)}
r. 1260–1277

Al-Mānsūr
al-Mūstānsīr
^{(36)}
r. 1226–1242

Abū'l-Qāsim Aḥmad
al-Mūstānsīr
^{(1)}
r. 1261

Abū'l-ʿAbbās Aḥmad
al-Hakim I
^{(2)}
r. 1262–1302

ʿAbd Allāh
al-Mūstā'sīm
^{(37)}
r. 1242–1258

Abū'r-Rabīʿ Sulaymān
al-Mustakfī I
^{(3)}
r. 1302–1340

Aḥmad ibn Aḥmad
al-Ḥākim bi-amr Allāh

Abū'l-ʿAbbās Aḥmad
al-Hakim II
^{(5)}
r. 1341–1352

Abū'l-Fatḥ Abū Bakr
al-Mu'tadid I
^{(6)}
r. 1352–1362

Abū Isḥāq Ibrāhīm
al-Wāṯiq I
^{(4)}
r. 1340–1341

Abū ʿAbd Allāh Muḥammad
al-Mutawakkil I
^{(7)}
r. 1362–1377,
1377–1383,
1389–1406

Abū Yāḥyā Zakariyāʾ
al-Musta'sim
^{(8)}
r. 1377,
1386–1389

Abū Ḥafs ʿUmar
al-Wāṯiq II
^{(9)}
r. 1383–1386

Abū'l-Faḍl al-ʿAbbās
al-Musta'īn
^{(10)}
r. 1406–1414
Sultan of Egypt
r. 1412

Abū'l-Fatḥ Dāwud
al-Mu'tadīd II
^{(11)}
r. 1414–1441

Abū'r-Rabīʿ Sulaymān
al-Mustakfī II
^{(12)}
r. 1441–1451

Yaʿqūb ibn Muḥammad
al-Mutawakkil ʿalā'Llāh

Abū'l-Baqāʾ Ḥamza
al-Qāʾim
^{(13)}
r. 1451–1455

Abū'l-Maḥāsin Yūsuf
al-Mustanjid
^{(14)}
r. 1455–1479

Abū'l-ʿIzz ʿAbd al-ʿAzīz
al-Mutawakkil II
^{(15)}
r. 1479–1497

Abū'ṣ-Ṣabr Yaʿqūb
al-Mustamsik
^{(16)}
r. 1497–1508,
1516–1517

Muḥammad
al-Mutawakkil III
^{(17)}
r. 1508–1516,
1517

== Notes ==
Preceded by Isma'il ibn Salih ibn Ali al-Hashimi	Governor of Egypt; 798	Succeeded by Al-Layth ibn al-Fadl
