= Ishaq ibn al-Muqtadir =

10th-century Abbasid prince and father of Al-Qadir

Ishaq ibn al-Muqtadir اسحاق بن المُقتدر
- Born: 910s Baghdad
- Died: March 988; Baghdad
- Burial: Baghdad
- Spouse: Tamanni
- Issue: Ahmad al-Qadir; Amina bint Ishaq
Names
- Ishaq ibn Jafar al-Muqtadir ibn Ahmad al-Mu'tadid
- Dynasty: Abbasid
- Father: al-Muqtadir
- Mother: Dimna
- Religion: Sunni Islam

Ishaq ibn al-Muqtadir (Arabic: اسحاق ابن المُقتدر; 910s – March 988) was an Abbasid prince, son of the Abbasid caliph al-Muqtadir. He was a contemporary of the caliphs al-Qahir, al-Radi, al-Muttaqi, al-Mustakfi, al-Muti and al-Ta'i', three of whom were his brothers. As a son of al-Muqtadir, he was also a candidate to the succession to caliphal throne during the reigns of his brothers, but it was his son Ahmad became caliph as al-Qadir in 991.

== Biography ==
Ishaq was the son of Caliph al-Muqtadir (r. 908–932) from the concubine Dimna. Ishaq was born in Baghdad and he spent most of his life there.

Ishaq had a tragic childhood. Al-Muqtadir was assassinated when Ishaq was very young. After his father's death his uncle al-Qahir became caliph even though his father had already nominated his elder half-brother Abu al-Abbas (the future al-Radi). His uncle was supported by some army commanders because they didn't want to be executed for al-Muqtadir's murder by his sons.

Ishaq had inherited some of the inheritance on his father's death. His uncle, al-Qahir, rule from 932 until 934, when he refused to abdicate in favour of al-Radi (r. 934–940), he was blinded and cast into prison. Al-Radi died in 940 and was succeeded by his brother, al-Muttaqi, who in turn was succeeded by his cousin al-Mustakfi in 944. Al-Mustakfi was hostile towards al-Muqtadir's surviving sons, but was deposed by the Buyid ruler Mu'izz al-Dawla in 946 and was succeeded by al-Muti, a son of al-Muqtadir. Ishaq spent his life as a junior courtier in his brother's court.

During al-Muti's reign it was expected that he would be succeeded by one of his brothers (especially Ishaq) however he nominated his son al-Ta'i as heir.

With his wife, called Tamanni, Ishaq had a son, Ahmad, the future al-Qadir. Ahmad received a good education; he is recorded as having collected Shafi'i works on jurisprudence (fiqh) by Ahmad ibn Muhammad al-Harawi. Ishaq also had a daughter named Amina.

== Death and aftermath ==
When Ishaq died in March 988, his son Ahmad quarreled with his half-sister, Amina, over the inheritance. She reported him to their cousin, caliph al-Ta'i (r. 974–991), as seeking to replace him as caliph. To escape capture, Ahmad went into hiding for a while, before seeking refuge with the governor of the swamps of Bathihah near Basra, Muhadhdhib al-Dawla, for about three years.

The genealogy of the Abbasids including their rival Zaydi imams

Abbasids

Caliphs of the Abbasid Caliphate
Caliphs of Cairo
Zaydi imams

ʿAbd al-Muṭṭalib
ibn ʿHāshīm

ʾAbū Ṭālib
ibn ʿAbd al-Muṭṭalib

Abū'l-Fādl
al-ʿAbbās ibn
ʿAbd al-Muṭṭalib

ʿAbd Allāh ibn
ʿAbd al-Muṭṭalib

ʿAlīyyū'l-Murtaḍžā
^{(1st Imām of Kaysāniyyā, Zaydīyyā, Imāmiyyā)}

Hibr al-Ummah
ʿAbd Allāh
ibn al-ʿAbbās

Khātam
al-Nabiyyin
Abū'l-Qāsīm
Muḥammad
ibn ʿAbd Allāh

Al-Ḥasan al-Mujtabā
^{(2nd Imām of Kaysāniyyā, Zaydīyyā, Imāmiyyā)}

Hussayn ibn Ali
^{(3rd Imām of Kaysāniyyā, Zaydīyyā, Imāmiyyā)}

Abū'l-Qāsīm Muḥammad
al-Hānafīyya
^{(4th Imām of Kaysāniyyā)}

ʿAlī ibn
ʿAbd Allāh
al-Sajjad

Al-Ḥasan al-Mu'thannā
^{(5th Imām of Zaydiyyā)}

Ali al-Sajjad
(Zayn al-ʿĀbidīn)
^{(4th Imām of Zaydiyyā, Imāmiyyā)}

Abū Hāshīm
ʿAbd Allāh ibn Muḥammad
^{(5th Imām of Hāsheemīyyā)}

Muḥammad
"al-Imām"
^{(6th Imām of Hāsheemīyyā)}
716/7 - 743

ʿAbd Allāh ibn ʿAlī
^{(Governor of Syria)}
750–754

Ṣāliḥ ibn ʿAlī
^{(Governor of Egypt)}
750–751

ʿAbd Allāh al-Kāmīl ibn al-Ḥasan al-Mu'thannā

Zayd ibn Ali
^{(6th Imām of Zaydiyyā)}

Ibrāhim (Ebrāheem)
"al-Imām"
^{(7th Imām of Hāsheemīyyā)}
743 - 749

Abū Jāʿfar
ʿAbd Allāh
al-Mānṣūr
^{(2)}
r. 754–775

Abū'l-ʿAbbās
ʿAbd Allāh
as-Saffāh
^{(1)}
r. 750–754

Mūsā ibn Muḥammad "al-Imām"

Nafsū'zZakiyya
^{(First elected caliph by Ibrāhim, Mānṣūr, Saffāh, Imām Mālīk & Abū Ḥanīfa)}
^{(8th Imām of Zaydiyyā)}

Yahya ibn Zayd
^{(7th Imām of Zaydiyyā)}

Abū Muslīm al-Khurāsānī
^{(Governor of Khurasan)}
748–755

Muḥammad
al-Mahdī
^{(3)}
r. 775–785

Jāʿfar
^{(Wali al-Ahd & Governor of Mosul)}
762–764

ʿĪsā ibn Mūsā
^{(Governor of Kufa)}
750–765

ʿAbd Allāh
Shāh Ghāzī
(ʿAbd Allāh ibn Muḥammad)
^{(10th Imām of Zaydiyyā)}

Ibrāhīm ibn ʿAbd Allāh al-Kāmīl ibn al-Ḥasan al-Mu'thannā
^{ibn Ḥasan al-Mujtabā}
^{(9th Imām of Zaydiyyā)}

Al-Ḥusayn ibn ʿAlī al-ʿĀbid ibn al-Ḥasan al-Mu'thallath
^{ibn Ḥasan al-Mu'thannā}
^{(12th Imām of Zaydiyyā)}

Hārūn
ar-Rāshīd
^{(5)}
r. 786–809

ʿMūsā
al-Hādī
^{(4)}
r. 785–786

^{(The Governors)}
- Mūsā ^{(Kufa, Egypt & Medina)}
- Ismā'īl
  ^{(Egypt)}
- Dā'wūd
^{(Medina)}

Sulaymān
^{ibn ʿAbd Allāh al-Kāmīl ibn al-Ḥasan II}
^{(Emir of Tlemcen)}
^{(Sulaymanid dynasty of Western Algeria)}

Yaḥyā
^{ibn ʿAbd Allāh al-Kāmīl ibn al-Ḥasan al-Mu'thannā}
^{(14th Imām of Zaydiyyā)}

Ibrāhīm Ṭabāṭabā
^{ibn Ismāʿīl al-Dībādj ibn Ibrāhīm al-Ghamr ibn
al-Ḥasan al-Mu'thannā}

Muḥammad
al-Mu'tasim
^{(8)}
r. 833–842

Abd Allāh
al-Ma'mun
^{(7)}
r. 813–833

Muḥammad
al-Amin
^{(6)}
r. 809–813

Sūlaymān
^{ibn ʿAbd Allāh as-Sālih ibn Mūsā al-Jawn ibn ʿAbd Allāh al-Kāmīl ibn al-Ḥasan al-Mu'thannā}

Idrīs the Elder ibn ʿAbd Allāh
^{(Idrisid dynasty of Morocco)}
^{(15th Imām of Zaydiyyā)}

Muḥammad ibn IbrāhīmṬabāṭabā
^{(16th Imām of Zaydiyyā)}

Jāʿfar al-Mutawakkil
^{(10)}
r. 847–861

Muḥammad ibn Muḥammad
al-Mu'tasim

Hārūn
al-Wathiq
^{(9)}
r. 842–847

Mūsā II
^{ibn ʿAbd Allāh as-Sâlih ibn Mūsā al-Jawn ibn ʿAbd Allāh al-Kāmīl}

Idrīs ibn Idrīs
^{(2nd Zaydī Imām of Idrisids in Morocco)}

Muḥammad
al-Muntasir
^{(11)}
r. 861–862

Ṭalḥa al-Muwaffaq
^{(Regent)}
870–891

Aḥmad
al-Musta'in
^{(12)}
r. 862–866

Muḥammad
al-Muhtadi
^{(14)}
r. 869–870

Ismāʿīl ibn Yūsūf
Al-Ukhayḍhir
^{ibn Ibrāhīm ibn Mūsā al-Jawn ibn ʿAbd Allāh al-Kāmīl ibn Ḥasan al-Mu'thannā}

Al-Qāsīm
ar-Rassī ibn IbrāhīmṬabāṭabā
^{(19th Imām of Zaydiyyā)}

Ibrahim al-Mu'ayyad
^{(Wali al-Ahd & Governor of Syria)}
850–861

Aḥmad
al-Mu'tadid
^{(16)}
r. 892–902

Muḥammad
al-Mu'tazz
^{(13)}
r. 866–869

Aḥmad
al-Mu'tamid
^{(15)}
r. 870–892

Muḥammad ibn Yūsūf
Al-Ukhayḍhir
^{(1st Zaydī Imām of Ukhaydhirites in Najd and Al-Yamama)}

^{Abūʾl-Ḥusayn
Al-Hādī ilāʾl-Ḥaqq}
Yaḥyā ibn
al-Ḥusayn
^{(1st Zaydī Imām of Rassids in Yemen)}

ʿAlī
al-Muktafī
^{(17)}
r. 902–908

Jāʿfar
al-Muqtadir
^{(18)}
r. 908–929,
929–932

Muḥammad
al-Qāhir
^{(19)}
r. 929, 932–934

Jāʿfar al-Mufawwid
^{(Wali al-Ahd)}
875–892

Zayd ibn al-Ḥasan al-Mujtabā ibn ʿAlī ibn Abī Ṭālib

ʿAbd Allāh
al-Mustakfī
^{(22)}
r. 944–946

Al-Faḍl
al-Mutīʿ
^{(23)}
r. 946–974

Ishāq ibn Jāʿfar al-Muqtadir

Muḥammad
al-Rādī
^{(20)}
r. 934–940

Ībrāhīm
al-Muttaqī
^{(21)}
r. 940–944

Ḥasan ibn Zayd ibn al-Ḥasan al-Mujtabā ibn ʿAlīyyū'l-Murtaḍžā

ʿUmar al-Ashraf ibn ʿAlī Zayn al-ʿĀbidīn ibn al-Ḥusayn

ʿAbd al-Karīm
al-Ṭāʾiʿ
^{(24)}
r. 974–991

Aḥmad
al-Qāʿdīr
^{(25)}
r. 991–1031

Ismāʿīl ibn Ḥasan ibn Zayd ibn al-Ḥasan al-Mujtabā

ʿAlī ibn ʿUmar al-Ashraf ibn ʿAlī Zayn al-ʿĀbidīn

Al-Ḥusayn Dhu'l-Dam'a ibn Zayd ibn ʿAlī Zayn al-ʿĀbidīn

ʿAbd Allāh
al-Qāʿīm
^{(26)}
r. 1031–1075

Muḥammad ibn Ismāʿīl ibn Ḥasan ibn Zayd

Al-Ḥasan ibn ʿAlī ibn ʿUmar al-Ashraf

Yaḥyā ibn al-Ḥusayn Dhu'l-Dam'a ibn Zayd

Muḥammad Dhakīrat ad-Dīn
^{(Wali al-Ahd)}
1039–1056

Zayd ibn Muḥammad ibn Ismāʿīl ibn Ḥasan

ʿAlī ibn al-Ḥasan ibn ʿAlī ibn ʿUmar al-Ashraf

ʿUmar ibn Yaḥyā ibn al-Ḥusayn Dhu'l-Dam'a

ʿAbd Allāh
al-Mūqtādī
^{(27)}
r. 1075–1094

^{Al-Dāʿī al-Kabīr}
Hasan ibn Zayd
^{(1st Zaydī Imām of Zaydīds in Tabaristan)}

^{Al-Dāʿī al-Ṣaghīr}
Muhammad ibn Zayd
^{(2nd Zaydī Imām of Zaydīds in Tabaristan)}

Yaḥyā ibn ʿUmar
^{(20th Imām of Zaydiyyā in Samarra)}

Aḥmad
al-Mūstāzhīr
^{(28)}
r. 1094–1118

^{Al-Nāṣir liʾl-Ḥāqq}
Hasan al-Utrush
^{(3rd Zaydī Imām of Zaydīds in Tabaristan)}

Al-Faḍl al-Mūstārshīd
^{(29)}
r. 1118–1135

Al-Mānṣūr
al-Rāshīd
^{(30)}
r. 1135–1136

Muḥammad
al-Mūqtāfī
^{(31)}
r. 1136–1160

Alī ibn al-Faḍl
al-Qabī

Yūsuf
al-Mūstānjīd
^{(32)}
r. 1160–1170

al-Hāsān
ibn Alī

Al-Hāssān
al-Mūstādī'
^{(33)}
r. 1170–1180

Abū Bakr
ibn al-Hāsān

Aḥmad
al-Nāsīr
^{(34)}
r. 1180–1225

Abi 'Alī al-Hāsān ibn Abū Bakr

Muḥammad
az-Zāhīr
^{(35)}
r. 1225–1226

Malīka'zZāhīr Rūkn ad-Dīn Baybars
^{(Mamluk Sultanate Sultan of Egypt)}
r. 1260–1277

Al-Mānsūr
al-Mūstānsīr
^{(36)}
r. 1226–1242

Abū'l-Qāsim Aḥmad
al-Mūstānsīr
^{(1)}
r. 1261

Abū'l-ʿAbbās Aḥmad
al-Hakim I
^{(2)}
r. 1262–1302

ʿAbd Allāh
al-Mūstā'sīm
^{(37)}
r. 1242–1258

Abū'r-Rabīʿ Sulaymān
al-Mustakfī I
^{(3)}
r. 1302–1340

Aḥmad ibn Aḥmad
al-Ḥākim bi-amr Allāh

Abū'l-ʿAbbās Aḥmad
al-Hakim II
^{(5)}
r. 1341–1352

Abū'l-Fatḥ Abū Bakr
al-Mu'tadid I
^{(6)}
r. 1352–1362

Abū Isḥāq Ibrāhīm
al-Wāṯiq I
^{(4)}
r. 1340–1341

Abū ʿAbd Allāh Muḥammad
al-Mutawakkil I
^{(7)}
r. 1362–1377,
1377–1383,
1389–1406

Abū Yāḥyā Zakariyāʾ
al-Musta'sim
^{(8)}
r. 1377,
1386–1389

Abū Ḥafs ʿUmar
al-Wāṯiq II
^{(9)}
r. 1383–1386

Abū'l-Faḍl al-ʿAbbās
al-Musta'īn
^{(10)}
r. 1406–1414
Sultan of Egypt
r. 1412

Abū'l-Fatḥ Dāwud
al-Mu'tadīd II
^{(11)}
r. 1414–1441

Abū'r-Rabīʿ Sulaymān
al-Mustakfī II
^{(12)}
r. 1441–1451

Yaʿqūb ibn Muḥammad
al-Mutawakkil ʿalā'Llāh

Abū'l-Baqāʾ Ḥamza
al-Qāʾim
^{(13)}
r. 1451–1455

Abū'l-Maḥāsin Yūsuf
al-Mustanjid
^{(14)}
r. 1455–1479

Abū'l-ʿIzz ʿAbd al-ʿAzīz
al-Mutawakkil II
^{(15)}
r. 1479–1497

Abū'ṣ-Ṣabr Yaʿqūb
al-Mustamsik
^{(16)}
r. 1497–1508,
1516–1517

Muḥammad
al-Mutawakkil III
^{(17)}
r. 1508–1516,
1517

== Sources ==
- Busse, Heribert (2004) [1969]. Chalif und Grosskönig - Die Buyiden im Irak (945-1055) [Caliph and Great King - The Buyids in Iraq (945-1055)] (in German). Würzburg: Ergon Verlag. ISBN 3-89913-005-7.
- Küçükaşcı, Mustafa Sabri (2001). "Kādir-Billâh". TDV Encyclopedia of Islam, Vol. 24 (Kāânî-i Şîrâzî – Kastamonu) (in Turkish). Istanbul: Presidency of Religious Affairs, Centre for Islamic Studies. pp. 127–128. ISBN 978-975-389-451-7.
- Massignon, Louis (1994). The Passion of Al-Hallaj: Mystic and Martyr of Islam. Translated by Herbert Mason. Princeton University Press. ISBN 978-0-691019192.
- Sourdel, Dominique (1978). "al-Ḳāhir Bi'llāh". In van Donzel, E.; Lewis, B.; Pellat, Ch. & Bosworth, C. E. (eds.). The Encyclopaedia of Islam, Second Edition. Volume IV: Iran–Kha. Leiden: E. J. Brill. pp. 423–424. ISBN 978-90-04-05745-6. OCLC 758278456.
- Zetterstéen, K. V. (1987). "al-Ḳāhir Bi 'llāh". In Houtsma, Martijn Theodoor (ed.). E.J. Brill's first encyclopaedia of Islam, 1913–1936, Volume IV: 'Itk–Kwaṭṭa. Leiden: Brill. p. 627. doi:10.1163/2214-871X_ei1_SIM_3803. ISBN 978-90-04-08265-6.
