= Imamate in Zaydi doctrine =

Supreme political and religious leadership position

In Zaydi Islam, the imamate (Arabic: إمامة, romanized: imama) is the supreme political and religious leadership position. In common with other Shi'a sects, it is reserved for Alids—i.e., descendants of Muhammad via Ali ibn Abi Talib and Fatimah. Unlike the Twelver or Isma'ili imamate, however, it was not hereditary and could be claimed by any qualified Alid; nor were its holders ascribed semi-divine attributes of infallibility and miracle-working.

Necessary qualifications were a grounding in Islamic jurisprudence and a public call to allegiance, usually in the form of leadership of an uprising against unlawful authority. In practice, this meant there could be several Zaydi imams at the same time, even in the same region, or none at all. This resulted in the unique concept of a 'restricted' imamate for holders of political power who did not meet the scholarly credentials.

Moreover, the personal nature of the imamate for a long time prevented the rise of persistent institutions, rendering the Zaydi states established in Yemen and Tabaristan unstable. As a result, the imamate often came to be passed down in hereditary fashion, especially as the Imams of Yemen abandoned Zaydi doctrines for Sunni ones in the 18th century.

== History ==
Zaydism is a branch of Shi'a Islam established by the followers of Zayd ibn Ali (a great-grandson of Ali ibn Abi Talib, the son-in-law of Muhammad and fourth caliph), who in 740 launched an unsuccessful revolt against the Umayyad Caliphate, in which he died.

The revolt failed in large part due to lack of support by the Kufan Shi'a, who were divided over the thorny question of the legitimacy of the first three Rashidun caliphs—i.e., those who ruled before Ali ibn Abi Talib—Abu Bakr, Umar, and Uthman; the more radical Shi'a rejected them as usurpers, while the more moderate ones accepted them as legitimate imams (leaders) since Ali himself had pledged allegiance to them. Zayd's support for the moderate position cost him many followers, who instead followed his nephew, Ja'far al-Sadiq (d. 765). This event separated the Zaydis from the "Imami" variants of Shi'ism (the Twelvers and Isma'ilis) who followed al-Sadiq and his successors.

In Zaydi doctrine, unlike the Imami Shi'a, the imamate is not hereditary, nor is the imam a quasi-divine figure, without sin, possessed of infallibility (ismah), and capable of performing miracles. Likewise, Zaydi doctrine rejects core Imami doctrines like the occultation of imams, esoteric interpretations in Quranic exegesis, or the doctrine of dissimulation of one's beliefs (taqiyya). Apart from the emphasis on the imamate and its restriction to Ali's descendants, the Zaydi position, especially in modern times, is close to mainstream Sunnism, and Zaydism is sometimes considered as the fifth Sunni school (madhhab).

While the Imamis considered Sunnis as infidels, their early imams were politically quietist, accepting the rule of the Umayyad and later the Abbasid Caliphate. The Zaydis on the other hand adopted a more moderate religious position closer to Sunni beliefs, but were political radicals, with rebellion against illegitimate Umayyad and Abbasid authority becoming a core Zaydi tenet. As a result, the Zaydis backed a succession of legitimist Alid revolts: the rebellion of Abd Allah ibn Mu'awiya (744–747/8), the uprising of Muhammad al-Nafs al-Zakiyya (762–763), the uprising of al-Husayn ibn Ali al-Abid (786), the Daylam revolt of Yahya ibn Abdallah (792), the revolt of Ibn Tabataba in Iraq (814–815) and of Muhammad ibn al-Qasim in Talaqan (834), and of Yahya ibn Umar in Kufa (864).

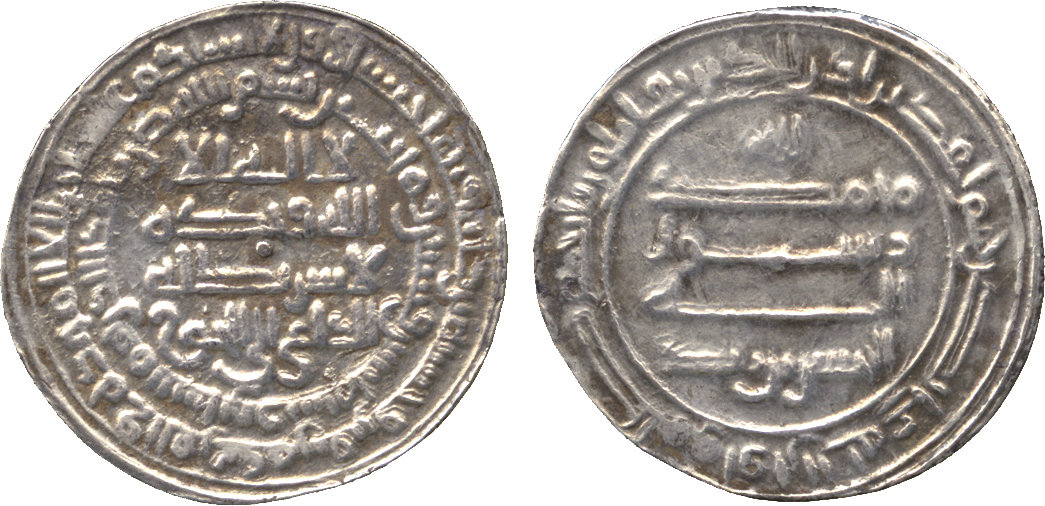
Silver dirham of Hasan ibn Zayd, the first Zaydi ruler of Tabaristan

These revolts were unsuccessful, proving that a direct confrontation with the caliphal government in the central lands of Islam was doomed to failure. The first successful Zaydi regime was indeed established in Morocco, at the westernmost extremity of the Islamic world, by Idris ibn Abdallah, who fled the suppression of the 786 uprising. During the 9th century, Zaydi missionary efforts gained ground in two other peripheral regions of the Islamic world: the mountains of northern Yemen, and the mountains of Tabaristan, Daylam, and Gilan on the southern shores of the Caspian Sea.

A Zaydi emirate was established in Tabaristan in 864, which survived as a regional power until the 12th century. The last remnants of the Caspian Zaydis ruled Lahijan and converted to Twelver Shi'ism in 1526/7. In Yemen, a Zaydi state was established in 897 at Saada, which remains the heartland of Yemeni Zaydism to the present day; a series of Zaydi Imams of Yemen ruled much of the highlands of Upper Yemen in the medieval and early modern period, even though their rule was contested and interrupted by foreign imperial powers, most notably the Ottoman Empire. In the 17th century, the Zaydi Qasimi State evicted the Ottomans and came to rule all of Yemen, but to bolster their own power, the imams gradually moved away from Hadawi Zaydism and adopted doctrines that brought them nearer to Sunni practice and legitimated their hereditary, monarchical rule.

== Eligibility for the imamate ==
Early Zaydis were divided in two camps, the moderate Batriyya, that was closer to proto-Sunnism and prevailed in the 8th century, and the more radical Jarudiyya, which leaned far more towards early Shi'a doctrines, and eventually became the dominant strain by the 9th century. In common with all Shi'a groups, the Batriyya held that Ali was the rightful successor to Muhammad, being "the most excellent of men" after the Prophet himself. At the same time, unlike the other Shi'a groups, they held that since Ali had consented to obey them, Abu Bakr and Umar were rightful leaders, while Uthman was so for the first half of his reign, prior to his attempts to raise his own, Umayyad clan over all others.

From this, the Batriyya accepted that imams did not have to be the most excellent member of the Muslim community, as was the case in the Basran school of Mu'tazilism and in Khariji doctrine. The Jarudiyya on the other hand followed the Imami Shi'a in rejecting the first three caliphs as illegitimate and usurpers of Ali's rightful place, holding that he and his sons Hasan (d. 670) and Husayn (d. 680) had been explicitly designated as successors of Muhammad.

The designation of Ali, Hasan, and Husayn makes them unique among Zaydi imams, although two different traditions exist: one holds that all three were explicitly designated as his successors by Muhammad, while another that they each appointed one another in turn. After the death of Husayn, eligibility for the imamate was left open to any qualified member of the Husaynid and Hasanid lines, although some Zaydi scholars until the 10th century extended eligibility to all Talibids (the descendants of Ali's father, Abu Talib ibn Abd al-Muttalib). A prospective imam had to be of sound body and mind so that he could rule, have an upright personal character, live a life of piety and probity, and have an extensive knowledge of Islamic jurisprudence and religious matters that qualified him as a mujtahid, up to and including the authorship of original works. A list of fourteen attributes was eventually established that qualified a candidate for the imamate.

Qualifications alone were not enough, however; while Zaydi doctrine affirmed the establishment of an imam at all times as an obligation incumbent upon the Muslim community, the imamate could not be passed by contract, election or designation, but had to be claimed by issuing a 'call' or 'summons' (da'wa) which had to be made via public pronouncement to 'rise up' (khuruj)—the terms 'rising' (qiyama) or 'emergence' (zuhur) are also used—to which all true Muslims had to respond by declaring their allegiance. In practice the latter meant an armed rebellion, hence a minimum number of armed support (nusrah) was specified and fixed at 313 followers, based on the number of Muhammad's followers at the Battle of Badr. Crucially, the da'wa was not contingent upon the popularity of the candidate or a general consensus of the Muslims; the prospective imam was compelled to rise by God, and his success depended on God alone.

In more practical terms, leadership of a successful uprising against a tyrannical oppressor was proof of the imam's political and military abilities. On the other hand, it was expected that the "most excellent" candidate could be imam, hence if another, more excellent one, were to arise, the incumbent imam would be bound to surrender authority to him. Likewise, any moral transgressions or loss of the qualifying attributes rendered the legitimacy of the imamate void.

The historian Najam Haider sums up the Zaydi imamate as follows: "a qualified candidate earned followers through his scholarly and personal qualities and seized power through his military prowess. The ideal Zaydī Imām was both a 'man of the pen' and a 'man of the sword'." Unlike the Imami Shi'a, who consider their imams to be religious leaders first and foremost, vested with infallibility on matters of doctrine, the political aspects of the imamate were uniquely central to the Zaydi conception of the office: the Zaydi imams were recognized merely as knowledgeable individuals, whose judgment was potentially fallible and represented a "best guess" at God's will, and not inherently superior to the rulings of other Zaydi scholars. Only the collective consensus of the Hasanids and Husaynids could unequivocally establish the correctness or not of doctrinal issues.

== Implications ==
In practice, the intensely personal nature of the Zaydi imamate, bound as it was with the charisma and abilities of the individual imam, ran contrary to the creation of a long-lasting, institutionalized Zaydi statehood: the succession was never regulated, often resulting in the proclamations of several rival candidates; the judicial authority was vested in the imam and could not be delegated, precluding the emergence of a bureaucracy, offices like a chief judge (qadi), or even a uniform legal code, as every imam had the right to interpret the law at will; and even the military support an imam enjoyed was voluntarily provided by his followers, instead of relying on an organized army. Historian Bernard Haykel emphasizes the transient and ephemeral nature of Zaydi political structures, ascribing it to their "oppositional quality": the Zaydis were most effective when focused against an enemy they could fight.

Governing an extensive and diverse realm, such as the Qasimi State that emerged in Yemen during the 17th century, required different methods. This contributed, according to Haykel, to the Qasimi State's progressive Sunnification, which allowed the creation of more permanent offices and institutions, forming a judicial and court bureaucracy along the lines long established in non-Zaydi Muslim states—indeed, often taken over from the previous Ottoman administration. Crucially, this process also provided an alternative means of legitimacy for its rulers, who by and large lacked the necessary qualities prescribed in Zaydi doctrine and relied almost exclusively on dynastic legitimacy and military might, couched in Sunni legal formulas that prohibited rebellion.

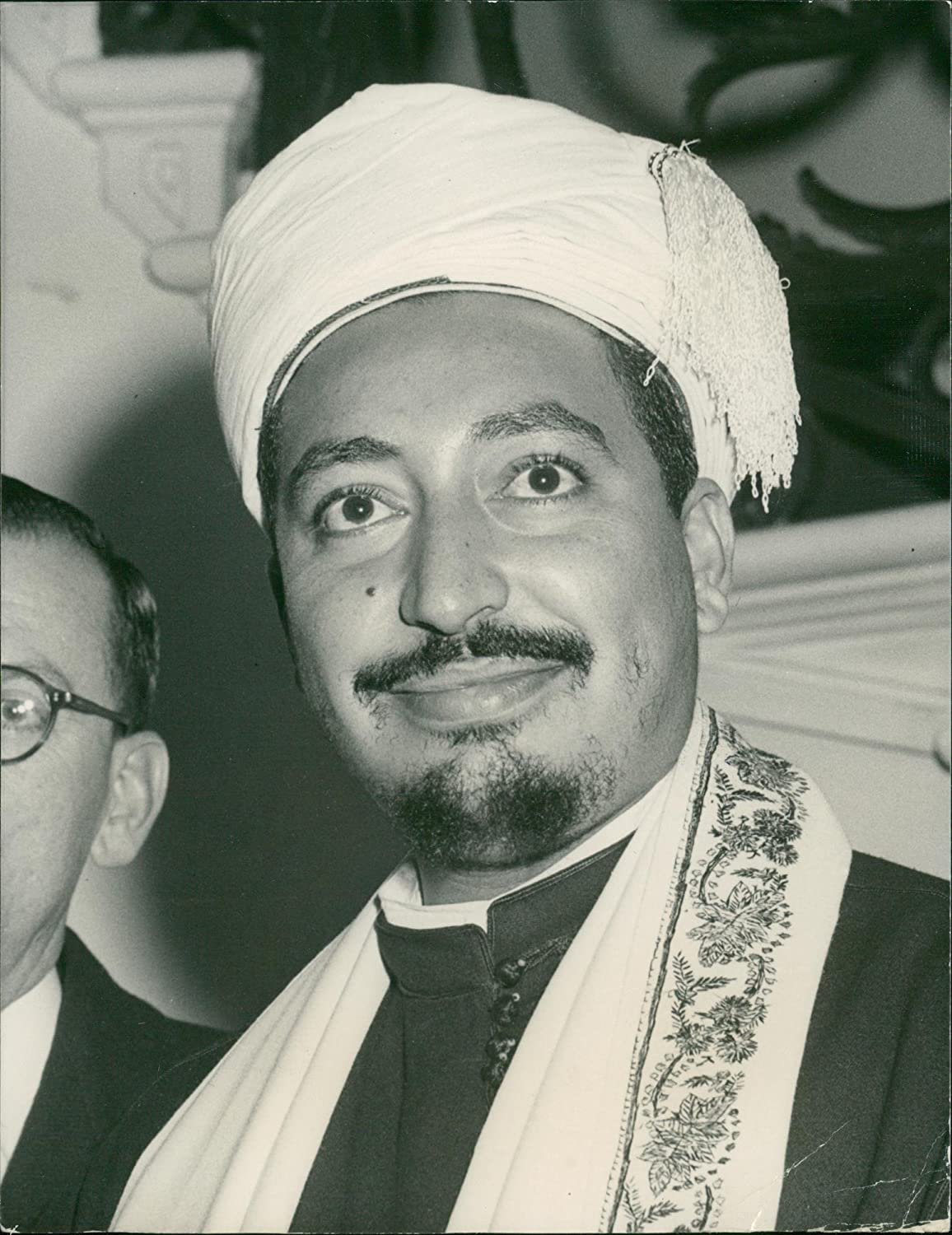
Muhammad al-Badr, last Imam and King of Yemen

Furthermore, while the imam was held to be unique across the Muslim community, this was not always so in practice: apart from succession disputes, the existence of widely separated Zaydi states in Yemen and northern Iran sometimes led to the existence of two distinct imams at the same time. While they often recognized each other's legitimacy, this was an exception that was not reflected in doctrine. Likewise, the required high standard of erudition on jurisprudence disqualified many actual Alid potentates from the imamate, even though they might already hold secular power. As a result, the intermediate rank of a 'restricted' imam (muhtasib) or 'summoner' (da'i) was used, denoting a ruler seen as legitimate by the Zaydis and charged with governing and defending the community, but with limited authority compared to full imams (sabiqun, lit. 'precursors'), who could levy taxes, mete out punishments, and even conduct offensive war.

Haider notes that the uniquely Zaydi concept of a 'restricted' imam is another indication of the centrality of political considerations, as "the Zaydı̄ Imāmate was predicated on the exercise of political authority", while the knowledge-focused requirements could be delegated via the consultation of qualified religious scholars. The term appeared very early on, as several early Zaydi rulers in Tabaristan were mere 'summoners', while later Zaydi Alids in northern Iran simply adopted the generic and entirely secular title of emir (amir). It was in Yemen, however, that the concept of the 'restricted' imamate was systematized, as many of the later Qasimi rulers lacked the qualifications for the full imamate. As a result of all these controversies, there never was a definitive list of commonly accepted Zaydi imams, even to this day.

There is a wide array of domestic opponents to Houthi rule in Yemen, ranging from the conservative Sunni Islah Party to the secular socialist Southern Movement to the radical Islamists of Al Qaeda in the Arabian Peninsula and, since 2014, the Islamic State – Yemen Province.

== Imams of Zaidis ==
The Imams of Yemen constitute one line of Zaidi imams.

A timeline indicating Zaidi Imams in the early period amongst other Shia Imams as listed in Al-Masaabeeh fee As-Seerah by Ahmad bin Ibrahim is as follows:

1. Ali ibn Abi Talib
2. Al-Hasan ibn Ali ibn Abi Talib
3. Al-Husayn ibn Ali ibn Abi Talib
4. ʿAlī Zayn al-ʿĀbidīn ibn Al-Ḥusayn ibn Ali
5. Hasan al-Mu'thannā ibn Al-Ḥasan ibn Ali
6. Zayd ibn ʿAlī Zayn al-ʿĀbidīn ibn Al-Ḥusayn
7. Yahya ibn Zayd ibn ʿAlī Zayn al-ʿĀbidīn
8. Muhammad al-Nafs al-Zakiyya ibn ʿAbd Allāh al-Kāmīl ibn Ḥasan al-Mu'thanā
9. Ibrahim ibn ʿAbd Allāh al-Kāmīl ibn Ḥasan al-Mu'thannā
10. Abdullah ibn Muhammad al-Nafs al-Zakiyya ibn ʿAbd Allāh al-Kāmīl ibn Ḥasan al-Mu'thannā
11. Al-Ḥasan ibn Ibrahim ibn ʿAbd Allāh al-Kāmīl ibn Ḥasan al-Mu'thannā
12. Al-Ḥusayn ibn ʿAlī al-ʿĀbid ibn Ḥasan al-Mu'thallath ibn Ḥasan al-Mu'thannā
13. ʿĪsā (Father of Aḥmad) ibn Zayd ibn ʿAlī Zayn al-ʿĀbidīn
14. Yāhyā ibn ʿAbd Allāh al-Kāmīl ibn Ḥasan al-Mu'thannā
15. Idris I ibn ʿAbd Allāh al-Kāmīl ibn Ḥasan al-Mu'thannā
16. Muḥammad ibn Ibrāhīm Ṭabāṭabā ibn Ismāʿīl al-Dībāj ibn Ibrāhīm al-Ghamr ibn al-Ḥasan al-Mu'thannā
17. Muḥammad ibn Muḥammad ibn Zayd ibn ʿAlī Zayn al-ʿĀbidīn
18. Muḥammad ibn Sulayman ibn Dawud ibn al-Ḥasan al-Mu'thannā
19. Al-Qāsīm ibn Ibrāhīm Ṭabāṭabā ibn Ismāʿīl al-Dībāj ibn Ibrāhīm al-Ghamr ibn al-Ḥasan al-Mu'thannā
20. Yaḥyā ibn al-Ḥusayn ibn Al-Qāsīm ibn Ibrāhīm Ṭabāṭabā ibn Ismāʿīl al-Dībāj ibn Ibrāhīm al-Ghamr ibn al-Ḥasan al-Mu'thannā
- (Idrisid dynasty was established in Morocco in 803)
1. Idris II ibn Idris I
2. Muhammad ibn Idris II
3. Ali I ibn Muhammad
4. Yahya I ibn Muhammad
5. Yahya II ibn Yahya I
6. Ali II ibn Umar ibn Idris II
7. Yahya III ibn Al-Qasim ibn Idris II
8. Yahya IV ibn Idris ibn Umar ibn Idris II
9. Al-Hasan I ibn Muḥammad ibn Al-Qasim ibn Idris II
10. Al-Qasim Guennoun ibn Muḥammad ibn Al-Qasim ibn Idris II
11. Abul-Aish Ahmad ibn Al-Qasim Guennoun
12. Al-Hasan II ibn Al-Qasim Guennoun
- (Zaydid dynasty was established in Tabaristan in 864)
1. Hasan ibn Zayd ibn Muḥammad ibn Ismāʿīl ibn Hasan ibn Zayd ibn Hasan
2. Muḥammad ibn Zayd ibn Muḥammad
3. Hasan al-Utrush ibn Ali ibn Al-Hasan ibn Ali ibn Umar al-Ashraf ibn ʿAlī Zayn al-ʿĀbidīn
4. Hasan ibn Al-Qasim ibn Al-Hasan ibn Ali ibn Abd al-Rahman ibn Al-Qāsīm ibn Hasan ibn Zayd ibn Hasan or Abu Muhammad Hasan ibn Qāsīm
5. Ahmad ibn Hasan or Abu'l-Husayn Ahmad ibn Hasan
6. Ja'far ibn Hasan or Abu'l-Qasim Ja'far ibn Hasan
7. Muḥammad ibn Ahmad or Abu Ali Muhammad ibn Ahmad
8. Husayn ibn Ahmad or Abu Ja'far Husayn ibn Ahmad
- (Ukhaydhirites dynasty was established in Najd in 866 after the revolt of Ismā'īl b. Yūsūfūʾl-Ukhayḍir b. Ibrāhīm b. Mūsā al-Jawn b. ʿAbd Allāh al-Kāmīl b. Ḥasan al-Mu'thannā b. Ḥasan al-Mujtabā)
1. Muḥammad ibn Yūsūfūʾl-Ukhayḍir ibn Ibrāhīm ibn Mūsā al-Jawn (brother of Isma'il ibn Yusufūʾl-Ukhayḍir)
2. Yūsūf ibn Muḥammad ibn Yūsūfūʾl-Ukhayḍir (son of Muḥammad ibn Yūsūfūʾl-Ukhayḍir & grandson of Yūsūfūʾl-Ukhayḍir ibn Ibrāhīm ibn Mūsā al-Jawn)
3. Isma'il ibn Yūsūf ibn Muḥammad (son of #2)
4. Al-Hasan ibn Yūsūf ibn Muḥammad (son of #2 & brother of #3)
5. Ahmad ibn Al-Hasan ibn Yūsūf (son of #4)
6. Abu'l-Muqallid Ja'far ibn Aḥmad ibn Al-Hasan (son of #5)
- (Rassid dynasty was established in Yemen in 897)
1. al-Hadi ila'l-Haqq Yahya ibn Al-Ḥusayn ibn Al-Qāsīm ibn Ibrāhīm Ṭabāṭabā
2. al-Murtada Muhammad ibn Yāhyā ibn Al-Husayn
3. An-Nasir Ahmad ibn Yāhyā ibn Al-Husayn
4. Al-Muntakhab al-Hasan ibn An-Nasir Ahmad ibn Yāhyā

== Sources ==
- Eagle, A. B. D. R. (1994). "Al-Hādī Yahyā b. al-Husayn b. al-Qāsim (245–98/859–911): A Biographical Introduction and the Background and Significance of his Imamate". New Arabian Studies. 2: 103–122. ISSN 1351-4709.
- Haider, Najam (2014). Shī'ī Islam: An Introduction. New York: Cambridge University Press. ISBN 978-1-107-03143-2.
- Haider, Najam (2021). "Zaydism" (PDF). Handbook of Islamic Sects and Movements. Brill Publishing. pp. 204–234. doi:10.1163/9789004435544_013. ISBN 978-90-04-43554-4.
- Haykel, Bernard (2003). Revival and Reform in Islam: The Legacy of Muhammad al-Shawkānī. New York: Cambridge University Press. ISBN 0-521-81628-9.
- Madelung, W. (1971). "Imāma". In Lewis, B.; Ménage, V. L.; Pellat, Ch. & Schacht, J. (eds.). The Encyclopaedia of Islam, Second Edition. Volume III: H–Iram. Leiden: E. J. Brill. pp. 1163–1169. doi:10.1163/1573-3912_islam_COM_0369. OCLC 495469525.
- Madelung, W. (2002). "Zaydiyya". In Bearman, P. J.; Bianquis, Th.; Bosworth, C. E.; van Donzel, E. & Heinrichs, W. P. (eds.). The Encyclopaedia of Islam, Second Edition. Volume XI: W–Z. Leiden: E. J. Brill. pp. 477–481. doi:10.1163/1573-3912_islam_COM_1385. ISBN 978-90-04-12756-2.
- Schmitz, Charles; Burrowes, Robert D. (2018). "Zaydism". Historical Dictionary of Yemen (Third ed.). Lanham, Maryland: Rowman & Littlefield. pp. 532–533. ISBN 9781538102329.
