= Hasan ibn Hasan =

Islamic scholar and theologian (c. 661–715)

Al-Hasan ibn al-Hasan الْحَسَنِ بْنِ الْحَسَنِ

4th Zaydi Imam
- In office 712–715
- Preceded by: Ali Zayn al-Abidin
- Succeeded by: Zayd ibn Ali

Personal life
- Born: c. 661 Medina, Hejaz, Arabia
- Died: c. 715 Medina, Umayyad Caliphate
- Buried: Al-Baqi Cemetery, Medina
- Spouse: Fatima bint al-Husayn; Umm al Fadl bint Muhammad al Hanafiyyah; Umm Musa bint ‘Umar-al atraf; Ramla bint Sa'id ibn Zayd; Habiba al-Rumiyya
- Children: Abd Allah; Ibrahim; al-Hasan; Ja'far; Da'wud; Muhammad; Ruqayya; Mulaykah; Umm al-Qasim (who was known as Qaseemah); Zaynab; Fatimah; Umm Kulthoom
- Parents: Hasan ibn Ali (father); Khawla bint Manzur (mother)
- Other name: Hasan al-Mu'thannā
- Relatives: List: Zayd ibn Hasan ibn Ali (brother); Hasan ibn Zayd ibn Hasan (nephew); Al-Qasim ibn Hasan (brother); Abd Allah ibn Hasan (brother); Bishr ibn Hasan (brother); Abu Bakr ibn Hasan (brother); Talha ibn Hasan (brother); Fatimah bint Hasan (sister); Husayn ibn Ali (uncle); Muhammad ibn al-Hanafiyya (half uncle)

Religious life
- Religion: Islam

Abū Muḥammad al-Ḥasan ibn al-Ḥasan ibn ʿAlī al-Hāshimī (Arabic: أَبُو مُحَمَّد الْحَسَنِ بْنِ الْحَسَنِ بْنِ عَلِي ٱلْهَاشِمِي, romanized: Abū Muḥammad al-Ḥasan ibn al-Ḥasan ibn ʿAlī al-Hāshimī, alias Hasan al-Mu'thannā; c. 661–715) was an Islamic scholar and theologian. He was a son of Hasan ibn Ali and Khawla bint Manzur. He was a grandson of the fourth caliph Ali (r. 656–661) and a great-grandson of the Islamic prophet Muhammad.

Al-Hasan ibn al-Hasan was a contemporary of Umayyad caliph al-Walid I.

== Life and political career ==
Hasan was born in Medina in c. 661. His father Hasan ibn Ali ruled briefly as caliph in 661 and was a grandson of the Islamic prophet Muhammad. Hasan's mother Khawla bint Manzur was a daughter of Manzur ibn Zaban, the chieftain of the Banu Fazara.

His mother was Khawla bint Manzur ibn Zaban ibn Sayyar Fazari. Hasan al-Muthanna was present in the Battle of Karbala. Ahmad ibn Ibrahim Hasani, in a tradition quoted from Abu Mikhnaf, he said that his age at that time was nineteen or twenty.

On the day of Ashura, he fought beside Imam Husayn and was injured and was kept as captive. His maternal uncle, Asma' ibn Kharijah Fazari, saved him. He was cured in Kufa; and after recovering, he returned to Medina.

Hasan ibn Hasan's uncle Husayn ibn Ali reportedly offered him to choose either of Husayn's two daughters Sukayna and Fatima, to be his wife. Hasan, who was too shy to accept, consequently chose Fatima, as she resembled his grandmother Fatima al-Zahra. Despite his Alid lineage, Hasan maintained a functional, albeit distant, relationship with the Umayyad state, notably engaging in formal correspondence with the Caliph al-Walid I.

== Theological and political views ==
In Sunni biographical literature, Hasan is portrayed as an intellectual who actively rejected political and theological extremism. According to classical sources, including Ibn Sa'd's Tabaqat al-Kubra, Hasan opposed the view that his lineage granted any special status or immunity.

Sunni traditions record that when questioned about the Hadith of Ghadir Khumm, Hasan rejected the assertion that Muhammad had explicitly appointed Ali as his political successor. He maintained that any such vital political appointment would have been made explicitly clear to the early Muslim community. The 14th-century hadith scholar Jamal al-Din al-Mizzi classified the chain of transmission for this narrative as highly authentic.

== Genealogy and progeny ==
Sayyed Ibn Tawus writes about the merit and nobility of Hasan ibn Hasan and some other children of Imam Hasan: "These are people whose lofty position and merit all Muslims acknowledged".

According to a part of a narration reported from Imam Reza about the continuation of the offspring of Imam Hasan and Imam Husayn, it is inferred that Hasan al-Muthanna had many children and Imam Hasan's offspring continued through him and another brother of his named Zayd. It has been reported in this tradition: "Hasan ibn Ali's offspring continued through two of his sons named Zayd and Hasan. Zayd had a son whose name was Hasan. Also, Hasan al-Muthanna had sons named Abd Allah al-Mahd, Ibrahim al-Ghamr and Hasan al-Muthallath from Fatima bint Husayn; Ja'far and Da'wud from Umm al-Walad; Muhammad from Ramla bint Sa'id ibn Zayd; who continued a third generation of Imam Hasan."

Although genealogically senior, Hasan's descendants never managed to establish serious claims to the imamate (other than Zaydism and Imams of Yemen). Moreover, many later shifted to Sunnism. The Banu Qatadah and the Hashemite dynasty claim descent from him.

=== Issue ===
The comparative genealogy of the Abbasid caliphs with their rival Zaydi imams

Abbasids

Caliphs of the Abbasid Caliphate
Caliphs of Cairo
Zaydi imams

ʿAbd al-Muṭṭalib ibn ʿHāshīm
ʾAbū Ṭālib ibn ʿAbd al-Muṭṭalib	Abū'l-Fādl al-ʿAbbās ibn ʿAbd al-Muṭṭalib	ʿAbd Allāh ibn ʿAbd al-Muṭṭalib
ʿAlīyyū'l-Murtaḍžā^{(1st Imām of Kaysāniyyā, Zaydīyyā, Imāmiyyā)}	Hibr al-Ummah ʿAbd Allāh ibn al-ʿAbbās	Khātam al-Nabiyyin; Abū'l-Qāsīm; Muḥammad ibn ʿAbd Allāh
Al-Ḥasan al-Mujtabā^{(2nd Imām of Kaysāniyyā, Zaydīyyā, Imāmiyyā)}	Hussayn ibn Ali^{(3rd Imām of Kaysāniyyā, Zaydīyyā, Imāmiyyā)}	Abū'l-Qāsīm Muḥammad al-Hānafīyya^{(4th Imām of Kaysāniyyā)}	ʿAlī ibn ʿAbd Allāh al-Sajjad
Al-Ḥasan al-Mu'thannā^{(5th Imām of Zaydiyyā)}	Ali al-Sajjad (Zayn al-ʿĀbidīn)^{(4th Imām of Zaydiyyā, Imāmiyyā)}	Abū Hāshīm ʿAbd Allāh ibn Muḥammad^{(5th Imām of Hāsheemīyyā)}	Muḥammad "al-Imām"^{(6th Imām of Hāsheemīyyā)} 716/7 - 743	ʿAbd Allāh ibn ʿAlī^{(Governor of Syria)} 750–754	Ṣāliḥ ibn ʿAlī^{(Governor of Egypt)} 750–751
ʿAbd Allāh al-Kāmīl ibn al-Ḥasan al-Mu'thannā	Zayd ibn Ali^{(6th Imām of Zaydiyyā)}	Ibrāhim (Ebrāheem) "al-Imām"^{(7th Imām of Hāsheemīyyā)} 743 - 749	Abū Jāʿfar ʿAbd Allāh al-Mānṣūr^{(2)} r. 754–775	Abū'l-ʿAbbās ʿAbd Allāh as-Saffāh^{(1)} r. 750–754	Mūsā ibn Muḥammad "al-Imām"
Nafsū'zZakiyya^{(First elected caliph by Ibrāhim, Mānṣūr, Saffāh, Imām Mālīk & Abū Ḥanīfa)}^{(8th Imām of Zaydiyyā)}	Yahya ibn Zayd^{(7th Imām of Zaydiyyā)}	Abū Muslīm al-Khurāsānī^{(Governor of Khurasan)} 748–755	Muḥammad al-Mahdī^{(3)} r. 775–785	Jāʿfar^{(Wali al-Ahd & Governor of Mosul)} 762–764	ʿĪsā ibn Mūsā^{(Governor of Kufa)} 750–765
ʿAbd Allāh; Shāh Ghāzī (ʿAbd Allāh ibn Muḥammad)^{(10th Imām of Zaydiyyā)}	Ibrāhīm ibn ʿAbd Allāh al-Kāmīl ibn al-Ḥasan al-Mu'thannā^{ibn Ḥasan al-Mujtabā}^{(9th Imām of Zaydiyyā)}	Al-Ḥusayn ibn ʿAlī al-ʿĀbid ibn al-Ḥasan al-Mu'thallath^{ibn Ḥasan al-Mu'thannā}^{(12th Imām of Zaydiyyā)}	Hārūn ar-Rāshīd^{(5)} r. 786–809	ʿMūsā al-Hādī^{(4)} r. 785–786	^{(The Governors)}: Mūsā ^{(Kufa, Egypt & Medina)}; Ismā'īl ^{(Egypt)}; Dā'wūd^{(Medina)}
Sulaymān^{ibn ʿAbd Allāh al-Kāmīl ibn al-Ḥasan II}^{(Emir of Tlemcen)}^{(Sulaymanid dynasty of Western Algeria)}	Yaḥyā^{ibn ʿAbd Allāh al-Kāmīl ibn al-Ḥasan al-Mu'thannā}^{(14th Imām of Zaydiyyā)}	Ibrāhīm Ṭabāṭabā^{ibn Ismāʿīl al-Dībādj ibn Ibrāhīm al-Ghamr ibn al-Ḥasan al-Mu'thannā}	Muḥammad al-Mu'tasim^{(8)} r. 833–842	Abd Allāh al-Ma'mun^{(7)} r. 813–833	Muḥammad al-Amin^{(6)} r. 809–813
Sūlaymān^{ibn ʿAbd Allāh as-Sālih ibn Mūsā al-Jawn ibn ʿAbd Allāh al-Kāmīl ibn al-Ḥasan al-Mu'thannā}	Idrīs the Elder ibn ʿAbd Allāh^{(Idrisid dynasty of Morocco)}^{(15th Imām of Zaydiyyā)}	Muḥammad ibn IbrāhīmṬabāṭabā^{(16th Imām of Zaydiyyā)}	Jāʿfar al-Mutawakkil^{(10)} r. 847–861	Muḥammad ibn Muḥammad al-Mu'tasim	Hārūn al-Wathiq^{(9)} r. 842–847
Mūsā II^{ibn ʿAbd Allāh as-Sâlih ibn Mūsā al-Jawn ibn ʿAbd Allāh al-Kāmīl}	Idrīs ibn Idrīs^{(2nd Zaydī Imām of Idrisids in Morocco)}	Muḥammad al-Muntasir^{(11)} r. 861–862	Ṭalḥa al-Muwaffaq^{(Regent)} 870–891	Aḥmad al-Musta'in^{(12)} r. 862–866	Muḥammad al-Muhtadi^{(14)} r. 869–870
Ismāʿīl ibn Yūsūf; Al-Ukhayḍhir^{ibn Ibrāhīm ibn Mūsā al-Jawn ibn ʿAbd Allāh al-Kāmīl ibn Ḥasan al-Mu'thannā}	Al-Qāsīm ar-Rassī ibn IbrāhīmṬabāṭabā^{(19th Imām of Zaydiyyā)}	Ibrahim al-Mu'ayyad^{(Wali al-Ahd & Governor of Syria)} 850–861	Aḥmad al-Mu'tadid^{(16)} r. 892–902	Muḥammad al-Mu'tazz^{(13)} r. 866–869	Aḥmad al-Mu'tamid^{(15)} r. 870–892
Muḥammad ibn Yūsūf; Al-Ukhayḍhir^{(1st Zaydī Imām of Ukhaydhirites in Najd and Al-Yamama)}	^{Abūʾl-Ḥusayn; Al-Hādī ilāʾl-Ḥaqq} Yaḥyā ibn al-Ḥusayn^{(1st Zaydī Imām of Rassids in Yemen)}	ʿAlī al-Muktafī^{(17)} r. 902–908	Jāʿfar al-Muqtadir^{(18)} r. 908–929, 929–932	Muḥammad al-Qāhir^{(19)} r. 929, 932–934	Jāʿfar al-Mufawwid^{(Wali al-Ahd)} 875–892
Zayd ibn al-Ḥasan al-Mujtabā ibn ʿAlī ibn Abī Ṭālib	ʿAbd Allāh al-Mustakfī^{(22)} r. 944–946	Al-Faḍl al-Mutīʿ^{(23)} r. 946–974	Ishāq ibn Jāʿfar al-Muqtadir	Muḥammad al-Rādī^{(20)} r. 934–940	Ībrāhīm al-Muttaqī^{(21)} r. 940–944
Ḥasan ibn Zayd ibn al-Ḥasan al-Mujtabā ibn ʿAlīyyū'l-Murtaḍžā	ʿUmar al-Ashraf ibn ʿAlī Zayn al-ʿĀbidīn ibn al-Ḥusayn	ʿAbd al-Karīm al-Ṭāʾiʿ^{(24)} r. 974–991	Aḥmad al-Qāʿdīr^{(25)} r. 991–1031
Ismāʿīl ibn Ḥasan ibn Zayd ibn al-Ḥasan al-Mujtabā	ʿAlī ibn ʿUmar al-Ashraf ibn ʿAlī Zayn al-ʿĀbidīn	Al-Ḥusayn Dhu'l-Dam'a ibn Zayd ibn ʿAlī Zayn al-ʿĀbidīn	ʿAbd Allāh al-Qāʿīm^{(26)} r. 1031–1075
Muḥammad ibn Ismāʿīl ibn Ḥasan ibn Zayd	Al-Ḥasan ibn ʿAlī ibn ʿUmar al-Ashraf	Yaḥyā ibn al-Ḥusayn Dhu'l-Dam'a ibn Zayd	Muḥammad Dhakīrat ad-Dīn^{(Wali al-Ahd)} 1039–1056
Zayd ibn Muḥammad ibn Ismāʿīl ibn Ḥasan	ʿAlī ibn al-Ḥasan ibn ʿAlī ibn ʿUmar al-Ashraf	ʿUmar ibn Yaḥyā ibn al-Ḥusayn Dhu'l-Dam'a	ʿAbd Allāh al-Mūqtādī^{(27)} r. 1075–1094
^{Al-Dāʿī al-Kabīr} Hasan ibn Zayd^{(1st Zaydī Imām of Zaydīds in Tabaristan)}	^{Al-Dāʿī al-Ṣaghīr} Muhammad ibn Zayd^{(2nd Zaydī Imām of Zaydīds in Tabaristan)}	Yaḥyā ibn ʿUmar^{(20th Imām of Zaydiyyā in Samarra)}	Aḥmad al-Mūstāzhīr^{(28)} r. 1094–1118
^{Al-Nāṣir liʾl-Ḥāqq} Hasan al-Utrush^{(3rd Zaydī Imām of Zaydīds in Tabaristan)}	Al-Faḍl al-Mūstārshīd^{(29)} r. 1118–1135
Al-Mānṣūr al-Rāshīd^{(30)} r. 1135–1136
Muḥammad al-Mūqtāfī^{(31)} r. 1136–1160	Alī ibn al-Faḍl al-Qabī
Yūsuf al-Mūstānjīd^{(32)} r. 1160–1170	al-Hāsān ibn Alī
Al-Hāssān al-Mūstādī'^{(33)} r. 1170–1180	Abū Bakr ibn al-Hāsān
Aḥmad al-Nāsīr^{(34)} r. 1180–1225	Abi 'Alī al-Hāsān ibn Abū Bakr
Muḥammad az-Zāhīr^{(35)} r. 1225–1226	Malīka'zZāhīr Rūkn ad-Dīn Baybars^{(Mamluk Sultanate Sultan of Egypt)} r. 1260–1277
Al-Mānsūr al-Mūstānsīr^{(36)} r. 1226–1242	Abū'l-Qāsim Aḥmad al-Mūstānsīr^{(1)} r. 1261	Abū'l-ʿAbbās Aḥmad al-Hakim I^{(2)} r. 1262–1302
ʿAbd Allāh al-Mūstā'sīm^{(37)} r. 1242–1258	Abū'r-Rabīʿ Sulaymān al-Mustakfī I^{(3)} r. 1302–1340	Aḥmad ibn Aḥmad al-Ḥākim bi-amr Allāh
Abū'l-ʿAbbās Aḥmad al-Hakim II^{(5)} r. 1341–1352	Abū'l-Fatḥ Abū Bakr al-Mu'tadid I^{(6)} r. 1352–1362	Abū Isḥāq Ibrāhīm al-Wāṯiq I^{(4)} r. 1340–1341
Abū ʿAbd Allāh Muḥammad al-Mutawakkil I^{(7)} r. 1362–1377, 1377–1383, 1389–1406	Abū Yāḥyā Zakariyāʾ al-Musta'sim^{(8)} r. 1377, 1386–1389	Abū Ḥafs ʿUmar al-Wāṯiq II^{(9)} r. 1383–1386
Abū'l-Faḍl al-ʿAbbās al-Musta'īn^{(10)} r. 1406–1414; Sultan of Egypt r. 1412	Abū'l-Fatḥ Dāwud al-Mu'tadīd II^{(11)} r. 1414–1441	Abū'r-Rabīʿ Sulaymān al-Mustakfī II^{(12)} r. 1441–1451	Yaʿqūb ibn Muḥammad al-Mutawakkil ʿalā'Llāh	Abū'l-Baqāʾ Ḥamza al-Qāʾim^{(13)} r. 1451–1455	Abū'l-Maḥāsin Yūsuf al-Mustanjid^{(14)} r. 1455–1479
Abū'l-ʿIzz ʿAbd al-ʿAzīz al-Mutawakkil II^{(15)} r. 1479–1497
Abū'ṣ-Ṣabr Yaʿqūb al-Mustamsik^{(16)} r. 1497–1508, 1516–1517
Muḥammad al-Mutawakkil III^{(17)} r. 1508–1516, 1517

== Bibliography ==
- Marsham, Andrew (2022). "Kinship, Dynasty, and the Umayyads". In Osti, Letizia; van Berkel, Maaike (eds.). The Historian of Islam at Work: Essays in Honor of Hugh N. Kennedy. Leiden: Brill. pp. 12–45. ISBN 978-90-04-52523-8.
- Madelung, Wilferd (1997). The Succession to Muhammad: A Study of the Early Caliphate. Cambridge University Press. ISBN 978-0-52-164696-3.
