= Yahya ibn Abdallah =

8th-century Alid and Zaydi leader

Yahya ibn Abdallah يحيى بن عبد الله
- Born: 728 CE; Medina
- Died: 791 CE; Baghdad
- Children: Ibrahim ibn Yahya; Saleh bin Yahya; Isa ibn Yahya; Muhammad ibn Yahya
- Parents: ʿAbd Allāh (father); Qurayba bint Rukayh (mother)

Yaḥyā ibn ʿAbd Allāh ibn al-Ḥasan ibn al-Ḥasan ibn ʿAlī ibn Abī Ṭālib (Arabic: يحيى بن عبد الله بن الحسن بن الحسن بن علي بن أبي طالب; c. 745/6–803) was an Alid and Zaydi leader who led a rebellion against the Abbasid caliph Harun al-Rashid in Daylam in 792. He was soon obliged to capitulate, but his activity began the spread of Zaydi Islam in the remote mountains of Daylam. After his surrender, he was initially treated with much honour, but Harun remained deeply suspicious of his popularity and intentions, and recalled him to Baghdad, where he spent the remainder of his life in prison. In 802, the Barmakid Ja'far ibn Yahya helped him escape, but he was captured; the event led to the execution of the Barmakids, once Harun's closest companions. Yahya died in prison, probably in 803.

== Biography ==
=== Origin and early life ===
Yahya was a great-great-grandson of Ali ibn Abi Talib, the son-in-law of Muhammad and first Shi'a imam. His mother, Qurayba bint Rukayh, was one of the wives of his father, and niece of the mother of his half-brothers, Muhammad al-Nafs al-Zakiyya and Ibrahim.

Yahya was born around 745/6. Shortly after his birth, in 748–750, the Abbasid Revolution overthrew the Umayyad Caliphate (661–750) and established the Abbasid dynasty at the helm of the Islamic world. The change of dynasty was not a mere succession struggle, but the culmination of a broad social and political movement that rejected the Umayyad regime, which was widely regarded as oppressive, too dependent on and favouring its Syrian heartland to the exclusion of other areas, and more concerned with the worldly aspects of the caliphate than the teachings of Islam. A widespread belief at the time favoured replacing Umayyad dynastic rule with that of a "chosen one from the Family of Muhammad" (al-Rida min Al Muhammad), who alone would have the divine guidance necessary to interpret the Quran and create a truly Islamic government that would bring justice to the Muslim community, treating all Muslims equally regardless of their origin. In the first instance this meant the Alids, who claimed descent from Muhammad via Ali ibn Abi Talib, and to whom Yahya's family belonged. However, the Abbasids exploited the vagueness of the slogan by portraying themselves as also being members of the wider "Family of the Prophet" through their common descent from the Banu Hashim clan. This claim was rejected by later Shi'a writers, who restricted membership in the Family of the Prophet to the Alids and thus considered the Abbasids as usurpers, but this distinction was not so clear-cut at the time, and the Abbasid claims appear to have been widely accepted when they came to power. As a result, the relationship between the Abbasid dynasty and the Alids was ambivalent and underwent many changes. The Abbasids tried to secure Alid support, or at least acquiescence, to their rule through the award of salaries and honours at court. Nevertheless, many Alids, chiefly of the Zaydi and Hasanid (to which Yahya belonged) branches, continued to reject the Abbasids as usurpers, and several went into hiding and once again tried to rouse the discontented against the new regime.

As a result of these tensions, Yahya's father was imprisoned by the Abbasid caliph al-Mansur (r. 754–775) in 758, and Yahya was taken in and brought up by Ja'far al-Sadiq, a noted scholar who is considered as the sixth imam of the Imami (i.e., Twelver and Isma'ili) branches of Shi'ism. Al-Sadiq made Yahya one of his deputies, and was a major influence on Yahya's own legal opinions, and his utterances on legal matters are held in high regard by Imami scholars, as transmissions of al-Sadiq's views. In 762–763, Yahya's half-brothers, Muhammad al-Nafs al-Zakiyya and Ibrahim launched a major but unsuccessful rebellion against al-Mansur at Medina and Basra. Yahya was too young to take part in the uprising, but, along with his brother Idris, he played a prominent role in the revolt of his nephew, al-Husayn ibn Ali al-Abid, that ended at the Battle of Fakhkh, near Mecca, in 786.

=== Travels and rebellion in Daylam ===
Following the defeat of the Alids and their supporters, Yahya, Idris, and a few others were sheltered by a Khuza'i tribesman, who helped them flee Arabia to the Kingdom of Aksum (in modern Ethiopia). Yahya and Idris spent some time there as guests of the king, before returning to Arabia, and meeting with some Alid loyalists near Mecca. At this meeting, it was decided that the two brothers were to split, each going to a different place in the periphery of the Abbasid empire: Idris went to the Maghreb, where he founded an independent dynasty in what is now Morocco, and Yahya to Yemen. The medieval sources provide diverging information on Yahya's movements during the next years. The most reliable account holds that he went to Yemen, Upper Mesopotamia, Armenia, and Baghdad, where he was recognized and forced again to flee to Yemen, where he stayed at Sana'a for eight months. It is likely during this time (c. 790/91) that the young scholar al-Shafi'i, the founder of one of the four schools of jurisprudence of Sunni Islam, came to visit him and was taught by him. From Yemen, Yahya moved to Khurasan. It was there that he learned of the death of his brother Idris, victim to poisoning by the Caliph Harun al-Rashid (r. 786–809). This prompted him to seek refuge in Tabaristan, a mountainous region along the southern shore of the Caspian Sea that had only been under Abbasid rule since 761, but where the highlands remained in the hands of autonomous local dynasties who were still Zoroastrian and occasionally rose in revolt against the Abbasid governors. Yahya wrote to one of them, the Bavandid ruler Sharwin I (r. 772–817), requesting asylum for three years. Sharwin agreed, but counselled Yahya to seek refuge with the neighbouring king of Daylam, Justan I (r. 791–805), who would be better able to protect him from the Abbasids. Following that advice, Yahya arrived in Daylam in 791/2, and was soon joined there by many supporters, proclaiming a revolt in 792.

The Caliph in response entrusted the suppression of the revolt to his trusted aide, the Barmakid al-Fadl ibn Yahya, naming him governor of Tabaristan and the neighbouring provinces, and giving him an army of 50,000 men. Al-Fadl sent letters to Yahya and Justan, promising a pardon for the former and a million silver dirhams to the latter, if they laid down their arms. Yahya was eventually moved to accept the offer; according to his own later account, this was because of dissension among his own followers, and because the wife of the king of Daylam urged her husband to accept as well. Yahya took precautions against possible treachery by carefully composing the letter of pardon for himself and seventy unnamed followers, had the Caliph himself write it out, and a number of prominent scholars, jurists, and members of the Abbasid dynasty endorse it. He only surrendered to al-Fadl after obtaining a letter of safe-passage from him.

Another account also tells how Yahya first travelled to the eastern regions of Juzjan, Balkh, and even Transoxiana, where he supposedly stayed with the khaghan of the Turks. The veracity of this report is considered dubious, but it is notable that when al-Fadl ibn Yahya was eventually sent against Yahya shortly after, al-Fadl is reliably recorded to have first defeated the khaghan. On the other hand, another report that al-Fadl was the one to encourage Yahya to seek refuge in Daylam and rise in revolt, and that his dispatch to suppress it was a test of his loyalty by the Caliph, is rejected by modern historians.

Although Yahya's uprising failed, it did mark the beginning of the spread of Zaydi Shi'ism among the populations of the region. The Daylamites converted by him to Islam later called themselves "helpers of the Mahdi" (ansar al-mahdi).

=== Persecution and death ===
Initially, Yahya was welcomed in Baghdad with great honour, and he received lavish gifts—200,000 or even 400,000 gold dinars—from the Caliph and al-Fadl. His arrival in the Abbasid capital was heralded as a sign of reconciliation between the Alids and the Abbasids. Nevertheless, Harun al-Rashid remained suspicious, and tried to keep him in Baghdad where he could be kept under control, whereas the letter of pardon explicitly guaranteed Yahya the right to go wherever he wanted. As a result, the Caliph had to allow Yahya to go for the Hajj to Mecca. Afterwards, Yahya did not return to Baghdad but moved to his family's estates near Medina, with the permission of al-Fadl. This was done without the Caliph's permission, or even knowledge; al-Fadl, who scrupulously observed the stipulations of the agreement, even ignored the Caliph's request to bring Yahya back to Baghdad. Al-Fadl's actions were in line with the Barmakids' favoured policy of reconciliation with the Alids. The reasons behind this are unclear, but the Barmakids may possibly have aspired to the Abbasids' establishing a more absolutist and theocratic regime, based on a divine mandate similar to that claimed by the Shi'a for the Alids, and to that advocated half a century later by the Mu'tazilites.

Now free of the Caliph's control, Yahya spent much of the sums he had received to pay the debt of al-Husayn ibn Ali al-Abid, and provide for other Alids who were in need of money. To prevent any possible Alid uprising led by Yahya, the suspicious Harun al-Rashid appointed Abdallah ibn Mus'ab al-Zubayri (796/97) and soon after his son, Bakkar (797–809), as governors of Medina. As descendants of Abd Allah ibn al-Zubayr, who had claimed the caliphate during the Second Islamic Civil War, they were vehemently hostile to the Alids. Bakkar especially soon began denouncing Yahya as behaving like another caliph, and sent alarming reports to Harun al-Rashid about the affection and respect he commanded among the common people, who came from afar to visit him.

Alarmed at this, Harun al-Rashid had Yahya brought back to Baghdad, where he was kept alternately in prison or in house arrest. Several stories tell of his maltreatment at the Caliph's hands, but most of them contain obviously fictional elements and contradict each other. In 800, Abdallah ibn Mus'ab ibn Thabit appeared before Harun al-Rashid and claimed that he had received summons (da'wa) on behalf of Yahya for an uprising, and argued that, given his well-known antipathy to the Alids, if he been contacted, then the entire rest of the court must already have sided with Yahya. The Caliph had Yahya brought to him and confronted the two men. The Alid denied the accusation, and demanded a trial by oath (mubahala): Yahya cursed Abdallah, who indeed died on the same day (29 March 809), resulting in Yahya being cleared of all charges.

This did not stay Harun al-Rashid's suspicions for long. The Caliph was particularly irritated by the use that Yahya made of the blanket pardon for seventy unnamed followers of his: while Yahya refused to name them, whenever one of his followers was captured, Yahya claimed that he was one of those seventy. Frustrated, the Caliph convened an assembly of jurists to reassess the validity of the pardon. When one of them, Muhammad al-Shaybani, declared that the letter of pardon was not only valid, but inviolable, the irate Caliph threw his inkstand at him. According to one account, the Caliph had Yahya ibn Khalid al-Barmaki (the father of al-Fadl) testify to the assembly that Yahya's agents were gathering the pledge of allegiance from the common people of Baghdad, and that a courier on his way to Balkh had been intercepted, with letters calling for an uprising in Khurasan. Eventually, the qadi Abu al-Bakhtari Wahb ibn Wahb declared the letter as invalid and cut it with a knife.

Harun al-Rashid nevertheless hesitated to proceed publicly against Yahya. Instead, he handed him over to another Barmakid, al-Fadl's brother Ja'far, with instructions that he was to kill him. However, Yahya managed to persuade Ja'far to allow him to escape instead, with the promise that he would go into exile in the Byzantine Empire for as long as Harun al-Rashid lived. Ja'far let his prisoner go, but Yahya was captured at the border town of al-Massisa, and brought before the local governor, Muhammad ibn Khalid, another Barmakid. Muhammad immediately recognized Yahya, and was terrified: if Ja'far's action became known to the Caliph, the life of all Barmakids would be forfeit. Muhammad thus quickly went to meet the Caliph, who was on the Hajj to Mecca in 802. Harun al-Rashid kept the affair quiet for the moment, but once he returned from the Hajj, he ordered Ja'far executed, and all other Barmakids—apart from Muhammad ibn Khalid—arrested and their properties confiscated. The downfall of the Barmakids is shrouded in mystery, and its true causes are still not known with certainty; it may be that Harun al-Rashid wanted to rid himself of a group that might threaten or limit his own power. The brutal manner in which Ja'far was executed, however, is directly linked to his allowing Yahya's escape by Abu Muhammad al-Yazidi, whom the great 10th-century historian al-Tabari held to be the most authoritative source on the Barmakid family.

Following the downfall of the Barmakids, Yahya was given over to al-Sindi ibn Shahak, the security chief (sahib al-shurta) of the capital, who just three years earlier had been responsible for the death of the Twelver imam Musa al-Kazim. Yahya died soon after while still in prison, probably in 803; his grandson Idris recorded that he was left to die of starvation and thirst. Some unreliable accounts hold that he was buried alive near Rayy in 805 or that he escaped from prison.

== Sources ==
- Bosworth, C. E., ed. (1989). The History of al-Ṭabarī, Volume XXX: The ʿAbbāsid Caliphate in Equilibrium: The Caliphates of Mūsā al-Hādī and Hārūn al-Rashīd, A.D. 785–809/A.H. 169–192. SUNY Series in Near Eastern Studies. Albany, New York: State University of New York Press. ISBN 978-0-88706-564-4.
- Kennedy, Hugh (2004) [1986]. The Prophet and the Age of the Caliphates: The Islamic Near East from the 6th to the 11th Century (Second ed.). Harlow: Longman. ISBN 978-0-582-40525-7.
- Madelung, W. (2002). "Yaḥyā b. ʿAbd Allāh". In Bearman, P. J.; Bianquis, Th.; Bosworth, C. E.; van Donzel, E. & Heinrichs, W. P. (eds.). The Encyclopaedia of Islam, Second Edition. Volume XI: W–Z. Leiden: E. J. Brill. pp. 242–243. doi:10.1163/1573-3912_islam_SIM_7947. ISBN 978-90-04-12756-2.
- Madelung, W. (1975). "The Minor Dynasties of Northern Iran". In Frye, Richard N. (ed.). The Cambridge History of Iran: From the Arab Invasion to the Saljuqs. Vol. 4. Cambridge: Cambridge University Press. pp. 198–249. ISBN 0-521-20093-8.
- van Arendonk, Cornelis (1960) [1919]. Les débuts de l'imāmat zaidite au Yemen [The Beginnings of the Zaydi Imamate in the Yemen] (in French). Translated by Jacques Ryckmans. Leiden: E. J. Brill. ISBN 978-90-04-00715-4.
