= Sulayman I of Tlemcen =

Emir of Tlemcen from 786 to 814

Sulaymān I سليمان الأول

Emir of Tlemcen
- Reign: 786 – 814
- Coronation: Emir of Tlemcen
- Successor: Muhammad II
- Born: c. 730; Arabia
- Died: 814; Aïn El Hout (Algeria)
- Issue: 1.Muhammad bin Sulayman 2.Daud bin Sulayman
Names
- Sulayman Ibn Abd Allah al-Kamil
- Dynasty: Sulaymanids
- Father: 'Abd Allah al-Kamil
- Mother: 'Atika bint Abd al-Malik.

Sulaymān I, (full name Sulaymān Ibn ʿAbd Allāh al-Kāmil, Arabic: سليمان بن عبد الله الكامل), sometimes called Sidi Sliman or Moulay Slimane, was the brother of Idris I of Morocco, son of the great-grandson of the caliph Ali and Fatima, daughter of the Islamic prophet Muhammad. He was probably born around 730 and died in 814, perhaps in Ain El Hout in the province of Tlemcen in Algeria.

According to Ibn Khaldoun, he reached Tlemcen after the assassination of his brother Idris I in 791 and took control of it. But according to Ibn Idhari and Al-Bakri, he would have settled in Tlemcen while his brother was alive and probably with his approval. This is the version retained by historians Philippe Sénac and Patrice Cressier who indicate that Sulaymān I was governor of Tlemcen between 786 and 813. However, according to other ancient Arab authors, he would not have escaped the massacre of Fakh and would have died in June 786.

He gives his name to the Sulaymanid dynasty in Algeria, being the father of Muḥammad who already governed the region in 806.

== Sources ==
- Baghli, Mohammed (22 August 2007). "Sidi Slimane Ibn Abdallah Al-Kamil de Aïn Al-Houtz". Le Quotidien d'Oran.
- Bekkaï, Allal (6 July 2009). "Tlemcen: Aïn El Hout, le village des Alaouites, revisité". Le Quotidien d'Oran.
- Eustache, Daniel (1970). "Sulaymānides". Corpus des dirhams idrīsites et contemporains : collection de la Banque du Maroc et autres collections mondiales, publiques et privées. Rabat: Banque du Maroc. OCLC 875887851.
- Ibn Khaldūn (1854). "Origine et chute de la dynastie des Idricides - Rétablissement de leur autorité dans plusieurs endroits du Maghreb". Histoire des Berbères et des dynasties musulmanes de l'Afrique Septentrionale - Tome 2. Alger: Impr. du Gouvernement. OCLC 313120435.
- Marçais, Georges (1941). "La Berbérie au IXe siècle d'après El-Ya'qoûbî". Revue Africaine. 85 (386–387). Alger: Office des publications universitaires: 40–61. Archived from the original on December 25, 2007.
- Sénac, Philippe; Cressier, Patrice (2012). "Point 6 - La ville de Tlemcen". Histoire du Maghreb médiéval: VIIe-XIe siècle. Paris: Armand Colin. ISBN 978-2-200-28342-1.
