= Isma'il ibn Yusuf =

9th century Hasanid Alid

Ismāʿīl ibn Yūsūfūʾl-Ukhayḍir ibn Ibrāhīm ibn Mūsā al-Jawn ibn ʿAbd Allāh al-Kāmīl ibn al-Ḥasan al-Muthannā ibn al-Ḥasan al-Mujtabā ibn ʿAlī ibn Abī Ṭālib was a Hasanid Alid who rose in revolt against the Abbasid Caliphate in the Hejaz in 865–866, during the Anarchy at Samarra. His grandfather Ibrāhīm was the grandson of Abd Allah al-Mahd, the grandson of Hasan ibn Ali.

The uprising began in Mecca in April 865, when Isma'il and his supporters forced the local Abbasid governor, Ja'far ibn al-Fadl ibn Isa ibn Musa, to flee the city. The resistance of the local garrison was overcome. Isma'il then proceeded to plunder the city, even removing the valuable objects from the Ka'aba and emptying the treasury of money and valuables, as well as extorting 200,000 gold dinars from the inhabitants. The motives for his rebellion are not clear, but may be connected to the renewed persecution of the Alids under the Abbasid caliphs from al-Mutawakkil's reign onward.

After fifty days he left for Medina, but although the governor of the latter made no attempt to resist and went into hiding, Isma'il returned to Mecca and laid siege to it. As the siege dragged on, famine spread in Mecca, and a lot of its inhabitants died; after 57 days, the Alid left Mecca and made for Jeddah. There he repeated his exactions, confiscating wealth, merchandise, and food.

In January 866, on the Day of Arafah, he attacked the Hajj pilgrims and their accompanying Abbasid military escort, sent by Caliph al-Mu'tazz. After killing some 1100 pilgrims, the rest fled into Mecca, and did not dare exit the city, while Isma'il returned to Jeddah unmolested. He died in March/April 866 of smallpox. Isma'il's brother Muhammad succeeded him, but in the event he was pushed by Abbasid forces into the Yamama region in central Arabia, where he founded the Ukhaydhir dynasty.

== Sources ==
- Landau-Tasseron, Ella (2010). "Arabia". In Robinson, Chase F. (ed.). The New Cambridge History of Islam, Volume 1: The Formation of the Islamic World, Sixth to Eleventh Centuries. Cambridge: Cambridge University Press. pp. 397–447. ISBN 978-0-521-83823-8.
- Madelung, W. (2000). "al-Uk̲h̲ayḍir". In Bearman, P. J.; Bianquis, Th.; Bosworth, C. E.; van Donzel, E. & Heinrichs, W. P. (eds.). The Encyclopaedia of Islam, Second Edition. Volume X: T–U. Leiden: E. J. Brill. p. 792. doi:10.1163/1573-3912_islam_SIM_7693. ISBN 978-90-04-11211-7.
- Saliba, George, ed. (1985). The History of al-Ṭabarī, Volume XXXV: The Crisis of the ʿAbbāsid Caliphate: The Caliphates of al-Mustaʿīn and al-Muʿtazz, A.D. 862–869/A.H. 248–255. SUNY Series in Near Eastern Studies. Albany, New York: State University of New York Press. ISBN 978-0-87395-883-7.
