= Ibn Tabataba =

Anti-Abbasid rebel leader (died 815)

Abū ʿAbdallāh Muḥammad ibn Ibrāhīm Ṭabāṭabā ibn Ismāʿīl al-Dībādj ibn Ibrāhīm al-Ghamr ibn al-Ḥasan al-Muthannā (Arabic: أبو عبد الله محمد بن إبراهيم بن إسماعيل الديباج بن إبراهيم الغمر بن الحسن المثنى, died 15 February 815), better known as Ibn Ṭabāṭabā, was a Hasanid who was the figurehead of an unsuccessful Zaydi uprising against the Abbasid Caliphate in 814–815, during the Fourth Fitna. His grandfather Ismāʿīl al-Dībāj is the grandson of Hasan al-Mu'thannā.

== Life ==
The sobriquet of Ṭabāṭabā was given either to his father, Ibrahim, or his grandfather, Isma'il, reportedly due to a speech defect or a slip-up. However, it was also a colloquial term for persons of Alid descent from both paternal and maternal sides. He lived at Medina, until he was sought out by Nasr ibn Shabath, who preferred him as candidate for imam. His ambition awakened, he followed Nasr to Iraq, but there he found Nasr's collaborators opposed to his candidacy. They offered him 5,000 gold dinars to return to Medina. He refused the money, but began his return to Medina.

On the way, he learned of a pro-Alid rebellion being prepared by Abu'l-Saraya, who was gathering his Zaydi followers around the tomb of al-Husayn. Immediately he went to Kufa, an Alid stronghold, where he only succeeded in rousing a few poorly armed Kufans to his cause. The two groups met at a suburb of Kufa on the appointed day, before entering the city. Abu'l-Saraya proclaimed Ibn Tabataba as commander of the faithful on 27 December 814 (26 January 815 according to al-Tabari), and declared the principles of the uprising in a Friday sermon.

Ibn Tabataba's role in the revolt was only as a figurehead, while actual power rested with Abu'l-Saraya. Indeed, modern scholars suggest that Abu'l-Saraya was not motivated by pro-Alid zeal, but merely saw the Alids as a tool to gain power.

The uprising was initially successful, and on 14 February 815, the rebels defeated the Abbasid troops that Caliph al-Ma'mun's governor of Iraq, al-Hasan ibn Sahl, had sent against them. Some accounts have Ibn Tabataba fighting and being wounded outside the walls of Kufa, while al-Tabari claims that Abu'l-Saraya poisoned him. On his deathbed, Ibn Tabataba nominated the Husaynid Ali ibn Ubayd Allah as his successor, but the latter refused and nominated Muhammad ibn Zayd instead. Ibn Tabataba died at Kufa on the next day, 15 February 815.

== Relatives ==
His descendants migrated to Kirman and Ethiopia, where their line disappears from record. His brother, al-Qasim al-Rassi, was the progenitor of the Rassid dynasty of Zaydi imams, who ruled large parts of Yemen until the 20th century.

== Sources ==
- Bosworth, C. E., ed. (1987). The History of al-Ṭabarī, Volume XXXII: The Reunification of the ʿAbbāsid Caliphate: The Caliphate of al-Maʾmūn, A.D. 813–33/A.H. 198–213. SUNY Series in Near Eastern Studies. Albany, New York: State University of New York Press. ISBN 978-0-88706-058-8.
- Madelung, W. (1995). "al-Rassī". In Bosworth, C. E.; van Donzel, E.; Heinrichs, W. P. & Lecomte, G. (eds.). The Encyclopaedia of Islam, Second Edition. Volume VIII: Ned–Sam. Leiden: E. J. Brill. pp. 453–454. doi:10.1163/1573-3912_islam_SIM_6247. ISBN 978-90-04-09834-3.
- Scarcia Amoretti, B. (1971). "Ibn Ṭabāṭabā". In Lewis, B.; Ménage, V. L.; Pellat, Ch. & Schacht, J. (eds.). The Encyclopaedia of Islam, Second Edition. Volume III: H–Iram. Leiden: E. J. Brill. pp. 950–951. doi:10.1163/1573-3912_islam_SIM_3387. OCLC 495469525.
