= Abd Allah al-Mahd =

8th-century Islamic scholar, theologian and hadith narrator

ʿAbd Allāh ibn al-Ḥasan ibn al-Ḥasan عبد الله بن الحسن بن الحسن
- Born: 689 CE; Medina
- Died: 762 CE; Kufa or Baghdad, Abbasid Caliphate (present-day Iraq)
- Spouses: Hind bint Abi Ubayda; Atika bint Abd al-Malik ibn al-Harith; Qurayba bint Rukayh
- Children: Ja'far; Muhammad; Ibrāhīm; Idris; Mūsā al-Jawn; Sulaymān; Zaynab; Yahya; ʿIsā
- Parents: Hasan al-Mu'thannā (father); Fatima bint al-Husayn (mother)
- Relatives: Hasan ibn Ali (grandfather); Husayn ibn Ali (grandfather); Muhammad ibn Abdallah al-Dibaj (half-brother)

Abū Muḥammad ʿAbd Allāh ibn al-Ḥasan ibn al-Ḥasan ibn ʿAlī ibn Abī Ṭālib al-Hāshimī al-Qurayshī (Arabic: أبو محمد عبد الله بن الحسن بن الحسن بن علي بن أبي طالب الهاشمي القریشي; c. 689 – 762, better known as ʿAbd Allāh al-Maḥḍ (Arabic: عبد الله المحض) and ʿAbd Allāh al-Kāmīl (Arabic: عبد الله الكامل), was an Islamic scholar, theologian and hadith narrator, grandson of both Hasan ibn Ali and Husayn ibn Ali (the grandsons of the Islamic prophet Muhammad). His sons include Muhammad and Ibrahim, who rebelled against Abbasid rule, and Idris, who rebelled in the Maghreb and established the Idrisid dynasty.

Considered a martyr among the Shi'as, Abd Allah was imprisoned on the orders of Al-Mansur after he refused to reveal the hiding place of his sons, and was assassinated three years later while in prison. His tomb in the city of al-Shinafiyah, Iraq, is today the famous shrine of Abd Allah Abu Najm.

== Life ==
Abd Allah was born in Medina c. 689. His father was Hasan al-Muthanna and his mother Fatima bint al-Husayn, both Ali's grandchildren. Abd Allah was the first child of the couple and was raised by his maternal uncle Ali ibn Husayn Zayn al-Abidin, who took charge of his education and instructed him theologically. According to the narrations of Abu al-Faraj al-Isfahani, Abd Allah had a great temper, aspired to exert control over Banu Hashim, and challenged Umar II. According to other Shi'a accounts, Abd Allah came to claim the imamate for himself and issued fatwas contrary to the imams.

After the Abbasids took control of the government, Abd Allah's sons refused to recognize the new authority, sparking a crackdown on them and their followers. The Abbasids pressured Abd Allah to show them his hideout, but he refused. The first caliph al-Saffah treated Abd Allah with respect and left him alone, but nevertheless when al-Mansur came to power he imprisoned Abd Allah accusing him of being an accomplice to the rebellion by refusing to collaborate in the capture of his sons, for which remained in jail for three years.

Some sources mention that Abd Allah was assassinated on the orders of al-Mansur in al-Hashimiyya prison, near Kufa in 762. Ibn al-Jawzi claimed that his death was on the day of al-Adha. Abd Allah has a major shrine in Al-Qadisiyah, 9 kilometres west of the city of al-Shinafiyah and 70 kilometres south of the city of Najaf. In Cairo, there is also a shrine to Abd Allah al-Mahd.

=== Children ===
Abd Allah al-Mahd's sons are famous for their roles in the revolutions of the time, among them Muhammad who rebelled against the Abbasids in Medina, which led to his death along with many of his followers. Ibrahim promoted a revolution in Basra after the murder of his brother and was supported by many Zaydis and Mu'tazilas. The revolution was unsuccessful and Ibrahim and many of his supporters were massacred in the Bakhmra region in an incident known as the Bakhmra martyrdom. Abd Allah al-Mahd's other sons, Idris, Yahya and Sulayman, participated in the revolution. Idris survived the battle and went to Morocco where he established the first Sharifian state. Yahya went to Persia and resided in Daylam where he attempted to recruit people for a new rebellion against the Abbasid state, but was defeated and imprisoned by order of Harun, dying of hunger, thirst or having been buried alive around 803.

== Abd Allah and the revolution ==
According to some sources, Abd Allah disagreed with Zayd's rebellion against the Umayyads, warning Zayd before his revolution in Kufa that he should not be fooled by the promises of the Kufans. After Zayd's death, he became convinced of the need to end Umayyad rule by force, so he prepared his sons for the revolution.

According to what was related by Abu al-Faraj al-Isfahani, some of Banu Hashim did not agree with him and told him: "Do not do that, because the time has not yet come. If you see that this son of yours is the Mahdi, then he is not with him and this is not his time." It was mentioned in the sources that the imam told Abd Allah that the caliphate would belong to al-Saffah and his brothers, and that Abd Allah and his sons would not have a share in it.

Abd Allah al-Mahd was imprisoned during the caliphate of al-Mansur, the second Abbasid caliph, for not revealing the hiding place of his son Muhammad. He stayed in prison for three years after that. Al-Mansur met him in his cell during the season of Hajj in 757, and asked him again to reveal his son's hiding place in exchange for his freedom, but he refused once more.
