= Muhammad al-Nafs al-Zakiyya =

Descendant of Muhammad and revolutionary leader (died 762)

- محمد النفس الزكية

Personal life
- Born: 100 AH ≈ 718-719 CE Medina, Hejaz
- Died: 145 AH ≈ CE 762 (aged 43–44)
- Resting place: Al-Baqi Cemetery, Medina, Saudi Arabia
- Spouse: Umm Salamah bint Muhammad ibn Hasan ibn Hasan ibn Ali; Fakhitah bint Fulayh ibn Muhammad ibn al-Mundhir ibn Zubayr ibn al-Awwam
- Children: Al-Qasim; Abdullah al-Ashtar; Ali; Al-Hasan; Al-Tahir; Ibrahim; Ahmad; Yahya; Musa; Muhammad al-Asghar; Fatima; Zaynab; Umm Kulthum; Umm Salamah; Umm Ali
- Parents: ʿAbd Allāh al-Kāmil ibn Ḥasan al-Mu'thannā (father); Hind bint Abi Ubayda (mother)

Religious life
- Religion: Islam

Abū ʿAbd Allāh Muḥammad ibn ʿAbd Allāh ibn al-Ḥasan al-Muthannā ibn al-Ḥasan al-Mujtabā ibn ʿAlī ibn Abī Ṭālib or Muḥammad al-Nafs al-Zakiyya (Arabic: أبو عبد الله محمد بن عبد الله بن الحسن بن الحسن بن علي الملقَّب النفس الزكية, lit. 'The Pure Soul'), was a descendant of the Islamic prophet Muhammad, through his daughter Fatimah. Known for his commanding oratory skills, amiable demeanor, and impressive build, he led the Alid Revolt in Medina, a failed rebellion, against the second Abbasid caliph Al-Mansur. He and a few hundred soldiers faced against a large Abbasid force under Isa ibn Musa, and he was killed on December 6, 762 CE (145 AH).

== Life ==
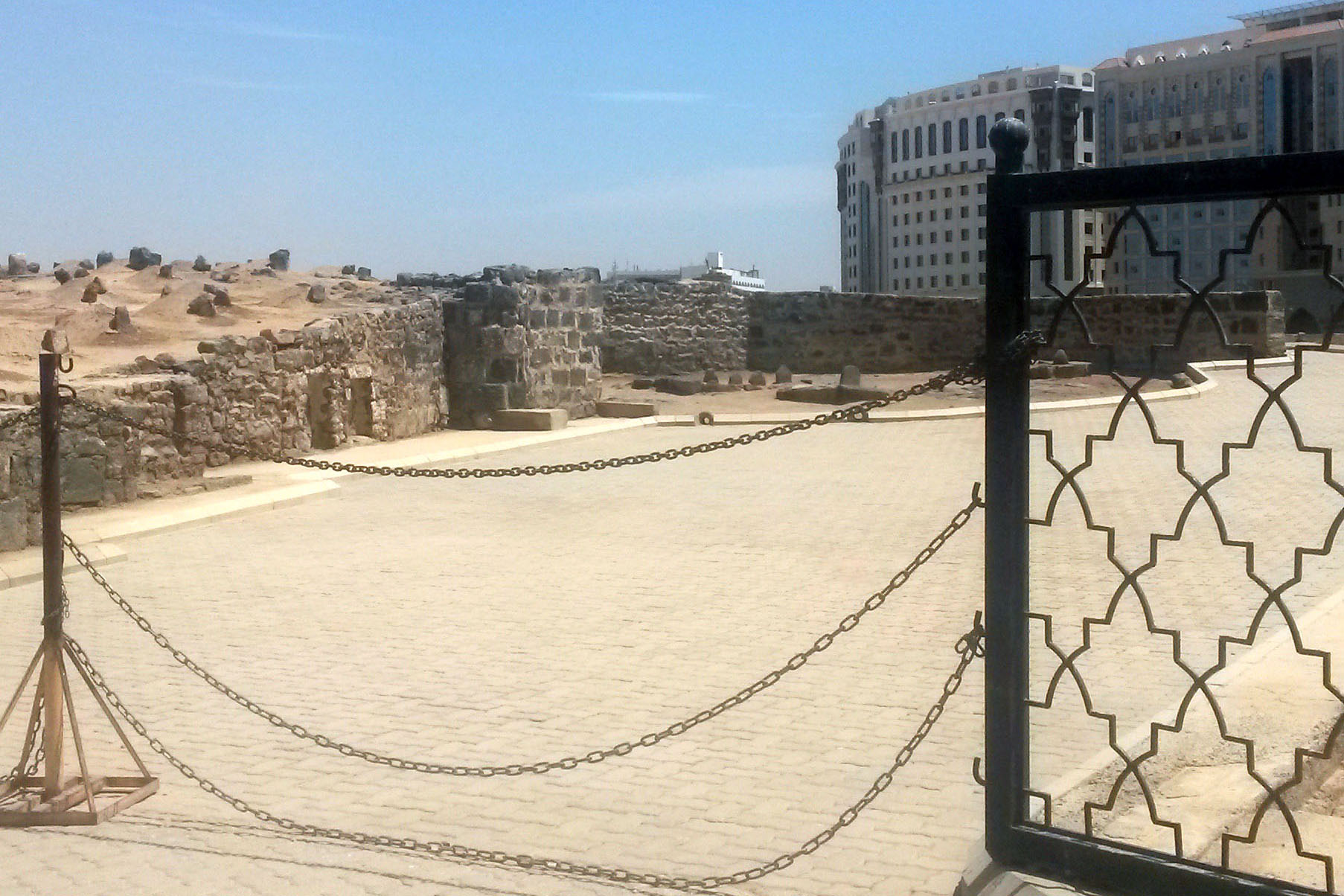
Al-Zakiyya's grave at the Al-Baqi Cemetery in Medina

Initially, he hoped to rebel against Umayyad rule, when the children of Hashim paid their allegiance to him at Abwa. Among them were Ibrahim al-Imam, As-Saffah and Al-Mansur. But it soon became clear that Abbasid rule was established, so those who had paid allegiance to him deserted him, and another group of Shiites flocked around him.

=== Personality ===
Muhammad was an inspirational figure to many throughout the caliphate who believed that he was destined for glory due to his ancestry. For years he disguised himself and travelled stealthily, since his professed relationship to the Prophet meant that he posed a threat to the established political order. He was eventually able to amass a sizable but ragtag army and seize the city of Medina. He then left Medina in the year 145 A.H and took over Mecca and Yemen. He was murdered in Medina a few months later.

=== Revolt in 762–763 ===
Medina was an exceptionally poor place for any large-scale insurrection due to its dependence on other provinces for goods, and his motley army of devotees were no match for the Caliph's imperial soldiers. Despite the advantage held by the Abbasid troops, Muhammad refused to step down in the hours before battle, utilising the historic trenches dug by the Prophet to fortify the city decades earlier.

== Ancestry ==
Ancestors of Muhammad al-Nafs al-Zakiyya

16. Ali ibn Abi Talib (= 20)
8. Hasan ibn Ali
17. Fatima bint Muhammad (= 21)
4. Hasan al-Muthanna
18. Manzur ibn Zaban
9. Khawla bint Manzur
19. Mulayka bint Sinan
2. Abd Allah al-Kamil
20. Ali ibn Abi Talib (= 16)
10. Husayn ibn Ali
21. Fatima bint Muhammad (= 17)
5. Fatima bint Husayn
22. Talha ibn Ubayd Allah
11. Umm Ishaq bint Talha
23. al-Jarba bint Qasama
1. Muhammad al-Nafs al-Zakiyya
24. Zama'a ibn al-Aswad
12. Abd Allah ibn Zama'a
25. Qurayba "the Elder" bint Abi Umayya
6. Abu Ubaydah ibn Abd Allah
26. Abu Salama ibn ʿAbd al-Asad
13. Zaynab bint Abi Salama
27. Umm Salama bint Abi Umayya
3. Hind bint Abi Ubaydah

== See also ==
- Abbasids
- Alids
- Abdullah Shah Ghazi, son of Muhammad
- Ja'far al-Sadiq
- Nafs-e-Zakiyyah (Pure Soul)
- Zaydism

Shia Islam titles
Preceded by Yahya ibn Zayd	8th Zaydi Imam; 718 – 762	Succeeded by Ibrahim ibn Abdallah
