= Ja'far ibn Abdallah al-Mansur =

Son of Abbasid caliph al-Mansur

Ja'far ibn Abdallah al-Mansur جعفر بن عبد الله المنصور

Governor of Mosul
- Tenure: 762 – 764
- Born: c. 742/43; Humayma, Bilad al-Sham (now Jordan)
- Died: c. 767
- Spouse: Salsal bint Atta
- Children: Zubaidah; Lubabah
Names
- Abu Zubaidah Ja'far ibn Abdallah al-Mansur
- Dynasty: Abbasid
- Father: al-Mansur
- Mother: Umm Musa Arwa bint Mansur al-Himyari
- Religion: Islam
- Military career
- Allegiance: Abbasid Caliphate
- Branch: Abbasid army

Ja'far ibn Abdallah al-Mansur (Arabic: جعفر بن عبد الله المنصور) was the elder son of second Abbasid caliph al-Mansur and elder brother of third Abbasid caliph al-Mahdi. As the elder son of al-Mansur, he was the candidate to the caliphal throne until his premature death.

== Life ==
Ja'far was the son of Abdallah ibn Muhammad al-Abbasi al-Hashimi (the future caliph al-Mansur) in 742/743. When Ja'far was eleven or twelve year old, his father became caliph.

His mother was Arwa. She was al-Mansur's first wife. Arwa also known as Umm Musa, whose lineage went back to the kings of Himyar. Her father was Mansur al-Himyari. She had a brother named Yazid.

Arwa had two sons, Muhammad (future Caliph al-Mahdi) and Ja'far. She died in 764. The two sons of Arwa, Ja'far and Muhammad were regarded as his heirs after the removal of Isa ibn Musa as heir. However, Ja'far died during his father al-Mansur's reign. His brother, Muhammad became sole candidate to the throne.

One of his al-Mansur's concubines was a Kurdish woman. She was the mother of al-Mansur's son Ja'far. Al-Mansur named this son after his elder son.

After Ja'far's death, his father took care of his young children. When his father, al-Mansur died. His brother caliph al-Mahdi took responsibility for his children. Al-Mahdi married his son and heir to Ja'far's daughter Zubaidah.

== Relatives ==
Ja'far was related to several powerful figures of Abbasid House. He was the older brother of al-Mahdi and he was also maternal grandfather of al-Amin.

Jafar also had several half-siblings, After his mother's death, his father remarried and had children from his wives.

No.	Abbasids	Relation
1	Al-Saffah	Uncle
2	Al-Mansur	Father
3	Al-Mahdi	Brother
4	Musa al-Hadi	Nephew
5	Harun al-Rashid	Nephew (Son-in-law)
6	Al-Amin	Maternal-grandson
7	Zubaidah	Daughter
8	Sulayman	Half-brother
9	Isa ibn al-Mansur	Half-brother
10	Ya'qub	Half-brother
11	Jafar ibn al-Mansur	Half-brother
12	Salih al-Miskin	Half-brother
13	Qasim	Half-brother
14	Aliyah	Half-sister

The genealogy of the Abbasids including their rival Zaydi imams

Abbasids

Caliphs of the Abbasid Caliphate
Caliphs of Cairo
Zaydi imams

ʿAbd al-Muṭṭalib ibn ʿHāshīm
ʾAbū Ṭālib ibn ʿAbd al-Muṭṭalib	Abū'l-Fādl al-ʿAbbās ibn ʿAbd al-Muṭṭalib	ʿAbd Allāh ibn ʿAbd al-Muṭṭalib
ʿAlīyyū'l-Murtaḍžā^{(1st Imām of Kaysāniyyā, Zaydīyyā, Imāmiyyā)}	Hibr al-Ummah ʿAbd Allāh ibn al-ʿAbbās	Khātam al-Nabiyyin; Abū'l-Qāsīm; Muḥammad ibn ʿAbd Allāh
Al-Ḥasan al-Mujtabā^{(2nd Imām of Kaysāniyyā, Zaydīyyā, Imāmiyyā)}	Hussayn ibn Ali^{(3rd Imām of Kaysāniyyā, Zaydīyyā, Imāmiyyā)}	Abū'l-Qāsīm Muḥammad al-Hānafīyya^{(4th Imām of Kaysāniyyā)}	ʿAlī ibn ʿAbd Allāh al-Sajjad
Al-Ḥasan al-Mu'thannā^{(5th Imām of Zaydiyyā)}	Ali al-Sajjad (Zayn al-ʿĀbidīn)^{(4th Imām of Zaydiyyā, Imāmiyyā)}	Abū Hāshīm ʿAbd Allāh ibn Muḥammad^{(5th Imām of Hāsheemīyyā)}	Muḥammad "al-Imām"^{(6th Imām of Hāsheemīyyā)} 716/7 - 743	ʿAbd Allāh ibn ʿAlī^{(Governor of Syria)} 750–754	Ṣāliḥ ibn ʿAlī^{(Governor of Egypt)} 750–751
ʿAbd Allāh al-Kāmīl ibn al-Ḥasan al-Mu'thannā	Zayd ibn Ali^{(6th Imām of Zaydiyyā)}	Ibrāhim (Ebrāheem) "al-Imām"^{(7th Imām of Hāsheemīyyā)} 743 - 749	Abū Jāʿfar ʿAbd Allāh al-Mānṣūr^{(2)} r. 754–775	Abū'l-ʿAbbās ʿAbd Allāh as-Saffāh^{(1)} r. 750–754	Mūsā ibn Muḥammad "al-Imām"
Nafsū'zZakiyya^{(First elected caliph by Ibrāhim, Mānṣūr, Saffāh, Imām Mālīk & Abū Ḥanīfa)}^{(8th Imām of Zaydiyyā)}	Yahya ibn Zayd^{(7th Imām of Zaydiyyā)}	Abū Muslīm al-Khurāsānī^{(Governor of Khurasan)} 748–755	Muḥammad al-Mahdī^{(3)} r. 775–785	Jāʿfar^{(Wali al-Ahd & Governor of Mosul)} 762–764	ʿĪsā ibn Mūsā^{(Governor of Kufa)} 750–765
ʿAbd Allāh; Shāh Ghāzī (ʿAbd Allāh ibn Muḥammad)^{(10th Imām of Zaydiyyā)}	Ibrāhīm ibn ʿAbd Allāh al-Kāmīl ibn al-Ḥasan al-Mu'thannā^{ibn Ḥasan al-Mujtabā}^{(9th Imām of Zaydiyyā)}	Al-Ḥusayn ibn ʿAlī al-ʿĀbid ibn al-Ḥasan al-Mu'thallath^{ibn Ḥasan al-Mu'thannā}^{(12th Imām of Zaydiyyā)}	Hārūn ar-Rāshīd^{(5)} r. 786–809	ʿMūsā al-Hādī^{(4)} r. 785–786	^{(The Governors)}: Mūsā ^{(Kufa, Egypt & Medina)}; Ismā'īl ^{(Egypt)}; Dā'wūd^{(Medina)}
Sulaymān^{ibn ʿAbd Allāh al-Kāmīl ibn al-Ḥasan II}^{(Emir of Tlemcen)}^{(Sulaymanid dynasty of Western Algeria)}	Yaḥyā^{ibn ʿAbd Allāh al-Kāmīl ibn al-Ḥasan al-Mu'thannā}^{(14th Imām of Zaydiyyā)}	Ibrāhīm Ṭabāṭabā^{ibn Ismāʿīl al-Dībādj ibn Ibrāhīm al-Ghamr ibn al-Ḥasan al-Mu'thannā}	Muḥammad al-Mu'tasim^{(8)} r. 833–842	Abd Allāh al-Ma'mun^{(7)} r. 813–833	Muḥammad al-Amin^{(6)} r. 809–813
Sūlaymān^{ibn ʿAbd Allāh as-Sālih ibn Mūsā al-Jawn ibn ʿAbd Allāh al-Kāmīl ibn al-Ḥasan al-Mu'thannā}	Idrīs the Elder ibn ʿAbd Allāh^{(Idrisid dynasty of Morocco)}^{(15th Imām of Zaydiyyā)}	Muḥammad ibn IbrāhīmṬabāṭabā^{(16th Imām of Zaydiyyā)}	Jāʿfar al-Mutawakkil^{(10)} r. 847–861	Muḥammad ibn Muḥammad al-Mu'tasim	Hārūn al-Wathiq^{(9)} r. 842–847
Mūsā II^{ibn ʿAbd Allāh as-Sâlih ibn Mūsā al-Jawn ibn ʿAbd Allāh al-Kāmīl}	Idrīs ibn Idrīs^{(2nd Zaydī Imām of Idrisids in Morocco)}	Muḥammad al-Muntasir^{(11)} r. 861–862	Ṭalḥa al-Muwaffaq^{(Regent)} 870–891	Aḥmad al-Musta'in^{(12)} r. 862–866	Muḥammad al-Muhtadi^{(14)} r. 869–870
Ismāʿīl ibn Yūsūf; Al-Ukhayḍhir^{ibn Ibrāhīm ibn Mūsā al-Jawn ibn ʿAbd Allāh al-Kāmīl ibn Ḥasan al-Mu'thannā}	Al-Qāsīm ar-Rassī ibn IbrāhīmṬabāṭabā^{(19th Imām of Zaydiyyā)}	Ibrahim al-Mu'ayyad^{(Wali al-Ahd & Governor of Syria)} 850–861	Aḥmad al-Mu'tadid^{(16)} r. 892–902	Muḥammad al-Mu'tazz^{(13)} r. 866–869	Aḥmad al-Mu'tamid^{(15)} r. 870–892
Muḥammad ibn Yūsūf; Al-Ukhayḍhir^{(1st Zaydī Imām of Ukhaydhirites in Najd and Al-Yamama)}	^{Abūʾl-Ḥusayn; Al-Hādī ilāʾl-Ḥaqq} Yaḥyā ibn al-Ḥusayn^{(1st Zaydī Imām of Rassids in Yemen)}	ʿAlī al-Muktafī^{(17)} r. 902–908	Jāʿfar al-Muqtadir^{(18)} r. 908–929, 929–932	Muḥammad al-Qāhir^{(19)} r. 929, 932–934	Jāʿfar al-Mufawwid^{(Wali al-Ahd)} 875–892
Zayd ibn al-Ḥasan al-Mujtabā ibn ʿAlī ibn Abī Ṭālib	ʿAbd Allāh al-Mustakfī^{(22)} r. 944–946	Al-Faḍl al-Mutīʿ^{(23)} r. 946–974	Ishāq ibn Jāʿfar al-Muqtadir	Muḥammad al-Rādī^{(20)} r. 934–940	Ībrāhīm al-Muttaqī^{(21)} r. 940–944
Ḥasan ibn Zayd ibn al-Ḥasan al-Mujtabā ibn ʿAlīyyū'l-Murtaḍžā	ʿUmar al-Ashraf ibn ʿAlī Zayn al-ʿĀbidīn ibn al-Ḥusayn	ʿAbd al-Karīm al-Ṭāʾiʿ^{(24)} r. 974–991	Aḥmad al-Qāʿdīr^{(25)} r. 991–1031
Ismāʿīl ibn Ḥasan ibn Zayd ibn al-Ḥasan al-Mujtabā	ʿAlī ibn ʿUmar al-Ashraf ibn ʿAlī Zayn al-ʿĀbidīn	Al-Ḥusayn Dhu'l-Dam'a ibn Zayd ibn ʿAlī Zayn al-ʿĀbidīn	ʿAbd Allāh al-Qāʿīm^{(26)} r. 1031–1075
Muḥammad ibn Ismāʿīl ibn Ḥasan ibn Zayd	Al-Ḥasan ibn ʿAlī ibn ʿUmar al-Ashraf	Yaḥyā ibn al-Ḥusayn Dhu'l-Dam'a ibn Zayd	Muḥammad Dhakīrat ad-Dīn^{(Wali al-Ahd)} 1039–1056
Zayd ibn Muḥammad ibn Ismāʿīl ibn Ḥasan	ʿAlī ibn al-Ḥasan ibn ʿAlī ibn ʿUmar al-Ashraf	ʿUmar ibn Yaḥyā ibn al-Ḥusayn Dhu'l-Dam'a	ʿAbd Allāh al-Mūqtādī^{(27)} r. 1075–1094
^{Al-Dāʿī al-Kabīr} Hasan ibn Zayd^{(1st Zaydī Imām of Zaydīds in Tabaristan)}	^{Al-Dāʿī al-Ṣaghīr} Muhammad ibn Zayd^{(2nd Zaydī Imām of Zaydīds in Tabaristan)}	Yaḥyā ibn ʿUmar^{(20th Imām of Zaydiyyā in Samarra)}	Aḥmad al-Mūstāzhīr^{(28)} r. 1094–1118
^{Al-Nāṣir liʾl-Ḥāqq} Hasan al-Utrush^{(3rd Zaydī Imām of Zaydīds in Tabaristan)}	Al-Faḍl al-Mūstārshīd^{(29)} r. 1118–1135
Al-Mānṣūr al-Rāshīd^{(30)} r. 1135–1136
Muḥammad al-Mūqtāfī^{(31)} r. 1136–1160	Alī ibn al-Faḍl al-Qabī
Yūsuf al-Mūstānjīd^{(32)} r. 1160–1170	al-Hāsān ibn Alī
Al-Hāssān al-Mūstādī'^{(33)} r. 1170–1180	Abū Bakr ibn al-Hāsān
Aḥmad al-Nāsīr^{(34)} r. 1180–1225	Abi 'Alī al-Hāsān ibn Abū Bakr
Muḥammad az-Zāhīr^{(35)} r. 1225–1226	Malīka'zZāhīr Rūkn ad-Dīn Baybars^{(Mamluk Sultanate Sultan of Egypt)} r. 1260–1277
Al-Mānsūr al-Mūstānsīr^{(36)} r. 1226–1242	Abū'l-Qāsim Aḥmad al-Mūstānsīr^{(1)} r. 1261	Abū'l-ʿAbbās Aḥmad al-Hakim I^{(2)} r. 1262–1302
ʿAbd Allāh al-Mūstā'sīm^{(37)} r. 1242–1258	Abū'r-Rabīʿ Sulaymān al-Mustakfī I^{(3)} r. 1302–1340	Aḥmad ibn Aḥmad al-Ḥākim bi-amr Allāh
Abū'l-ʿAbbās Aḥmad al-Hakim II^{(5)} r. 1341–1352	Abū'l-Fatḥ Abū Bakr al-Mu'tadid I^{(6)} r. 1352–1362	Abū Isḥāq Ibrāhīm al-Wāṯiq I^{(4)} r. 1340–1341
Abū ʿAbd Allāh Muḥammad al-Mutawakkil I^{(7)} r. 1362–1377, 1377–1383, 1389–1406	Abū Yāḥyā Zakariyāʾ al-Musta'sim^{(8)} r. 1377, 1386–1389	Abū Ḥafs ʿUmar al-Wāṯiq II^{(9)} r. 1383–1386
Abū'l-Faḍl al-ʿAbbās al-Musta'īn^{(10)} r. 1406–1414; Sultan of Egypt r. 1412	Abū'l-Fatḥ Dāwud al-Mu'tadīd II^{(11)} r. 1414–1441	Abū'r-Rabīʿ Sulaymān al-Mustakfī II^{(12)} r. 1441–1451	Yaʿqūb ibn Muḥammad al-Mutawakkil ʿalā'Llāh	Abū'l-Baqāʾ Ḥamza al-Qāʾim^{(13)} r. 1451–1455	Abū'l-Maḥāsin Yūsuf al-Mustanjid^{(14)} r. 1455–1479
Abū'l-ʿIzz ʿAbd al-ʿAzīz al-Mutawakkil II^{(15)} r. 1479–1497
Abū'ṣ-Ṣabr Yaʿqūb al-Mustamsik^{(16)} r. 1497–1508, 1516–1517
Muḥammad al-Mutawakkil III^{(17)} r. 1508–1516, 1517

Preceded by Malik ibn al-Haytham al-Khuzai (759–762)	Governor of Mosul; 762–764	Succeeded by Khalid ibn Barmak (764–766)
