= Ibrahim ibn Abdallah =

Leader of revolt against Abbasid Caliphate (716–763)

Ibrahim ibn Abd Allah ibn al-Hasan
- إبراهيم بن عبد الله بن الحسن

Personal life
- Born: 97 AH ≈ 716 CE Medina, Hejaz
- Died: 145 AH ≈ 763 CE Basra, Iraq.
- Spouse: Umamah bint Ismah
- Children: Ali bin Ibrahim (Son of an concubine); Hasan bin Ibrahim (Son of Umamah)
- Parents: Abd Allah al-Mahd (father); Hind bint Abi Ubayda (mother)

Religious life
- Religion: Islam

Ibrahim ibn Abd Allah ibn al-Hasan (Arabic: إبراهيم بن عبد الله بن الحسن, romanized: Ibrāhīm ibn ʿAbd Allāh ibn al-Ḥasan; 97 AH - 145 AH / 716 AD - 763 AD) was an Arab leader, from the lineage of the Prophet's family and from the narrators. He is often mentioned in conjunction with the name of his brother, Imam Muhammad al-Nafs al-Zakiyya the Pure Soul. This association is due to their participation in the ordeal and the revolution against Abbasid rule. Therefore, it is remarkably frequent in Islamic sources that they are mentioned together when speaking about rebellion against al-Mansur. He was also a poet and a scholar of Arab history and poetry.

== Biography ==
Ibrahim was the son of the Hasanid Abd Allah al-Mahd and Hind bint Abi Ubayda, a well-known poet who had previously been married to a son of the Umayyad Caliph Abd al-Malik ibn Marwan. During the caliphate of Abu l-Abbas as-Saffah, he remained in hiding with his brother Muhammad al-Nafs al-Zakiyya, who aspired to the caliphate. The two brothers behaved in the same way when Al-Mansur assumed the caliphate in June 754. Al-Mansur feared the two brothers because of their political ambitions and searched for them everywhere. In order to get hold of her, from 758 onwards he had several of her relatives, including her father and uncle, imprisoned and mistreated in custody. Meanwhile, Muhammad and Ibrahim traveled around the Arabian Peninsula and gathered followers around them, but without appearing openly anywhere.

On September 22, 762, Muhammad finally appeared in front of Medina and took the city in a surprise attack. A relative, al-Hasan ibn Muʿāwiya, was sent to Mecca as governor and was also able to quickly take control of this city and win the residents over to Muhammad's side. Meanwhile, Ibrahim stayed near Basra and took the city on November 23, 762 with the support of the local governor, who sympathized with the uprising movement. He then sent armed troops to occupy other towns in the area (al-Ahwāz, al-Wāsit, various towns in Fārs). Together with his followers, Ibrahim moved towards Kufa to take the weakly fortified city.

Ibrahim also enjoyed the support of many Iraqi hadith and fiqh scholars in his rebellion. Among those who took his side are the traditionalist al-A'mash and the jurist Abu Hanifa. The latter is said to have corresponded with him and announced financial support of 4,000 dirhams. Another well-known supporter of his uprising was the philologist Al-Mufaddal ad-Dabbi (d. between 781 and 787). He is said to have given Ibrahim temporary shelter before his uprising. After Muhammad an-Nafs az-Zakīya fell in battle against the Abbasid military leader Isa ibn Musa on December 6, 762, his brother's followers also swore an oath of loyalty to him.

The caliph, who was busy with construction work on his new capital Baghdad at the time the uprising broke out, had troops come from Syria and the Jazeera region to fend off the uprising movement, and called on his military commander Isa ibn Musa after the uprising had been suppressed in Medina to immediately go to Iraq with his troops. When Ibrahim heard that Isa ibn Musa was approaching, he gave up the plan of occupying Kufa against the advice of his followers and went to meet Isa ibn Musa. The two armies met on January 21, 763 in Bāchamrā south of Kufa. Ibrahim's troops were initially able to deal a heavy blow to the Abbasid advance guard, but were scattered in the ensuing battles. Ibrahim remained in Bāchamrā with a few followers and seriously wounded. There he died of his wounds on February 14, 763.

Al-Mansūr subsequently took harsh action against some learned supporters of Ibrahim's rebellion. So he had Abu Hanifa taken to Baghdad and thrown into prison, where he died a short time later, allegedly poisoned by the Caliph. The philologist al-Mufaddal ad-Dabbī was also imprisoned, but was soon pardoned by the caliph.

The revolt of the two brothers Muhammad al-Nafs al-Zakiyya and Ibrahim in 762/763 was one of the most important political events of the early Abbasid period, so that later various scholars such as Ma'mar ibn al-Muthanna and Umar ibn Shabba created his own collections of reports about it. Although these books themselves have been lost, detailed excerpts from them have been preserved in the Al-Tabari's books and the book Tālibid Fights (“Battles of the Talibids”) by Abu al-Faraj al-Isfahani. These two works represent the most important sources for the rebellions of the two brothers. A third brother, Idris, later emigrated to the western Maghreb and founded the Idrisid state there in 789 with the support of local Berber tribes, which lasted until the beginning of the 10th century extended over large areas of what is now Morocco.

The comparative genealogy of the Abbasid caliphs with their rival Zaydi imams

Abbasids

Caliphs of the Abbasid Caliphate
Caliphs of Cairo
Zaydi imams

ʿAbd al-Muṭṭalib ibn ʿHāshīm
ʾAbū Ṭālib ibn ʿAbd al-Muṭṭalib | Abū'l-Fādl al-ʿAbbās ibn ʿAbd al-Muṭṭalib | ʿAbd Allāh ibn ʿAbd al-Muṭṭalib
ʿAlīyyū'l-Murtaḍžā^{(1st Imām of Kaysāniyyā, Zaydīyyā, Imāmiyyā)} | Hibr al-Ummah ʿAbd Allāh ibn al-ʿAbbās | Khātam al-Nabiyyin; Abū'l-Qāsīm; Muḥammad ibn ʿAbd Allāh
Al-Ḥasan al-Mujtabā^{(2nd Imām of Kaysāniyyā, Zaydīyyā, Imāmiyyā)} | Hussayn ibn Ali^{(3rd Imām of Kaysāniyyā, Zaydīyyā, Imāmiyyā)} | Abū'l-Qāsīm Muḥammad al-Hānafīyya^{(4th Imām of Kaysāniyyā)} | ʿAlī ibn ʿAbd Allāh al-Sajjad
Al-Ḥasan al-Mu'thannā^{(5th Imām of Zaydiyyā)} | Ali al-Sajjad (Zayn al-ʿĀbidīn)^{(4th Imām of Zaydiyyā, Imāmiyyā)} | Abū Hāshīm ʿAbd Allāh ibn Muḥammad^{(5th Imām of Hāsheemīyyā)} | Muḥammad "al-Imām"^{(6th Imām of Hāsheemīyyā)} 716/7 - 743 | ʿAbd Allāh ibn ʿAlī^{(Governor of Syria)} 750–754 | Ṣāliḥ ibn ʿAlī^{(Governor of Egypt)} 750–751
ʿAbd Allāh al-Kāmīl ibn al-Ḥasan al-Mu'thannā | Zayd ibn Ali^{(6th Imām of Zaydiyyā)} | Ibrāhim (Ebrāheem) "al-Imām"^{(7th Imām of Hāsheemīyyā)} 743 - 749 | Abū Jāʿfar ʿAbd Allāh al-Mānṣūr^{(2)} r. 754–775 | Abū'l-ʿAbbās ʿAbd Allāh as-Saffāh^{(1)} r. 750–754 | Mūsā ibn Muḥammad "al-Imām"
Nafsū'zZakiyya^{(First elected caliph by Ibrāhim, Mānṣūr, Saffāh, Imām Mālīk & Abū Ḥanīfa)}^{(8th Imām of Zaydiyyā)} | Yahya ibn Zayd^{(7th Imām of Zaydiyyā)} | Abū Muslīm al-Khurāsānī^{(Governor of Khurasan)} 748–755 | Muḥammad al-Mahdī^{(3)} r. 775–785 | Jāʿfar^{(Wali al-Ahd & Governor of Mosul)} 762–764 | ʿĪsā ibn Mūsā^{(Governor of Kufa)} 750–765
ʿAbd Allāh; Shāh Ghāzī (ʿAbd Allāh ibn Muḥammad)^{(10th Imām of Zaydiyyā)} | Ibrāhīm ibn ʿAbd Allāh al-Kāmīl ibn al-Ḥasan al-Mu'thannā^{ibn Ḥasan al-Mujtabā}^{(9th Imām of Zaydiyyā)} | Al-Ḥusayn ibn ʿAlī al-ʿĀbid ibn al-Ḥasan al-Mu'thallath^{ibn Ḥasan al-Mu'thannā}^{(12th Imām of Zaydiyyā)} | Hārūn ar-Rāshīd^{(5)} r. 786–809 | ʿMūsā al-Hādī^{(4)} r. 785–786 | ^{(The Governors)}: Mūsā ^{(Kufa, Egypt & Medina)}; Ismā'īl ^{(Egypt)}; Dā'wūd^{(Medina)}
Sulaymān^{ibn ʿAbd Allāh al-Kāmīl ibn al-Ḥasan II}^{(Emir of Tlemcen)}^{(Sulaymanid dynasty of Western Algeria)} | Yaḥyā^{ibn ʿAbd Allāh al-Kāmīl ibn al-Ḥasan al-Mu'thannā}^{(14th Imām of Zaydiyyā)} | Ibrāhīm Ṭabāṭabā^{ibn Ismāʿīl al-Dībādj ibn Ibrāhīm al-Ghamr ibn al-Ḥasan al-Mu'thannā} | Muḥammad al-Mu'tasim^{(8)} r. 833–842 | Abd Allāh al-Ma'mun^{(7)} r. 813–833 | Muḥammad al-Amin^{(6)} r. 809–813
Sūlaymān^{ibn ʿAbd Allāh as-Sālih ibn Mūsā al-Jawn ibn ʿAbd Allāh al-Kāmīl ibn al-Ḥasan al-Mu'thannā} | Idrīs the Elder ibn ʿAbd Allāh^{(Idrisid dynasty of Morocco)}^{(15th Imām of Zaydiyyā)} | Muḥammad ibn IbrāhīmṬabāṭabā^{(16th Imām of Zaydiyyā)} | Jāʿfar al-Mutawakkil^{(10)} r. 847–861 | Muḥammad ibn Muḥammad al-Mu'tasim | Hārūn al-Wathiq^{(9)} r. 842–847
Mūsā II^{ibn ʿAbd Allāh as-Sâlih ibn Mūsā al-Jawn ibn ʿAbd Allāh al-Kāmīl} | Idrīs ibn Idrīs^{(2nd Zaydī Imām of Idrisids in Morocco)} | Muḥammad al-Muntasir^{(11)} r. 861–862 | Ṭalḥa al-Muwaffaq^{(Regent)} 870–891 | Aḥmad al-Musta'in^{(12)} r. 862–866 | Muḥammad al-Muhtadi^{(14)} r. 869–870
Ismāʿīl ibn Yūsūf; Al-Ukhayḍhir^{ibn Ibrāhīm ibn Mūsā al-Jawn ibn ʿAbd Allāh al-Kāmīl ibn Ḥasan al-Mu'thannā} | Al-Qāsīm ar-Rassī ibn IbrāhīmṬabāṭabā^{(19th Imām of Zaydiyyā)} | Ibrahim al-Mu'ayyad^{(Wali al-Ahd & Governor of Syria)} 850–861 | Aḥmad al-Mu'tadid^{(16)} r. 892–902 | Muḥammad al-Mu'tazz^{(13)} r. 866–869 | Aḥmad al-Mu'tamid^{(15)} r. 870–892
Muḥammad ibn Yūsūf; Al-Ukhayḍhir^{(1st Zaydī Imām of Ukhaydhirites in Najd and Al-Yamama)} | ^{Abūʾl-Ḥusayn; Al-Hādī ilāʾl-Ḥaqq} Yaḥyā ibn al-Ḥusayn^{(1st Zaydī Imām of Rassids in Yemen)} | ʿAlī al-Muktafī^{(17)} r. 902–908 | Jāʿfar al-Muqtadir^{(18)} r. 908–929, 929–932 | Muḥammad al-Qāhir^{(19)} r. 929, 932–934 | Jāʿfar al-Mufawwid^{(Wali al-Ahd)} 875–892
Zayd ibn al-Ḥasan al-Mujtabā ibn ʿAlī ibn Abī Ṭālib | ʿAbd Allāh al-Mustakfī^{(22)} r. 944–946 | Al-Faḍl al-Mutīʿ^{(23)} r. 946–974 | Ishāq ibn Jāʿfar al-Muqtadir | Muḥammad al-Rādī^{(20)} r. 934–940 | Ībrāhīm al-Muttaqī^{(21)} r. 940–944
Ḥasan ibn Zayd ibn al-Ḥasan al-Mujtabā ibn ʿAlīyyū'l-Murtaḍžā | ʿUmar al-Ashraf ibn ʿAlī Zayn al-ʿĀbidīn ibn al-Ḥusayn | ʿAbd al-Karīm al-Ṭāʾiʿ^{(24)} r. 974–991 | Aḥmad al-Qāʿdīr^{(25)} r. 991–1031
Ismāʿīl ibn Ḥasan ibn Zayd ibn al-Ḥasan al-Mujtabā | ʿAlī ibn ʿUmar al-Ashraf ibn ʿAlī Zayn al-ʿĀbidīn | Al-Ḥusayn Dhu'l-Dam'a ibn Zayd ibn ʿAlī Zayn al-ʿĀbidīn | ʿAbd Allāh al-Qāʿīm^{(26)} r. 1031–1075
Muḥammad ibn Ismāʿīl ibn Ḥasan ibn Zayd | Al-Ḥasan ibn ʿAlī ibn ʿUmar al-Ashraf | Yaḥyā ibn al-Ḥusayn Dhu'l-Dam'a ibn Zayd | Muḥammad Dhakīrat ad-Dīn^{(Wali al-Ahd)} 1039–1056
Zayd ibn Muḥammad ibn Ismāʿīl ibn Ḥasan | ʿAlī ibn al-Ḥasan ibn ʿAlī ibn ʿUmar al-Ashraf | ʿUmar ibn Yaḥyā ibn al-Ḥusayn Dhu'l-Dam'a | ʿAbd Allāh al-Mūqtādī^{(27)} r. 1075–1094
^{Al-Dāʿī al-Kabīr} Hasan ibn Zayd^{(1st Zaydī Imām of Zaydīds in Tabaristan)} | ^{Al-Dāʿī al-Ṣaghīr} Muhammad ibn Zayd^{(2nd Zaydī Imām of Zaydīds in Tabaristan)} | Yaḥyā ibn ʿUmar^{(20th Imām of Zaydiyyā in Samarra)} | Aḥmad al-Mūstāzhīr^{(28)} r. 1094–1118
^{Al-Nāṣir liʾl-Ḥāqq} Hasan al-Utrush^{(3rd Zaydī Imām of Zaydīds in Tabaristan)} | Al-Faḍl al-Mūstārshīd^{(29)} r. 1118–1135
Al-Mānṣūr al-Rāshīd^{(30)} r. 1135–1136
Muḥammad al-Mūqtāfī^{(31)} r. 1136–1160 | Alī ibn al-Faḍl al-Qabī
Yūsuf al-Mūstānjīd^{(32)} r. 1160–1170 | al-Hāsān ibn Alī
Al-Hāssān al-Mūstādī'^{(33)} r. 1170–1180 | Abū Bakr ibn al-Hāsān
Aḥmad al-Nāsīr^{(34)} r. 1180–1225 | Abi 'Alī al-Hāsān ibn Abū Bakr
Muḥammad az-Zāhīr^{(35)} r. 1225–1226 | Malīka'zZāhīr Rūkn ad-Dīn Baybars^{(Mamluk Sultanate Sultan of Egypt)} r. 1260–1277
Al-Mānsūr al-Mūstānsīr^{(36)} r. 1226–1242 | Abū'l-Qāsim Aḥmad al-Mūstānsīr^{(1)} r. 1261 | Abū'l-ʿAbbās Aḥmad al-Hakim I^{(2)} r. 1262–1302
ʿAbd Allāh al-Mūstā'sīm^{(37)} r. 1242–1258 | Abū'r-Rabīʿ Sulaymān al-Mustakfī I^{(3)} r. 1302–1340 | Aḥmad ibn Aḥmad al-Ḥākim bi-amr Allāh
Abū'l-ʿAbbās Aḥmad al-Hakim II^{(5)} r. 1341–1352 | Abū'l-Fatḥ Abū Bakr al-Mu'tadid I^{(6)} r. 1352–1362 | Abū Isḥāq Ibrāhīm al-Wāṯiq I^{(4)} r. 1340–1341
Abū ʿAbd Allāh Muḥammad al-Mutawakkil I^{(7)} r. 1362–1377, 1377–1383, 1389–1406 | Abū Yāḥyā Zakariyāʾ al-Musta'sim^{(8)} r. 1377, 1386–1389 | Abū Ḥafs ʿUmar al-Wāṯiq II^{(9)} r. 1383–1386
Abū'l-Faḍl al-ʿAbbās al-Musta'īn^{(10)} r. 1406–1414; Sultan of Egypt r. 1412 | Abū'l-Fatḥ Dāwud al-Mu'tadīd II^{(11)} r. 1414–1441 | Abū'r-Rabīʿ Sulaymān al-Mustakfī II^{(12)} r. 1441–1451 | Yaʿqūb ibn Muḥammad al-Mutawakkil ʿalā'Llāh | Abū'l-Baqāʾ Ḥamza al-Qāʾim^{(13)} r. 1451–1455 | Abū'l-Maḥāsin Yūsuf al-Mustanjid^{(14)} r. 1455–1479
Abū'l-ʿIzz ʿAbd al-ʿAzīz al-Mutawakkil II^{(15)} r. 1479–1497
Abū'ṣ-Ṣabr Yaʿqūb al-Mustamsik^{(16)} r. 1497–1508, 1516–1517
Muḥammad al-Mutawakkil III^{(17)} r. 1508–1516, 1517
