= Muhammad ibn al-Mu'tasim =

9th-century Abbasid prince and father of Al-Musta'in

Muhammad ibn al-Mu'tasim محمد ابن المعتصم
- Born: 820s Baghdad, Abbasid Caliphate
- Died: 850s Samarra, Abbasid Caliphate
- Burial: Samarra
- Spouse: Makhariq
- Issue: Ahmad al-Musta'in
Names
- Muḥammad ibn Muhammad al-Mu'tasim ibn Hārūn al-Rāshīd
- Dynasty: Abbasid
- Father: al-Mu'tasim
- Mother: Qaratis
- Religion: Islam
- Occupation: Courtier and confidant of caliph al-Wathiq

Muḥammad ibn al-Mu'tasim (Arabic: محمد ابن المعتصم, romanized: Muḥammad ibn al-Muʿtaṣim) was an Abbasid prince, the son of Caliph al-Mu'tasim. He was a contemporary of the caliph al-Wathiq and al-Mutawakkil. His son Ahmad became the twelfth Abbasid caliph as al-Musta'in. Muhammad was the first prince in Abbasid history whose son became a caliph; no other Abbasid prince before him had this prestige.

== Background ==
Muhammad was the son of Abū Isḥaq Muhammad. He was a member of the influential Abbasid house that had been ruling the Caliphate since 750. His full name was Muhammad ibn Muhammad ibn Harun al-Rashid and his kunya was Abu Ahmad. His father, al-Mu'tasim's parents were the fifth Abbasīd caliph, Harun al-Rashid (r. 786–809), and Maridah bint Shabib, concubine. Muhammad was born during his uncle's reign.

His uncle, al-Ma'mun had made no official provisions for his succession. Al-Ma'mun's son, al-Abbas was old enough to rule and had acquired experience of command in the border wars with the Byzantines, but had not been named heir. According to the account of al-Tabari, on his deathbed al-Ma'mun dictated a letter nominating his brother, rather than al-Abbas, as his successor, and Abu Ishaq was acclaimed as caliph on 9 August, with the regnal title of al-Mu'tasim (in full al-Muʿtaṣim bi’llāh, "he who seeks refuge in God"). His father became the eighth Abbasid caliph of the Caliphate.

== Biography ==
Family tree of the Abbasid caliphs of the ninth century. Muhammad son of al-Mu'tasim is shown in a white box on the right side of the family tree

Muhammad was the son of caliph al-Mu'tasim (r. 833–842) from one of his concubine (Umm walad). He spent his childhood in Baghdad. As an Abbasid prince, he received a good education along with his other brothers. When his father became Caliph, the wealth of Muhammad and his brothers increased. In 836, his father founded the new city Samarra and moved the capital of the Caliphate there; Muhammad also moved to Samarra. His father ruled the Empire for almost eight years until his death. His elder brother al-Wathiq became caliph after his father's death on 5 January 842. He ascended smoothly to the throne without any opposition from his brothers, including Muhammad. Six years later, al-Wathiq died as a result of an edema, while being seated in an oven in an attempt to cure it, on 10 August 847. Muhammad was a courtier and a patron of scholars during his reign. He was succeeded by al-Mutawakkil. The life of Muhammad under him is obscure, as he played no important role in political affairs.

His brother, Al-Mutawakkil saw Muhammad as a potential successor (future caliph) because of his popularity to prevent Muhammad from succession, His brother caliph al-Mutawakkil (r. 847–861) had created a plan of succession that would allow his sons to inherit the caliphate after his death; he would be succeeded first by his eldest son, al-Muntasir, then by al-Mu'tazz and third by al-Mu'ayyad. This nomination of his three sons as heirs prevented all his brothers from succession, especially Muhammad and Ahmad.

Muhammad ibn al-Mu'tasim had several children from different concubines; one of them was Ahmad. Ahmad (future al-Musta'in) was born in 836 to a concubine from Sicily called Makhariq, also known as Umm Ahmad. Muhammad died during the reign of his brother al-Mutawakkil. Even though he was sidelined from succession, his popularity didn't die. His son became caliph in mid 862.

=== Contribution to accession of al-Musta'in to Caliphate ===
Just few years after death of Muhammad. In December 861, al-Mutawakkil was assassinated by a group of Turkic military officers, likely with the support of al-Muntasir. During al-Muntasir's short reign (r. 861–862), the Turks pressured him into removing al-Mu'tazz and al-Mu'ayyad from the succession. When al-Muntasir died, the Turkic officers gathered together and decided to install the dead caliph's cousin al-Musta'in on the throne. Muhammad's connection with the caliphal court, his relation with al-Wathiq and his popularity among officers of Turkic regiment became his major contribution to Al-Musta'in's career.

The genealogy of the Abbasids including their rival Zaydi imams

Abbasids

Caliphs of the Abbasid Caliphate
Caliphs of Cairo
Zaydi imams

ʿAbd al-Muṭṭalib ibn ʿHāshīm
ʾAbū Ṭālib ibn ʿAbd al-Muṭṭalib | Abū'l-Fādl al-ʿAbbās ibn ʿAbd al-Muṭṭalib | ʿAbd Allāh ibn ʿAbd al-Muṭṭalib
ʿAlīyyū'l-Murtaḍžā^{(1st Imām of Kaysāniyyā, Zaydīyyā, Imāmiyyā)} | Hibr al-Ummah ʿAbd Allāh ibn al-ʿAbbās | Khātam al-Nabiyyin; Abū'l-Qāsīm; Muḥammad ibn ʿAbd Allāh
Al-Ḥasan al-Mujtabā^{(2nd Imām of Kaysāniyyā, Zaydīyyā, Imāmiyyā)} | Hussayn ibn Ali^{(3rd Imām of Kaysāniyyā, Zaydīyyā, Imāmiyyā)} | Abū'l-Qāsīm Muḥammad al-Hānafīyya^{(4th Imām of Kaysāniyyā)} | ʿAlī ibn ʿAbd Allāh al-Sajjad
Al-Ḥasan al-Mu'thannā^{(5th Imām of Zaydiyyā)} | Ali al-Sajjad (Zayn al-ʿĀbidīn)^{(4th Imām of Zaydiyyā, Imāmiyyā)} | Abū Hāshīm ʿAbd Allāh ibn Muḥammad^{(5th Imām of Hāsheemīyyā)} | Muḥammad "al-Imām"^{(6th Imām of Hāsheemīyyā)} 716/7 - 743 | ʿAbd Allāh ibn ʿAlī^{(Governor of Syria)} 750–754 | Ṣāliḥ ibn ʿAlī^{(Governor of Egypt)} 750–751
ʿAbd Allāh al-Kāmīl ibn al-Ḥasan al-Mu'thannā | Zayd ibn Ali^{(6th Imām of Zaydiyyā)} | Ibrāhim (Ebrāheem) "al-Imām"^{(7th Imām of Hāsheemīyyā)} 743 - 749 | Abū Jāʿfar ʿAbd Allāh al-Mānṣūr^{(2)} r. 754–775 | Abū'l-ʿAbbās ʿAbd Allāh as-Saffāh^{(1)} r. 750–754 | Mūsā ibn Muḥammad "al-Imām"
Nafsū'zZakiyya^{(First elected caliph by Ibrāhim, Mānṣūr, Saffāh, Imām Mālīk & Abū Ḥanīfa)}^{(8th Imām of Zaydiyyā)} | Yahya ibn Zayd^{(7th Imām of Zaydiyyā)} | Abū Muslīm al-Khurāsānī^{(Governor of Khurasan)} 748–755 | Muḥammad al-Mahdī^{(3)} r. 775–785 | Jāʿfar^{(Wali al-Ahd & Governor of Mosul)} 762–764 | ʿĪsā ibn Mūsā^{(Governor of Kufa)} 750–765
ʿAbd Allāh; Shāh Ghāzī (ʿAbd Allāh ibn Muḥammad)^{(10th Imām of Zaydiyyā)} | Ibrāhīm ibn ʿAbd Allāh al-Kāmīl ibn al-Ḥasan al-Mu'thannā^{ibn Ḥasan al-Mujtabā}^{(9th Imām of Zaydiyyā)} | Al-Ḥusayn ibn ʿAlī al-ʿĀbid ibn al-Ḥasan al-Mu'thallath^{ibn Ḥasan al-Mu'thannā}^{(12th Imām of Zaydiyyā)} | Hārūn ar-Rāshīd^{(5)} r. 786–809 | ʿMūsā al-Hādī^{(4)} r. 785–786 | ^{(The Governors)}: Mūsā ^{(Kufa, Egypt & Medina)}; Ismā'īl ^{(Egypt)}; Dā'wūd^{(Medina)}
Sulaymān^{ibn ʿAbd Allāh al-Kāmīl ibn al-Ḥasan II}^{(Emir of Tlemcen)}^{(Sulaymanid dynasty of Western Algeria)} | Yaḥyā^{ibn ʿAbd Allāh al-Kāmīl ibn al-Ḥasan al-Mu'thannā}^{(14th Imām of Zaydiyyā)} | Ibrāhīm Ṭabāṭabā^{ibn Ismāʿīl al-Dībādj ibn Ibrāhīm al-Ghamr ibn al-Ḥasan al-Mu'thannā} | Muḥammad al-Mu'tasim^{(8)} r. 833–842 | Abd Allāh al-Ma'mun^{(7)} r. 813–833 | Muḥammad al-Amin^{(6)} r. 809–813
Sūlaymān^{ibn ʿAbd Allāh as-Sālih ibn Mūsā al-Jawn ibn ʿAbd Allāh al-Kāmīl ibn al-Ḥasan al-Mu'thannā} | Idrīs the Elder ibn ʿAbd Allāh^{(Idrisid dynasty of Morocco)}^{(15th Imām of Zaydiyyā)} | Muḥammad ibn IbrāhīmṬabāṭabā^{(16th Imām of Zaydiyyā)} | Jāʿfar al-Mutawakkil^{(10)} r. 847–861 | Muḥammad ibn Muḥammad al-Mu'tasim | Hārūn al-Wathiq^{(9)} r. 842–847
Mūsā II^{ibn ʿAbd Allāh as-Sâlih ibn Mūsā al-Jawn ibn ʿAbd Allāh al-Kāmīl} | Idrīs ibn Idrīs^{(2nd Zaydī Imām of Idrisids in Morocco)} | Muḥammad al-Muntasir^{(11)} r. 861–862 | Ṭalḥa al-Muwaffaq^{(Regent)} 870–891 | Aḥmad al-Musta'in^{(12)} r. 862–866 | Muḥammad al-Muhtadi^{(14)} r. 869–870
Ismāʿīl ibn Yūsūf; Al-Ukhayḍhir^{ibn Ibrāhīm ibn Mūsā al-Jawn ibn ʿAbd Allāh al-Kāmīl ibn Ḥasan al-Mu'thannā} | Al-Qāsīm ar-Rassī ibn IbrāhīmṬabāṭabā^{(19th Imām of Zaydiyyā)} | Ibrahim al-Mu'ayyad^{(Wali al-Ahd & Governor of Syria)} 850–861 | Aḥmad al-Mu'tadid^{(16)} r. 892–902 | Muḥammad al-Mu'tazz^{(13)} r. 866–869 | Aḥmad al-Mu'tamid^{(15)} r. 870–892
Muḥammad ibn Yūsūf; Al-Ukhayḍhir^{(1st Zaydī Imām of Ukhaydhirites in Najd and Al-Yamama)} | ^{Abūʾl-Ḥusayn; Al-Hādī ilāʾl-Ḥaqq} Yaḥyā ibn al-Ḥusayn^{(1st Zaydī Imām of Rassids in Yemen)} | ʿAlī al-Muktafī^{(17)} r. 902–908 | Jāʿfar al-Muqtadir^{(18)} r. 908–929, 929–932 | Muḥammad al-Qāhir^{(19)} r. 929, 932–934 | Jāʿfar al-Mufawwid^{(Wali al-Ahd)} 875–892
Zayd ibn al-Ḥasan al-Mujtabā ibn ʿAlī ibn Abī Ṭālib | ʿAbd Allāh al-Mustakfī^{(22)} r. 944–946 | Al-Faḍl al-Mutīʿ^{(23)} r. 946–974 | Ishāq ibn Jāʿfar al-Muqtadir | Muḥammad al-Rādī^{(20)} r. 934–940 | Ībrāhīm al-Muttaqī^{(21)} r. 940–944
Ḥasan ibn Zayd ibn al-Ḥasan al-Mujtabā ibn ʿAlīyyū'l-Murtaḍžā | ʿUmar al-Ashraf ibn ʿAlī Zayn al-ʿĀbidīn ibn al-Ḥusayn | ʿAbd al-Karīm al-Ṭāʾiʿ^{(24)} r. 974–991 | Aḥmad al-Qāʿdīr^{(25)} r. 991–1031
Ismāʿīl ibn Ḥasan ibn Zayd ibn al-Ḥasan al-Mujtabā | ʿAlī ibn ʿUmar al-Ashraf ibn ʿAlī Zayn al-ʿĀbidīn | Al-Ḥusayn Dhu'l-Dam'a ibn Zayd ibn ʿAlī Zayn al-ʿĀbidīn | ʿAbd Allāh al-Qāʿīm^{(26)} r. 1031–1075
Muḥammad ibn Ismāʿīl ibn Ḥasan ibn Zayd | Al-Ḥasan ibn ʿAlī ibn ʿUmar al-Ashraf | Yaḥyā ibn al-Ḥusayn Dhu'l-Dam'a ibn Zayd | Muḥammad Dhakīrat ad-Dīn^{(Wali al-Ahd)} 1039–1056
Zayd ibn Muḥammad ibn Ismāʿīl ibn Ḥasan | ʿAlī ibn al-Ḥasan ibn ʿAlī ibn ʿUmar al-Ashraf | ʿUmar ibn Yaḥyā ibn al-Ḥusayn Dhu'l-Dam'a | ʿAbd Allāh al-Mūqtādī^{(27)} r. 1075–1094
^{Al-Dāʿī al-Kabīr} Hasan ibn Zayd^{(1st Zaydī Imām of Zaydīds in Tabaristan)} | ^{Al-Dāʿī al-Ṣaghīr} Muhammad ibn Zayd^{(2nd Zaydī Imām of Zaydīds in Tabaristan)} | Yaḥyā ibn ʿUmar^{(20th Imām of Zaydiyyā in Samarra)} | Aḥmad al-Mūstāzhīr^{(28)} r. 1094–1118
^{Al-Nāṣir liʾl-Ḥāqq} Hasan al-Utrush^{(3rd Zaydī Imām of Zaydīds in Tabaristan)} | Al-Faḍl al-Mūstārshīd^{(29)} r. 1118–1135
Al-Mānṣūr al-Rāshīd^{(30)} r. 1135–1136
Muḥammad al-Mūqtāfī^{(31)} r. 1136–1160 | Alī ibn al-Faḍl al-Qabī
Yūsuf al-Mūstānjīd^{(32)} r. 1160–1170 | al-Hāsān ibn Alī
Al-Hāssān al-Mūstādī'^{(33)} r. 1170–1180 | Abū Bakr ibn al-Hāsān
Aḥmad al-Nāsīr^{(34)} r. 1180–1225 | Abi 'Alī al-Hāsān ibn Abū Bakr
Muḥammad az-Zāhīr^{(35)} r. 1225–1226 | Malīka'zZāhīr Rūkn ad-Dīn Baybars^{(Mamluk Sultanate Sultan of Egypt)} r. 1260–1277
Al-Mānsūr al-Mūstānsīr^{(36)} r. 1226–1242 | Abū'l-Qāsim Aḥmad al-Mūstānsīr^{(1)} r. 1261 | Abū'l-ʿAbbās Aḥmad al-Hakim I^{(2)} r. 1262–1302
ʿAbd Allāh al-Mūstā'sīm^{(37)} r. 1242–1258 | Abū'r-Rabīʿ Sulaymān al-Mustakfī I^{(3)} r. 1302–1340 | Aḥmad ibn Aḥmad al-Ḥākim bi-amr Allāh
Abū'l-ʿAbbās Aḥmad al-Hakim II^{(5)} r. 1341–1352 | Abū'l-Fatḥ Abū Bakr al-Mu'tadid I^{(6)} r. 1352–1362 | Abū Isḥāq Ibrāhīm al-Wāṯiq I^{(4)} r. 1340–1341
Abū ʿAbd Allāh Muḥammad al-Mutawakkil I^{(7)} r. 1362–1377, 1377–1383, 1389–1406 | Abū Yāḥyā Zakariyāʾ al-Musta'sim^{(8)} r. 1377, 1386–1389 | Abū Ḥafs ʿUmar al-Wāṯiq II^{(9)} r. 1383–1386
Abū'l-Faḍl al-ʿAbbās al-Musta'īn^{(10)} r. 1406–1414; Sultan of Egypt r. 1412 | Abū'l-Fatḥ Dāwud al-Mu'tadīd II^{(11)} r. 1414–1441 | Abū'r-Rabīʿ Sulaymān al-Mustakfī II^{(12)} r. 1441–1451 | Yaʿqūb ibn Muḥammad al-Mutawakkil ʿalā'Llāh | Abū'l-Baqāʾ Ḥamza al-Qāʾim^{(13)} r. 1451–1455 | Abū'l-Maḥāsin Yūsuf al-Mustanjid^{(14)} r. 1455–1479
Abū'l-ʿIzz ʿAbd al-ʿAzīz al-Mutawakkil II^{(15)} r. 1479–1497
Abū'ṣ-Ṣabr Yaʿqūb al-Mustamsik^{(16)} r. 1497–1508, 1516–1517
Muḥammad al-Mutawakkil III^{(17)} r. 1508–1516, 1517

== Sources ==
- Bosworth, C. E., ed. (1987). The History of al-Ṭabarī, Volume XXXII: The Reunification of the ʿAbbāsid Caliphate: The Caliphate of al-Maʾmūn, A.D. 813–33/A.H. 198–213. SUNY Series in Near Eastern Studies. Albany, New York: State University of New York Press. ISBN 978-0-88706-058-8.
- Bosworth, C. E., ed. (1991). The History of al-Ṭabarī, Volume XXXIII: Storm and Stress Along the Northern Frontiers of the ʿAbbāsid Caliphate: The Caliphate of al-Muʿtasim, A.D. 833–842/A.H. 218–227. SUNY Series in Near Eastern Studies. Albany, New York: State University of New York Press. ISBN 978-0-7914-0493-5.
- Bosworth, C.E. (1993). "Al-Muntasir". In Bosworth, C. E.; van Donzel, E.; Heinrichs, W. P. & Pellat, Ch. (eds.). The Encyclopaedia of Islam, Second Edition. Volume VII: Mif–Naz. Leiden: E. J. Brill. ISBN 978-90-04-09419-2.
- Kennedy, Hugh (2006). When Baghdad Ruled the Muslim World: The Rise and Fall of Islam's Greatest Dynasty. Cambridge, MA: Da Capo Press. ISBN 978-0-306814808.
- Masudi (2010) [1989]. The Meadows of Gold: The Abbasids. Translated by Paul Lunde and Caroline Stone. London and New York: Routledge. ISBN 978-0-7103-0246-5.
