= Abbasid dynasty =

Rulers of the Abbasid Caliphate

Abbasid dynasty العباسيون
- Parent family: Banu Hashim
- Country: Abbasid Caliphate
- Founded: 750; 1276 years ago (in Baghdad); 1261; 765 years ago (in Cairo) (Note: After the fall of Baghdad to the Mongols in 1258, a surviving line of the Abbasid dynasty resided in Cairo and served as nominal caliphs with a ceremonial role under the Mamluk sultans.)
- Final ruler: Al-Musta'sim (in Baghdad); Al-Mutawakkil III (in Cairo)
- Historic seat: Kufa; Baghdad; Samarra; Cairo
- Titles: Caliph (Amir al-Mu'minin)
- Dissolution: 1258; 768 years ago (in Baghdad); 1517; 509 years ago (in Cairo)

The Abbasid dynasty, or Abbasids, (Arabic: بنو العباس, romanized: Banu al-ʿAbbās) was an Arab dynasty that ruled the third Islamic caliphate between 750 and 1258. They were from the Banu Hashim clan of Quraysh, tracing their descent from Abbas ibn Abd al-Muttalib. A cadet branch of the dynasty also ruled as ceremonial rulers for the Mamluk Sultanate (1261–1517) until their conquest by the Ottoman Empire.

== Ancestry ==
The Abbasids descended from Muhammad's uncle Abbas ibn Abd al-Muttalib (566–653 CE), from whom the dynasty takes its name. His son, Ibn Abbas, was an early Qur'an scholar. Their roots trace back to Hashim ibn Abd Manaf and Adnan.

== History ==
=== Early Abbasid era (750–861) ===
The Abbasid dynasty ruled the third caliphate to succeed the Islamic prophet Muhammad. The first caliph, al-Saffah, ruled from Kufa after the Umayyad dynasty was overthrown in the Abbasid revolution in 750. His brother and successor, al-Mansur, founded the city of Baghdad as a new capital near the ancient city of Babylon over the ruins of the ancient Sassanid capital of Ctesiphon. Under caliphs Harun al-Rashid and al-Ma'mun, Baghdad became the center of science, culture and innovation, housing several key academic institutions like the House of Wisdom, in what became known as the Golden Age of Islam.

The Abbasid leadership had to work hard in the last half of the 8th century (750–800) under several competent caliphs and their viziers to usher in the administrative changes needed to keep order of the political challenges created by the far-flung nature of the empire and limited communication across it. It was during this early period, in particular during the governance of al-Mansur, Harun al-Rashid, and al-Ma'mun, that its reputation and power were created. Al-Ma'mun's successor, Al-Mu'tasim, was a powerful military leader and his reign saw the rise of his Turkic corps in political and military positions. He also founded Samarra as a new capital and garrisoned his Turkic troops there. Under his son al-Mutawakkil, the Abbasid caliphate reached its territorial height.

=== Middle Abbasid era (861–936) ===
==== Assassination of al-Mutawakkil ====
Al-Mutawakkil had appointed his oldest son, al-Muntasir, as his heir in 849/50, but slowly had shifted his favour to his second son, al-Mu'tazz, encouraged by al-Fath ibn Khaqan and the vizier Ubayd Allah ibn Yahya ibn Khaqan. This rivalry extended into the political sphere, as al-Mu'tazz's succession appears to have been backed by the traditional Abbasid elites as well, while al-Muntasir was backed by the Turkic and Maghariba guard troops.

In late autumn 861, matters came to a head: in October, al-Mutawakkil ordered the estates of the Turkic general Wasif to be confiscated and handed over to al-Fath. Feeling backed into a corner, the Turkic leadership began a plot to assassinate the Caliph. They were soon joined, or at least had the tacit approval, of al-Muntasir, who smarted from a succession of humiliations: on 5 December, on the recommendation of al-Fath and Ubayd Allah, he was bypassed in favour of al-Mu'tazz for leading the Friday prayer at the end of Ramadan, while three days later, when al-Mutawakkil was feeling ill and chose al-Muntasir to represent him on the prayer, once again Ubayd Allah intervened and persuaded the Caliph to go in person. Even worse, according to al-Tabari, on the next day al-Mutawakkil alternately vilified and threatened to kill his eldest son, and even had al-Fath slap him on the face. With rumours circulating that Wasif and the other Turkish leaders would be rounded up and executed on 12 December, the conspirators decided to act.

According to al-Tabari, a story later circulated that al-Fath and Ubayd Allah were forewarned of the plot by a Turkic woman, but had disregarded it, confident that no-one would dare carry it out. On the night of 10/11 December, about one hour after midnight, the Turks burst into the chamber where the Caliph and al-Fath were having supper. Al-Fath was killed trying to protect the Caliph, who was killed next. Al-Muntasir, who now assumed the Caliphate, initially claimed that al-Fath had murdered his father, and that he had been killed after; within a short time, however, the official story changed to al-Mutawakkil choking on his drink. The murder of al-Mutawakkil began the tumultuous period known as "Anarchy at Samarra", which lasted until 870 and brought the Abbasid Caliphate to the brink of collapse.

==== Decline of Abbasid Caliphate ====
The decline of the Abbasids started with the death of al-Mutawakkil. After his assassination, the Anarchy at Samarra began. This was a period of extreme internal instability marked by the violent succession of four caliphs from 861 to 870.

Al-Muntasir became Caliph on 11 December 861, after his father al-Mutawakkil was assassinated by members of his Turkic guard. Although he was suspected of being involved in the plot to kill al-Mutawakkil, he was able to quickly take control of affairs in Samarra and receive the oath of allegiance from the leading men of the state. Al-Muntasir's sudden elevation to the Caliphate served to benefit several of his close associates, who gained senior positions in the government after his ascension. Included among these were his secretary, Ahmad ibn al-Khasib, who became vizier, and Wasif, a senior Turkic general who had likely been heavily involved in al-Mutawakkil's murder. His reign lasted less than half a year; it ended with his death from unknown causes on Sunday, 7 June 862, at the age of 24 years.

During al-Muntasir's short reign (r. 861–862), the Turks pressured him into removing al-Mu'tazz and al-Mu'ayyad from the succession. When al-Muntasir died, the Turkic officers gathered together and decided to install the dead caliph's cousin al-Musta'in (son of al-Mutawakkil's brother Muhammad) on the throne. The new caliph was almost immediately faced with a large riot in Samarra in support of the disenfranchised al-Mu'tazz; the rioters were put down by the military but casualties on both sides were heavy. Al-Musta'in, worried that al-Mu'tazz or al-Mu'ayyad could press their claims to the caliphate, first attempted to buy them off and then threw them in prison.

In 866 his nephew al-Musta'in was killed by al-Mu'tazz after Fifth Fitna. Al-Mu'tazz's reign marks the apogee of the decline of the Caliphate's central authority, and the climax of centrifugal tendencies, expressed through the emergence of the autonomous dynasties in Abbasid Caliphate. Finally, unable to meet the financial demands of the Turkic troops, in mid-July a palace coup deposed al-Mu'tazz. He was imprisoned and maltreated to such an extent that he died after three days, on 16 July 869. He was succeeded by his cousin al-Muhtadi. He ruled until 870, until he was murdered on 21 June 870, and replaced by his cousin, al-Mu'tamid (r. 870–892).

==== Abbasids from al-Mu'tadid to al-Radi ====
In a series of campaigns al-Mu'tadid recovered the provinces of Jazira, Thughur, and Jibal, and effected a rapprochement with the Saffarids in the east and the Tulunids in the west that secured their—albeit largely nominal—recognition of caliphal suzerainty. These successes came at the cost of gearing the economy almost exclusively towards the maintenance of the army, which resulted in the expansion and rise to power of the fiscal bureaucracy and contributed to the Caliph's reputation for avarice. Al-Mu'tadid was renowned for his cruelty when punishing criminals, and subsequent chroniclers recorded his extensive and ingenious use of torture. His reign saw the permanent move of the capital back to Baghdad, where he engaged in major building activities.

Al-Mu'tadid had taken care to prepare his son and successor, al-Muktafi, for his role by appointing him as governor in Rayy and the Jazira. Although al-Muktafi tried to follow his father's policies, he lacked his energy. The heavily militarized system of al-Muwaffaq and al-Mu'tadid required the Caliph to actively participate in campaigns, setting a personal example and forming ties of loyalty, reinforced by patronage, between the ruler and the soldiers. Al-Muktafi, on the other hand, did not "in his character and comportment [...], being a sedentary figure, instill much loyalty, let alone inspiration, in the soldiers". The Caliphate was still able to secure major successes over the next few years, including the reincorporation of the Tulunid domains in 904 and victories over the Qarmatians, but with al-Muktafi's death in 908, the so-called "Abbasid restoration" passed its high-water mark, and a new period of crisis began.

After al-Muktafi's death, al-Muqtadir came to the throne. He came to the throne at the age of 13, the youngest Caliph in Abbasid history. Al-Muqtadir's long reign (908–932) had brought the Abbasids to their lowest ebb, in which most of Northern Africa was lost. Mosul had thrown off its dependence and the Byzantine Empire could make raids at pleasure along the poorly protected borders. Yet in the East formal recognition of the Caliphate remained in place, even by those who virtually claimed their independence; and nearer home, the Qarmathians had been for the time put down.

After Al-Muqtadir's death, al-Qahir came to power in 932. He ruled for two years until he was pressured to abdicate in favour of Al-Muqtadir's nominated heir al-Radi (r. 932–940). When he refused to abdicate, he was blinded and cast into prison. According to al-Mas'udi, al-Radi "kept news of him hidden" so that he vanished from common knowledge. He was not freed until eleven years later, when al-Mustakfi (r. 944–946) came to the throne and discovered him locked away in a remote room in the palace.

Al-Radi's reign marked the end of the Caliph's political power and the rise of military strongmen, who competed for the title of Amir al-umara. Al-Radi is commonly spoken of as the last of the real Caliphs: the last to deliver orations at the Friday service, hold assemblies with philosophers to discuss the questions of the day, take counsel on the affairs of State, distribute largess among the needy, or interpose to temper the severity of cruel officers.

=== Later Abbasid era (936–1258) ===
Al-Muttaqi and his successors were all considered as later Abbasids. Al-Muti was a weak figure, for all intents and purposes a puppet ruler of the Buyid emir, first Mu'izz al-Dawla, and then his son, Izz al-Dawla (r. 967–978). As a result of his lack of real power, al-Muti' himself barely figures in the chronicles of his reign, which is considered as the lowest ebb of the Abbasid Caliphate. He was succeeded by his son al-Ta'i, who made attempts to restore his political authority until he was replaced with his cousin al-Qadir by Baha al-Dawla. In his long reign, al-Qadir was successful in restoring his political authority in Baghdad and its surrounding territory.

During the reign of his son al-Qa'im, the Buyids were ousted from Baghdad by the Seljuks, who replaced the former as the overlords of the Abbasid caliphs. The Seljuk influence over Abbasids continued until the reign of al-Muqtafi. His grandson al-Nasir, continued the dynasty's revival during his long reign, and is considered the last effective Abbasid caliph. This revival was short-lived as in 1258, the Mongols conquered and sacked Baghdad, and executed the last caliph, al-Musta'sim.

=== Caliphate of Cairo ===
The Mamluk Sultans of Egypt and Syria later appointed an Abbasid prince as Caliph of Cairo, but these Mamluk Abbasid Caliphs were marginalized and merely symbolic, with no temporal power and little religious influence. The Cairo Abbasids were largely ceremonial Caliphs under the patronage of the Mamluk Sultanate that existed after the takeover of the Ayyubids. Even though they kept the title for about 250 years more, other than installing the Sultan in ceremonies, these Caliphs had little importance. After the Ottomans conquered Egypt in 1517, the Caliph of Cairo, al-Mutawakkil III was transported to Constantinople.

Centuries later, a tradition developed saying that, at this time, al-Mutawakkil III formally surrendered the title of caliph as well as its outward emblems—the sword and mantle of Muhammad—to the Ottoman Sultan Selim I, establishing the Ottoman sultans as the new caliphal line. Some historians have noted that this story does not appear in the literature until the 1780s, suggesting that it was advanced to bolster the claims of caliphal jurisdiction over Muslims outside the empire, as asserted in the 1774 Treaty of Küçük Kaynarca.

== List of caliphs ==
=== Abbasid caliphs (750–1258) ===
1. as-Saffah, great-grandson of al-Abbas ibn Abd al-Muttalib, 750–754
2. al-Mansur, brother of as-Saffah, 754–775
3. al-Mahdi, son of al-Mansur, 775–785
4. al-Hadi, son of al-Mahdi, 785–786
5. al-Rashid, son of al-Mahdi, 786–809
6. al-Amin, son of al-Rashid, 809–813
7. al-Ma'mun, son of al-Rashid, 813–833
8. al-Mu'tasim, son of al-Rashid, 833–842
9. al-Wathiq, son of al-Mu'tasim, 842–847
10. al-Mutawakkil, son of al-Mu'tasim, 847–861
11. al-Muntasir, son of al-Mutawakkil, 861–862
12. al-Musta'in, son of Muhammad ibn al-Mu'tasim, 862–866
13. al-Mu'tazz, son of al-Mutawakkil, 866–869
14. al-Muhtadi, son of al-Wathiq, 869–870
15. al-Mu'tamid, son of al-Mutawakkil, 870–892
16. al-Mu'tadid, son of al-Muwaffaq, 892–902
17. al-Muktafi, son of al-Mu'tadid, 902–908
18. al-Muqtadir, son of al-Mu'tadid, 908–932
19. al-Qahir, son of al-Mu'tadid, 932–934
20. ar-Radi, son of al-Muqtadir, 934–940
21. al-Muttaqi, son of al-Muqtadir, 940–944
22. al-Mustakfi, son of al-Muktafi, 944–946
23. al-Muti, son of al-Muqtadir, 946–974
24. at-Ta'i, son of al-Muti, 974–991
25. al-Qadir, son of Ishaq ibn al-Muqtadir, 991–1031
26. al-Qa'im, son of al-Qadir, 1031–1075
27. al-Muqtadi, son of Muhammad ibn al-Qa'im, 1075–1094
28. al-Mustazhir, son of al-Muqtadi, 1094–1118
29. al-Mustarshid, son of al-Mustazhir, 1118–1135
30. ar-Rashid, son of al-Mustarshid, 1135–1136
31. al-Muqtafi, son of al-Mustazhir, 1136–1160
32. al-Mustanjid, son of al-Muqtafi, 1160–1170
33. al-Mustadi, son of al-Mustanjid, 1170–1180
34. an-Nasir, son of al-Mustadi, 1180–1225
35. az-Zahir, son of an-Nasir, 1225–1226
36. al-Mustansir, son of az-Zahir, 1226–1242
37. al-Musta'sim, son of al-Mustansir, 1242–1258

=== Caliphs of Cairo (1261–1517) ===
1. al-Mustansir II, uncle of al-Musta'sim, 1261
2. al-Hakim I, descendant of al-Mustarshid, 1262–1302
3. al-Mustakfi I, son of al-Hakim I, 1302–1340
4. al-Wathiq I, son of Ahmad ibn al-Hakim I, 1340–1341
5. al-Hakim II, son of al-Mustakfi I, 1341–1352
6. al-Mu'tadid I, son of al-Mustakfi I, 1352–1362
7. al-Mutawakkil I, son of al-Mu'tadid I, 1362–1377, 1377–1383, 1389–1406
8. al-Wathiq II, son of al-Wathiq I, 1383–1386
9. al-Musta'sim, son of al-Wathiq I, 1377, 1386–1389
10. al-Musta'in, son of al-Mutawakkil I, 1406–1414
11. al-Mu'tadid II, son of al-Mutawakkil I, 1414–1441
12. al-Mustakfi II, son of al-Mutawakkil I, 1441–1451
13. al-Qa'im, son of al-Mutawakkil I, 1451–1455
14. al-Mustanjid, son of al-Mutawakkil I, 1455–1479
15. al-Mutawakkil II, son of Ya'qub ibn al-Mutawakkil I, 1479–1497
16. al-Mustamsik, son of al-Mutawakkil II, 1497-1508, 1516–1517
17. al-Mutawakkil III, son of al-Mustamsik, 1508–1516, 1517

== Dynasties of Abbasid descent ==
The rulers of the Kurdish emirate of Bahdinan, in present-day northern Iraq, reportedly claimed descent from the Abbasid caliphs. The emirate was established by an individual by the name of Malik Khalil al-Abbasi in 1339. The family remained in power under various circumstances until the 19th century, when the area was officially annexed to an Ottoman provincial administration.

The rulers of the Wadai Empire claimed descent from the Abbasids in some traditions. They claimed descent from a man by the name of Salih ibn Abd Allah ibn Abbas, whose father Abd Allah was an Abbasid prince who fled Baghdad for the Hijaz upon the Mongol invasion. He had a son named Salih who was invited to Sennar by some Muslim ulama while on pilgrimage in Mecca. He is said to have continued to Wadai, where he converted the local people to Islam, after which they made him sultan, laying the foundations of the Wadai Empire.

== See also ==
- Abbasid caliphs
- Abbasid art
- Abbasid architecture
- Abbasid harem
- Dhund tribe
- Ja'alin tribe
- Bhishti
