= Al-Qa'im =

Al-Qa'im القائم
- Pronunciation: Al-Qaim; Al-Ḳāʾim
- Gender: Male

Origin
- Origin: Semitic (Arabic)
- Meaning: The riser, He who carries out the command of God (Al-Qa'im bi-amri 'llah)
- Region of origin: Arabia (Middle East)

Al-Qāʾim, al-Qaim, or al-Ḳāʾim (Arabic: القائم, "the riser") is an Arabic name or honorific.

Qa'im Al Muhammad is the eschatological figure in Shi'a Islam believed to restore religion and justice in the end of time.

People with the name or honorific al-Qāʾim bi-amr Allāh ('the one raised by (or who carries out) God's order') include:

- Muhammad al-Mahdi (869–?), 12th Shia imam, also called Muhammad al-Qa'im
- al-Qa'im (Fatimid caliph) (reigned 934–946), the second Fatimid caliph in Ifriqiya
- al-Qa'im (Abbasid caliph at Baghdad) (1031–1075), son of al-Qadir
- Abu Abdullah Muhammad ibn Faraj, rival sultan to Muhammad IV of Granada in 1327
- al-Qa'im (Abbasid caliph at Cairo) (fl. 1451–1455), caliph under Mamluk authority
- Abu Abdallah al-Qaim (fl. 1509–1517), ruler of Sous in Morocco
