= Al-Wathiq I =

4th Abbasid caliph in Mamluk Cairo

al-Wathiq I الواثق بالله
- Amir al-Mu'minin; Imam

4th Caliph of Cairo
- Reign: May 1340 – 17 June 1341 (~1 year)
- Predecessor: al-Mustakfi I
- Successor: al-Hakim II
- Died: November 1347; Cairo, Mamluk Sultanate (now Egypt)
- Issue: al-Musta'sim; al-Wathiq II
Names
- Abū Isḥāq Ibrāhīm al-Wāthiq bi-'llāh ibn Aḥmad أبو إسحاق إبراهيم الواثق بالله بن أحمد
- Dynasty: Abbasid
- Father: Ahmad ibn al-Hakim I
- Religion: Sunni Islam

Abū Isḥāq Ibrāhīm ibn Aḥmad (Arabic: أبو إسحاق إبراهيم بن أحمد, died. November 1347), better known by his regnal name al-Wāthiq (I) bi-'llāh (Arabic: الواثق بالله, lit. 'He who holds trust through God'), was the fourth Abbasid caliph of Cairo under the Mamluk Sultanate. He was installed by Mamluk sultan an-Nasir Muhammad, reigning for almost a year from 1340 to 1341, against al-Hakim II, the designated heir of the previous caliph al-Mustakfi I.

== Biography ==
=== Early life ===
Abu Ishaq Ibrahim was the son of Ahmad (or Muhammad), a son of the caliph al-Hakim I. Al-Hakim I had originally named Ahmad as his heir, going so far as to draw up a covenant of succession granting him the regnal title al-Mustamsik billah. However, Ahmad predeceased his father in October 1296. Al-Hakim I then considered Ibrahim, being Ahmad's son, as a possible successor, but reports of his lavish and allegedly impious lifestyle led the caliph to judge him unfit to hold the caliphal title. He instead named another one of his sons, Sulayman, who succeeded upon al-Hakim's death in 1302 as al-Mustakfi (I) billah. Ibrahim nevertheless continued to press his claim as the rightful successor, without success.

=== Accession and reign ===
In 1309, Sultan an-Nasir Muhammad, seeking to free himself from dominant mamluk emirs Sayf al-Din Salar and Baybars al-Jashinkir, feigned a pilgrimage and fled to al-Karak, where he began secretly raising loyal forces. When an-Nasir refused to go back to Egypt, Baibars installed himself as the Sultan of Egypt with the blessing of the powerless caliph al-Mustakfi I. Baybars soon lost popular support due to plague and bad harvests, and his troops began defecting to an-Nasir. His position worsening, he summoned al-Mustakfi I and forced him to declare an-Nasir Muhammad illegitimate. This caliphal sanction achieved nothing, and Baybars fled as an-Nasir Muhammad returned in March 1310. The caliph's backing of Baybars and his reluctant invalidations of an-Nasir Muhammad created a rift between them, and al-Mustakfi I was eventually exiled to Qus in 1337. When he died in 1340, he named his son Ahmad al-Hakim II as heir, but the still bitter an-Nasir Muhammad rejected this succession.

At this point, Ibrahim emerged as a claimant, even producing an alleged testament from his grandfather al-Hakim I naming him successor. On 15 February 1340, an-Nasir Muhammad gave Ibrahim bay'a in a secret meeting and conferred on him the regnal title al-Wathiq (I) bi-llah. A few days later, the sultan summoned the political elite to the palace for the regular monthly assembly and ordered them to swear allegiance to al-Wathiq. The qadis objected that al-Hakim II was the rightful heir of al-Mustakfi I as "no one but the caliph had the right to establish a new caliph". They also contended that al-Wathiq I was morally unfit for the office on account of his impiety. After offering lukewarm assurances that al-Wathiq I would henceforth "walk a path of righteousness", the sultan informed the qadis that their consent did not matter. Al-Wathiq I was to be honored as caliph, and from May 1340 his name was included in the Friday sermons.

Al-Wathiq I's caliphate is portrayed in an extremely unfavorable light by the hostile sources, who claim that the caliph became an insufferable presence for the ulama and other notables at the court. Numerous complaints were brought against him, including allegations of pigeon fancying, gambling, and living beyond his means. His constant need for funds to cover mounting debts reportedly led Cairo's populace to mock him as al-Musta'ti bi-llah (lit. He who begs for God), a parody of Abbasid regnal titles. Those who considered him unworthy of the office rallied behind al-Hakim II's counter-claim as the rightful heir of al-Mustakfi I, and believing they had the collective power to resist the sultan on the issue, suspended the mention of the caliph in Friday sermons. The sultan, perhaps deliberately oblivious to the controversy, ignored all appeals for al-Wathiq's removal, and maintained his stipend and other honors, which the courtiers were unable to prevent.

=== Deposition and death ===
Sultan an-Nasir Muhammad died in June 1341 after a reign of more than three decades. He had left behind a political order firmly under his control, staffed by emirs loyal to him, which enabled the smooth and bloodless succession of his chosen heir, al-Mansur Abu Bakr. Unlike his father, Abu Bakr had no reservations towards the late al-Mustakfi I, and unwilling to alienate the elites of his new court, moved swiftly to replace al-Wathiq I with al-Hakim II as caliph. Some sources claim that an-Nasir Muhammad regretted installing al-Wathiq I on his deathbed and finally heeding his courtiers' complaints, sanctioned the caliph's removal and the transfer of the office to al-Hakim II. Others state that the sultan was content to leave al-Wathiq I in office till his death. In any case, al-Wathiq I was formally replaced by al-Hakim II at al-Mansur Abu Bakr's enthronement ceremony on 18 June 1341.

Little is recorded about al-Wathiq I's life after his deposition. He was placed under house arrest, where he remained until he suffered a partial paralysis and died of plague in November 1347. Like other members of his house, he was buried in the Abbasid mausoleum near the shrine of Sayyida Nafisa. Although his tenure was brief, al-Wathiq I's installation by the Mamluk establishment set a precedent for the later imposition of his descendants as rival caliphs against the "legitimate" line of al-Mustakfi I. Two of his sons, al-Wathiq II and al-Musta'sim, were installed as caliphs by sultan Barquq after he deposed al-Mutawakkil I in 1389.

== Bibliography ==
- Garcin, Jean-Claude (1967). "Histoire, opposition, politique et piétisme traditionaliste dans le Ḥusn al Muḥādarat de Suyûti" [History, opposition, politics and traditionalistic pietism in Suyuti's Ḥusn al Muḥādarat] (PDF). Annales Islamologiques (in French). 7. Institut Français d'Archéologie Orientale: 33–90. doi:10.3406/anisl.1967.909. S2CID 259055409. Archived from the original (PDF, 14.62 MB) on 2011-07-24.
- Holt, P. M. (1984). "Some Observations on the 'Abbāsid Caliphate of Cairo". Bulletin of the School of Oriental and African Studies. 47 (3). University of London: 501–507. doi:10.1017/s0041977x00113710. JSTOR 618882. S2CID 161092185.
- Banister, Mustafa (2021). The Abbasid Caliphate of Cairo, 1261–1517: Out of the Shadows. Edinburgh: Edinburgh University Press. ISBN 9781474453363.

Al-Wathiq I Mamluk Abbasid dynasty Born: ? Died: 1347
Sunni Islam titles
Preceded by Al-Mustakfi I	Caliph of Cairo; 1340–1341	Succeeded by Al-Hakim II
