= Al-Mustakfi I (Cairo) =

3rd Abbasid Caliph in Mamluk Cairo

al-Mustakfi I المستكفي بالله
- Amir al-Mu'minin; Imam

3rd Abbasid Caliph of Cairo
- Reign: 20 January 1302 – February 1340
- Predecessor: al-Hakim I
- Successor: al-Wathiq I
- Born: 1285; Cairo, Mamluk Sultanate (now Egypt)
- Died: February 1340 (aged 56); Qus, Mamluk Sultanate (now Egypt)
- Issue: Khidr; Baraka; Muhammad; Sadaqa; al-Hakim II; al-Mu'tadid I; Hamza; Ayyub; Khalil; Abla; Sa'uda; Ruqayya; Nafisa
Names
- Abū al-Rabīʿ Sulaymān al-Mustakfī billāh ibn Aḥmad al-Ḥākim bi-Amr Allāh أبو الربيع سليمان المستكفي بالله بن أحمد الحاكم بأمر الله
- Father: al-Hakim I
- Religion: Sunni Islam

Abū al-Rabīʿ Sulaymān ibn al-Ḥākim (Arabic: أبو الربيع سليمان بن الحاكم; 1285 – February 1340), better known by his regnal name al-Mustakfī (I) bi-llāh (Arabic: المستكفي بالله, lit. 'He who is content with God alone') was the third Abbasid caliph of Cairo under the Mamluk Sultanate. His tenure of nearly four decades from 1302 to 1340, coincided almost entirely with the reign of his childhood friend, the sultan al-Nasir Muhammad.

== Biography ==
=== Background and accession ===
Abu al-Rabi Sulayman was born in early 1285 to the caliph al-Hakim I and one of his Turkic concubines. He spent his early years in a tower of the Cairo Citadel, where his father lived as a virtual prisoner and figurehead under the Mamluk sultan Qalawun. Qalawun's successors treated the elderly caliph more favourably, and Sulayman came of age in the Abbasid palace in Cairo. In his youth, he befriended the future sultan al-Nasir Muhammad. Being roughly the same age, the two princes bonded over polo, archery and hunting.

Sulayman had at least one elder brother, Ahmad (or Muhammad), whom al-Hakim had designated as his successor. Ahmad, however, predeceased his father in 1296. Al-Hakim then considered naming Ahmad's son Ibrahim as heir, but abandoned the idea after hearing reports of the young man's dissolute conduct. Sulayman, as the eldest surviving son, became the next candidate, though al-Hakim hesitated on account of his youth and inexperience. Two days before his death on 19 January 1302, the elderly caliph formally designated Sulayman as his successor.

Al-Nasir Muhammad shared al-Hakim's concerns about the youth of his friend, who was about 17 years old at the time. Initially declining to accept the succession, he relented only after the chief qadis attested to Sulayman's suitability for the office. Once the funeral observances for his father had concluded, Sulayman was proclaimed caliph al-Mustakfi billah by al-Nasir Muhammad on 25 January 1302, in a ceremony held at the Cairo Citadel. As had been done for his father, the sultan and the emirs swore allegiance to the new caliph, and coins bearing his name were minted. A few days later, the caliph and his household were moved from their residence in the city to new quarters in the Citadel, and their stipend was also increased.

=== Involvement in Ilkhanid Wars ===
Soon after his accession, al-Mustakfi, like his father before him, became involved in Cairo's diplomatic dealings with the Ilkhanate. Before his death, al-Hakim had accompanied the Mamluk army against the Ilkhan Ghazan's invasion of Syria, which resulted in a heavy Mamluk defeat at the Battle of Wadi al-Khazandar and the brief occupation of Damascus by the Muslim Mongol ruler. Cairo nevertheless kept up its hostile stance. In one letter, the sultan demanded that, as a condition of peace, Ghazan mint coins bearing the names of the caliph al-Mustakfi and the sultan al-Nasir Muhammad alongside his own.

In April 1303, Ghazan launched his third invasion of Syria. Al-Nasir Muhammad marched out of Egypt with al-Mustakfi and his army in response. At the ensuing Battle of Marj al-Saffar, the caliph rode beside the sultan and served as a living standard, reciting from the Quran to bolster the morale of the troops. The Mamluk forces were victorious and drove the Mongols out of Syria, after which the sultan and the caliph made a triumphal entry into Damascus amid great celebration. Hostilities with the Ilkhanate subsided after Ghazan's death the following year, and the battle proved to be the last major Mongol invasion of Syria. In 1306, when the Rasulid vassals ruling over Yemen began to distance themselves from Cairo, Cairo sent letters in al-Mustakfi's name, accompanied by somewhat hollow threats of invasion.

=== Usurpation of Baybars al-Jashnikir ===
Since the beginning of his second reign in 1299, al-Nasir Muhammad was overshadowed by two powerful emirs of his father: Sayf al-Din Salar and Baybars al-Jashnikir. Unwilling to be dominated by them, the sultan attempted to have them arrested. The attempt failed, and aware that the two emirs would sooner or later depose or kill him, he resolved to leave their power base in Cairo. In 1309 he set out on the pretext of performing the hajj, but instead withdrew to al-Karak, where he began gathering forces and building alliances with the Levantine emirs against Salar and Baybars. When an-Nasir Muhammad refused to return to Egypt, Salar and his Circassian mamluks proclaimed Baybars as sultan and Salar as his na'ib. Al-Mustakfi had little choice but to confirm Baybars's accession as al-Malik al-Muzaffar.

Baybars's popularity soon declined, as plague and poor harvests undermined his reign, and his position worsened further as many of his troops defected to al-Nasir Muhammad. Amid rumours of the former sultan's imminent return, Baybars compelled al-Mustakfi to issue a public declaration rejecting al-Nasir Muhammad's dynastic claim. The document asserted that "kingship is childless", implying that no sultan had the right to appoint his own successor and that this power belonged to the caliph alone. Therefore, Baybars was not a usurper of the Qalawunid dynasty, and disobedience to a sultan sanctioned by the caliph was equivalent to disobeying the Prophet himself.

The declaration had little effect however, and both the populace and the army at large continued to favour al-Nasir Muhammad. Baybars sent a copy of the document to the defecting mamluks, whose leader replied to the messenger, "Tell that fool [Baybars] that not a single person remains turned towards the caliph". The caliph's endorsement failed to win Baybars any meaningful support, and he fled Cairo days before al-Nasir Muhammad returned. Baybars was later executed, and Salar died in prison soon afterwards.

=== Detention and exile ===
On 5 March 1310, al-Nasir Muhammad began his third reign with an enthronement ceremony. When al-Mustakfi approached to congratulate him, the sultan bitterly asked, "Are you here to greet a khariji?" The fearful caliph made no reply. In public, the Cairo chancery presented an image of unity by drafting a new deed of investiture in al-Mustakfi's name. The deed affirmed the legitimacy of al-Nasir Muhammad's hereditary claim to the sultanate and stated that the caliph had recognised Baybars only under duress. Nevertheless, the friendship between the two men had soured. Al-Nasir Muhammad began considering the caliph as a potential liability, and kept him in seclusion, bringing him out only for official ceremonies. Al-Mustakfi took part in the inauguration of the completed shrine mosque of Sayyida Nafisa in 1314, and in 1320 he accompanied the sultan on the hajj.

Al-Nasir Muhammad, meanwhile, continued consolidating his hold on power by purging rivals and cultivating a political elite that depended on his person rather than on the caliphate. Amid this climate of purges and paranoia, rumors surfaced that the caliph was conspiring with a network of emirs and scholars. A letter in the caliph's handwriting accusing the sultan of neglecting religious affairs also appeared. Intrigues within the Abbasid family were the tipping point, when the caliph's son Muhammad was found to be in contact with Isma'ili assassins in the city. Another son, Sadaqa, was implicated in a scandal involving a mamluk and was reputed to hold lavish parties at the Abbasid residences. Meanwhile, al-Mustakfi's nephew Ibrahim, who had been passed over by al-Hakim as heir, continued to slander his uncle in the hope of obtaining the caliphal office for himself. As a result, in June 1336, the caliph and his household were put under house arrest in the tower of the Cairo Citadel.

The detention lasted just over five months, until the influential emir Qawsun persuaded the sultan to return al-Mustakfi to his former residence. A qadi, however, urged al-Nasir Muhammad to take decisive action against the caliph, warning that al-Mustakfi might publicly protest his recent treatment, which would have serious political consequences. The sultan feared that confinement in the Citadel was not enough, and that the caliph could again be used to legitimise a usurper or to obstruct his own succession plans. On 19 July 1337, al-Nasir Muhammad banished al-Mustakfi and around a hundred members of the Abbasid family to the remote town of Qus in Upper Egypt. In the following years, the caliph's annual stipend was reduced from 5,000 to only 1,000 dirhams, and the authorities in Cairo kept the family under strict restrictions. Al-Mustakfi nevertheless remained popular with the population, and his name continued to be mentioned in the Friday sermon.

=== Death and succession ===
Al-Mustakfi spent the rest of his life in exile at Qus. In 1339 his son and heir Sadaqa died, and the caliph fell into a deep depression from which he did not recover, and died a few months later in February 1340. Before his death, he designated his son Ahmad as his successor as al-Hakim (II) bi-Amr Allah. The governor of Qus informed al-Nasir Muhammad, who, still resentful, refused to recognise the succession. He eventually proclaimed al-Mustakfi's nephew Ibrahim, who had long sought the office, as caliph al-Wathiq (I) billah. Al-Wathiq's caliphate was short-lived as al-Nasir Muhammad died little more than a year after his childhood friend, and his son and successor al-Mansur Abu Bakr deposed al-Wathiq I and installed al-Hakim II in his place.

== Family ==
Al-Mustakfi had several children. He designated three of his sons as heir in succession, but all of them predeceased him: the eldest, Khidr, in 1310; Baraka in 1315; and Sadaqa in 1339, shortly before his father's death. Two other sons later became caliphs: Ahmad al-Hakim II and Abu Bakr al-Mu'tadid I. His other sons were Muhammad, Hamza, Ayyub and Khalil. He also had at least four daughters: Abla, Sa'uda, Ruqayya and Nafisa.

== Bibliography ==
- Banister, Mustafa (2021). The Abbasid Caliphate of Cairo, 1261–1517: Out of the Shadows. Edinburgh: Edinburgh University Press. ISBN 9781474453363.
- Holt, P. M. (1984). "Some Observations on the 'Abbāsid Caliphate of Cairo". Bulletin of the School of Oriental and African Studies. 47 (3). University of London: 501–507. doi:10.1017/s0041977x00113710. JSTOR 618882. S2CID 161092185.
- Ibn Taghribirdi. Al-Nujum al-Zahira fi Muluk Misr wa'l-Qahira [The Shining Stars among the Kings of Egypt and Cairo] (in Arabic). Vol. 8.
- Al-Maqrizi. Al-Suluk li-Ma'rifat Duwal al-Muluk [The Path to Knowledge of the Dynasties of Kings] (in Arabic). Vol. 2.
- Al-Shayyal, Jamal al-Din. Tarikh Misr al-Islamiyya [History of Islamic Egypt] (in Arabic). Vol. 2.

Al-Mustakfi I Mamluk Abbasid dynasty Born: 1285 Died: February 1340
Sunni Islam titles
Preceded by Al-Hakim I	Caliph of Cairo; 20 January 1302 – February 1340	Succeeded by Al-Wathiq I
