= Al-Musta'sim (Cairo) =

8th Abbasid caliph in Mamluk Cairo

al-Musta'sim المستعصم بالله
- Amir al-Mu'minin; Imam

8th Caliph of Cairo
- Reign: 11 July 1377 – July 1377 (<2 weeks)
- Predecessor: al-Mutawakkil I
- Successor: al-Mutawakkil I

(second period)
- Reign: 21 November 1386 – March 1389 (~3 years)
- Predecessor: al-Wathiq II
- Successor: al-Mutawakkil I
- Died: 1399; Cairo, Mamluk Sultanate (now Egypt)
Names
- Abū Yaḥyā Zakariyyāʾ al-Mustaʿṣim bi-'llāh ibn Ibrāhīm al-Wāthiq bi-'llāh أبو يحيى زكريا المستعصم بالله بن إبراهيم الواثق بالله
- Dynasty: Abbasid
- Father: al-Wathiq I
- Religion: Sunni Islam

Abū Yaḥyā Zakariyyāʾ ibn al-Wāthiq (Arabic: أبو يحيى زكريا بن الواثق; died 1399), better known by his regnal name al-Mustaʿṣim bi-'llāh (Arabic: المستعصم بالله, lit. 'He who holds trust through God'), was the eighth Abbasid caliph of Cairo under the tutelage of the Mamluk Sultanate. He was installed as caliph briefly in 1377, and then again from 1386 to 1389.

== Biography ==
=== Background and first reign ===
Muhyi al-Din Zakariyya was the son of al-Wathiq I, who was briefly installed as caliph in 1340 by mamluk sultan an-Nasir Muhammad, but removed the next year. In 1377, the young sultan al-Ashraf Sha'ban was killed by some revolting mamluks lead by emir Aynabak al-Badri. Aynabak wished to install his stepson Ahmad as a puppet sultan, presenting him as a son of former sultan an-Nasir Hassan. When he asked caliph al-Mutawakkil I to sanction this assention as well as declare Sha'ban's murder lawful, the caliph promptly refused. Enraged, Aynabak ordered the caliph be removed from his office and exiled.

In need of a caliph on his side to maintain legitimacy amidst his rivals, Aynabak looked on other branches of the Abbasid family, primarily al-Wathiq I's descendants who himself was installed by Mamluk establishment against the reigning line of al-Mustakfi I. He selected Zakariyya and installed him as al-Musta'sim billah, without even obtaining an abdication from al-Mutawakkil I or the consensus of the elites. Aynabak's hold on power did not last long, and although he gave in to pressure to restore al-Mutawakkil I, he was soon overthrown by the army. Altogether, al-Musta'sim reign lasted less than a fortnight.

=== Second Reign ===
In 1383, al-Mutawakkil I was again deposed by az-Zahir Barquq, having been accused of plotting to overthrow the sultan. Barquq then installed al-Musta'sim's brother al-Wathiq II as caliph. Upon al-Wathiq II's death in 1386, Barquq recalled and reinstated al-Musta'sim as his successor. He also restored the stewardship of the shrine of Sayyida Nafisa to al-Musta'sim and the Abbasid family.

In 1389, Yalbugha al-Nasiri, the mamluk emir of Aleppo, and Mintash, a mamluk of al-Ashraf Sha'ban, launched a massive revolt to overthrow Barquq and restore power to the house of Qalawun. After defeating Barquq's forces, Yalbugha declared himself a champion of al-Mutawakkil I claiming to act for his restoration. Desparation mounting, Barquq deposed al-Musta'sim and restored al-Mutawakkil I in March 1389. This restoration did little to halt rebel advance on Cairo, and Barquq fled after the city fell to Yalbugha. The victorious emirs reinstalled as-Salih Hajji as sultan after al-Mutawakkil I refused the offer. Soon after, Yalbugha and Mintash fell out with each other, and a returning Barquq was able to retake his throne. The returning sultan maintained his goodwill with al-Mutawakkil I and imprisoned al-Musta'sim, who eventually died in 1399. He was the last Abbasid from the line of al-Wathiq II to be put to the office. After al-Mutawakkil's restoration, the title remained with his descendants till the Ottoman conquest in 1517.

== Bibliography ==
- Levanoni, Amalia (1995). A Turning Point in Mamluk History: The Third Reign of Al-Nāṣir Muḥammad Ibn Qalāwūn (1310-1341). Brill. ISBN 9789004101821.
- Banister, Mustafa (2021). The Abbasid Caliphate of Cairo, 1261–1517: Out of the Shadows. Edinburgh: Edinburgh University Press. ISBN 9781474453363.
- Holt, P.M. (2014). The Age of the Crusades: the Near East from the Eleventh Century to 1517. Routledge. ISBN 978-1-317-87152-1.
- Bosworth, C. E. (1996). The New Islamic Dynasties: A Chronological and Genealogical Manual. New York: Columbia University Press. ISBN 978-0-231-10714-3.

Al-Musta'sim (Cairo) Mamluk Abbasid dynasty Born: ? Died: 1399
Sunni Islam titles
Preceded by Al-Mutawakkil I	Caliph of Cairo; 1377	Succeeded by Al-Mutawakkil I
Preceded by Al-Wathiq II	Caliph of Cairo; 1386–1389	Succeeded by Al-Mutawakkil I
