= Muhammad ibn al-Qa'im =

11th-century Abbasid prince and heir-apparent

Muhammad ibn al-Qa'im محمد ابن القائم

Heir apparent of the Abbasid Caliphate
- Tenure: 1039–40 – 1056
- Born: 1039–40; Baghdad, Abbasid Caliphate
- Died: 1056; Baghdad, Abbasid Caliphate
- Burial: Baghdad
- Spouse: Urjuwuan
- Issue: Al-Muqtadi
Names
- Muhammad ibn al-Qa'im ibn Ahmad al-Qadir
Era name and dates
- Later Abbasid era: 11th century
- Dynasty: Abbasid
- Father: Al-Qa'im
- Religion: Sunni Islam

Muhammad ibn al-Qa'im (Arabic: محمد ابن القائم) also known as Dhakirat al-Mulk (Arabic: ذخيرة الملك) was an Abbasid prince, son of Abbasid caliph Al-Qa'im. He was designated as heir apparent by his father in the mid-eleventh century CE but died before his father.

== Biography ==
Muhammad was the son of Abbasid caliph Al-Qa'im who reigned from 1031 to 1075 and the grandson of caliph al-Qadir. His full name was Muhammad ibn Abdallah al-Qa'im ibn Ahmad al-Qadir. He was known in Baghdad as Muhammad Dhakirat al-Mulk. His Kunya was Abu al-Abbas.

In 1030, his grandfather, al-Qadir named his son Abu Ja'far al-Qa'im, as his heir, a decision taken completely independently of the Buyīd emirs. During the first half of al-Qa'im's long reign, hardly a day passed in the capital without turmoil. Frequently the city was left without a ruler; the Buyīd emir was often forced to flee the capital. While the Seljuk influence grew, Dawud Chaghri Beg married his daughter, Khadija Arslan Khatun, to al-Qa'im in 1056. Khadija Arslan Khatun had initially been betrothed to Muhammad. However, after Muhammad unexpectedly died, and Khadija Arslan married Al-Qa'im.

His father, al-Qa'im nominated him heir apparent in mid eleventh century however he died during his father's reign and his father then nominated his son, Abdallāh (future Al-Muqtadi) as next Heir-apparent. In 1075 al-Muqtadi succeeded his grandfather, when al-Qa'im died at the age of 73–74. Al-Muqtadi was born to Muhammad Dhakirat, the son of caliph al-Qa'im, and an Armenian slave girl called Urjuwuan, She was also known as Qurrut al-Ayn.

== Sources ==
- Busse, Heribert (2004) [1969]. Chalif und Grosskönig - Die Buyiden im Irak (945-1055) [Caliph and Great King - The Buyids in Iraq (945-1055)] (in German). Würzburg: Ergon Verlag. ISBN 3-89913-005-7.
- Sourdel, D. (1978). "al-Ḳādir Bi'llāh". In van Donzel, E.; Lewis, B.; Pellat, Ch. & Bosworth, C. E. (eds.). The Encyclopaedia of Islam, Second Edition. Volume IV: Iran–Kha. Leiden: E. J. Brill. pp. 378–379. ISBN 978-90-04-05745-6. OCLC 758278456.
- Lambton, A.K.S. (1988). Continuity and Change in Medieval Persia. Bibliotheca Persica. Bibliotheca Persica. ISBN 978-0-88706-133-2.
- Bosworth, C. E. (1968). "The Political and Dynastic History of the Iranian World (A.D. 1000–1217)". In Boyle, John Andrew (ed.). The Cambridge History of Iran: The Saljuq and Mongol Periods. Vol. 5. Cambridge: Cambridge University Press. pp. 1–202. ISBN 0-521-06936-X.
- This text is adapted from William Muir's public domain, The Caliphate: Its Rise, Decline, and Fall.
