= Al-Wathiq II =

Ninth Abbasid caliph of Cairo under the Mamluk Sultanate

al-Wathiq II الواثق بالله
- Amir al-Mu'minin; Imam

9th Abbasid Caliph of Cairo
- Reign: September 1383 – 13 November 1386 (~3 years)
- Predecessor: al-Mutawakkil I
- Successor: al-Musta'sim
- Born: c. 1316; Cairo, Mamluk Sultanate (now Egypt)
- Died: 13 November 1386 (aged 70); Cairo, Mamluk Sultanate (now Egypt)
Names
- Abū Ḥafṣ ʿUmar al-Wāthiq bi-'llāh ibn ibn Ibrāhīm al-Wāthiq bi-'llāh أبو حفص عمر الواثق بالله بن إبراهيم الواثق بالله
- Dynasty: Abbasid
- Father: al-Wathiq I
- Religion: Sunni Islam

Abū Ḥafṣ ʿUmar ibn al-Wāthiq (Arabic: أبو حفص عمر بن الواثق, c. 1316 – 13 November 1386), better known by his regnal name al-Wāthiq (II) bi-'llāh (Arabic: الواثق بالله, lit. 'He who holds trust through God'), was the ninth Abbasid caliph of Cairo under the Mamluk Sultanate. He was installed by Mamluk sultan Barquq, reigning from 1383 till his death in 1386.

== Biography ==
Rukn al-Din Umar was the son of caliph al-Wathiq I, who was briefly installed as caliph by Sultan an-Nasir Muhammad in 1340. In 1382, sultan as-Salih Hajji was usurped by his regent az-Zahir Barquq. Soon after, Barquq faced significant pushback from pro-Bahri mamluk establishment against his reign. In this political climate, the reigning caliph al-Mutwakkil I was accused of being part of one of such plots. Barquq, unwilling to disturb his elites and masses by executing the caliph, instead imprisoned him. He then installed Umar as al-Wathiq (II) billah. Public opinion stayed firmly on side of al-Mutwakkil I however, but was insufficient to sway Barquq, who just released al-Mutawakkil I from prison and let him stay at his residence. Al-Wathiq II effectively remained a non-entity and died on 13 November 1386, aged 70, of an illness. Barquq then appointed his brother Zakariyya al-Musta'sim billah as his successor.

== Bibliography ==
- Bosworth, C. E. (1996). The New Islamic Dynasties: A Chronological and Genealogical Manual. New York: Columbia University Press. ISBN 978-0-231-10714-3.
- Banister, Mustafa (2021). The Abbasid Caliphate of Cairo, 1261–1517: Out of the Shadows. Edinburgh: Edinburgh University Press. ISBN 9781474453363.
- Holt, P.M. (2014). The Age of the Crusades: the Near East from the Eleventh Century to 1517. Routledge. ISBN 978-1-317-87152-1.

Al-Wathiq II Mamluk Abbasid dynasty Born: 1316 Died: 1386
Sunni Islam titles
Preceded by Al-Mutawakkil I	Caliph of Cairo; 1383–1386	Succeeded by Al-Musta'sim
