= Al-Mutawakkil I =

7th Abbasid Caliph of Cairo

Al-Mutawakkil I المتوكل الأول

7th Caliph of the Cairo (first period)
- Reign: 1362 – 1377
- Predecessor: al-Mu'tadid I
- Successor: al-Musta'sim

(second period)
- Reign: 1377–1383
- Predecessor: al-Musta'sim
- Successor: al-Wathiq II

(third period)
- Reign: 1389 – 9 January 1406
- Predecessor: al-Musta'sim
- Successor: al-Musta'in
- Born: unknown date Cairo, Mamluk Sultanate now Egypt
- Died: 9 January 1406; Cairo, Mamluk Sultanate now Egypt
- Spouse: Bay Khatun, Kazal
- Issue: al-Musta'in; al-Mu'tadid II; al-Mustakfi II; al-Qa'im; al-Mustanjid; Yaʿqūb
- Father: al-Mu'tadid I
- Religion: Sunni Islam

Abu Abd Allah Muhammad ibn Abi Bakr (Note: Arabic: أبو عبد الله محمد بن أبي بكر, romanized: ʾAbū ʿAbd Allāh Muḥammad ibn ʾAbī Bakr.) (died 9 January 1406), commonly known as al-Mutawakkil I, (Note: Arabic: المتوكل على الله الأول, romanized: Al-Mutawakkil ʿalā Allāh al-ʾAwwal, lit. 'He who relies on God'.) was the seventh Abbasid caliph of Cairo, reigning from 1362 to 1383 and then from 1389 to 1406, under the Mamluk Sultanate.

== Biography ==
During his reign Khallas Mansour Mohammed in 764 and the Sultanate's accession to his cousin Ashraf Shaaban bin Hussein bin Nasser bin Qalawun. In 767, the Franks and the King of Cyprus took possession of Alexandria. The Crusades did not end with the expulsion of the Crusaders from Acre in 690 and their completion from all the Levant during the days of Ashraf Salah al-Din Khalil ibn al-Mansur Qalawun. They were expelled from the island of Arwad in 702 days. But the Crusades continued because many of the Crusaders had taken refuge in the island of Cyprus after being expelled from the Levant, and they took this island as a stable, and they raided the lands of the Muslims whenever they found the opportunity for them. The Luzganan family, which ruled the island at that time, Mission, mother has taken over This family and the rule of the island in 760 Peter I, has visited Western Europe, and called on the Pope and the kings of Europe to help him to wage a war against Muslims, got some support and walked with those who came from the Crusaders and occupied Alexandria.

In 778 Al-Ashraf Shaaban was killed and the Sultanate surrendered to his son Al-Mansur Ali. He remained in his command until he died in 783. He was succeeded by his brother Saleh Haji for one year and then took off. The order was taken by Sultan Al-Zaher Barqouq, the first of the Circassian Mamluks. Al-Mutawakil was ordered to go out to the city of Qus by the prince of Asakir Aybak al-Badri, who came to Zakaria ibn al-Khalifa, the believer, and gave him the office without any allegiance or unanimity. The Caliph traveled to Qus and returned to his home. Fifteen days later he returned to the office and removed Zakaria. The office was only fifteen days, on the twentieth of the first spring of 779 AH.

In 785 Sultan Barqouq captured the Al-Mutawakil I and imprisoned him in Qal'at al-Jabal, deposed him from the office, and he pledged allegiance to the Muhammad ibn al-Wathiq. He remained in the office for three years. Al-Mutawakil I did not accept it, but Zakariya asked for a trusted brother who sat on the throne for fifteen days without a sale of the year 779 AH, and he took the office and called the name of the Al-Mu'tasim. He remained in succession until 791 AH and returned to the office, removed Al-Musta'sim. Al-Mutawakil continued the office until 808 AH. In the month of Jumada al-Akhirah of the same year (791) Sultan Barqouq was arrested and imprisoned in Karak. Sultan Al-Salih Haji was returned to the Sultanate. He changed his title from Al-Salih to Al-Mansour, but remained in the Sultanate for eight months. Al-Mansur Haji took off in the month of Safar in 792 AH, and ended the reign of the Calawan family. The rule of the Mamluks passed and the Mamluks of Circassia.

In political tension climate, the caliph al-Mutwakkil I was accused of being part of one of political plots. Barquq, unwilling to disturb his elites and masses by executing the caliph, instead imprisoned him. He then installed Umar as al-Wathiq II billah. Public opinion stayed firmly on side of al-Mutwakkil I however, but was insufficient to sway Barquq, who just released al-Mutawakkil I from prison and let him stay at his residence.

al-Mutawakkil I was third time installed in the office, this time he remained from 1389 to 1406. He was finally succeeded by Abu al-Fadl al-Musta'in, who was his son by a Turkish concubine named Bay Khatun. He succeeded his father as caliph on 22 January 1406.

== Sources ==
- Banister, Mustafa (2021). The Abbasid Caliphate of Cairo, 1261–1517: Out of the Shadows. Edinburgh: Edinburgh University Press. ISBN 9781474453363.
- Garcin, Jean-Claude (1967). "Histoire, opposition, politique et piétisme traditionaliste dans le Ḥusn al Muḥādarat de Suyûti" [History, opposition, politics and traditionalistic pietism in Suyuti's Ḥusn al Muḥādarat] (PDF). Annales Islamologiques (in French). 7. Institut Français d'Archéologie Orientale: 33–90. doi:10.3406/anisl.1967.909. S2CID 259055409. Archived from the original (PDF, 14.62 MB) on 2011-07-24.
- Holt, P. M. (1984). "Some Observations on the 'Abbāsid Caliphate of Cairo". Bulletin of the School of Oriental and African Studies. 47 (3). University of London: 501–507. doi:10.1017/s0041977x00113710. JSTOR 618882. S2CID 161092185.

Al-Mutawakkil I Mamluk Abbasid dynasty Born: ? Died: 1406
Sunni Islam titles
Preceded by Al-Mu'tadid I	Caliph of Cairo; 1362–1377	Succeeded by Al-Musta'sim
Preceded by Al-Musta'sim	Caliph of Cairo; 1377–1383	Succeeded by Al-Wathiq II
Preceded by Al-Musta'sim	Caliph of Cairo; 1389–1406	Succeeded by Al-Musta'in
