= Al-Hakim I =

2nd Abbasid caliph in Mamluk Cairo

al-Hakim I الحاكم بأمر الله
- Amir al-Mu'minin; Imam

2nd Abbasid Caliph of Cairo
- Reign: 16 November 1262 – 19 January 1302 (~39 years)
- Predecessor: al-Mustansir II
- Successor: al-Mustakfi I
- Born: 1222/1232; Baghdad, Abbasid Caliphate (now Iraq)
- Died: 19 January 1302 (aged 70-80); Cairo, Mamluk Sultanate (now Egypt)
- Burial: Cairo
- Issue: al-Mustakfi I; Ahmad
Names
- Abū'l-ʿAbbās Aḥmad al-Ḥākim bi-Amri'llāh ibn al-Ḥasan أبو العباس أحمد الحاكم بأمر الله بن الحسن
- Father: al-Hasan ibn Ali ibn Abi Bakr ibn al-Mustarshid (or Ali ibn Abi Bakr ibn Husayn ibn al-Rashid ibn al-Mustarshid)
- Religion: Sunni Islam

Abū'l-ʿAbbās Aḥmad ibn al-Ḥasan (Arabic: أبو العباس أحمد بن الحسن; 1222/32 – 19 January 1302), better known by his regnal name al-Ḥākim (I) bi-Amri'llāh (Arabic: الحاكم بأمر الله, lit. 'He who rules by the word of God') was the second Abbasid caliph of Cairo under the Mamluk Sultanate, and the progenitor of all the subsequent caliphs of Cairo. First proclaimed by the mamluk emir of Aleppo against his predecessor al-Mustansir II, he was formally recognized by sultan Baybars in 1262.

== Biography ==
=== Background ===
Ahmad ibn Hasan was allegedly a descendant of the Abbasid caliph al-Mustarshid (r. 1118-1135) through his son Abu Bakr (or through another son, caliph al-Rashid). Nothing is known of his life before the Mongol sack of Baghdad in 1258. The Mongol army executed the reigning caliph, al-Musta'sim, and as part of a policy of eliminating the Abbasid family members, intended to immure him. The builder commissioned for this purpose instead took pity on him and let him escape alongside other companions, to the Bedouin Khafaja tribe on the lower Euphrates in early 1259.

Ahmad's claim of being an Abbasid was accepted by his Bedouin hosts, who forwarded him to Syria, where he met Isa ibn Muhanna, chief of Al Fadl Bedouin. Isa informed the Ayyubid emir of Damascus, al-Nasir Yusuf, of Ahmad's arrival, who then summoned him to Damascus. However, the Mongol invasion of Syria postponed this journey. In March 1260, Damascus fell to Mongols and al-Nasir Yusuf fled to Cairo. The same year, the mamluks of Ayyubid sultan as-Salih Ayyub, under their sultan Qutuz, defeated the Mongols at Ain Jalut, and drove them out of Syria. At this point, Isa ibn Muhanna again attempted to alert the paramount sultan of Ahmad and his eligibility for the vacant caliphate.

Qutuz rewarded Isa by formally granting him Salamiyya as an iqta, and (according to later sources) instructed Isa to send Ahmad to Cairo at a later date for official investiture. He also dispatched his emir Kilij al-Baghdadi to pledge allegiance to Ahmad on his behalf and to accompany him on a campaign to recover Baghdad from the Mongols. Their combined forces captured several towns along the Euphrates but were defeated by a Mongol army near al-Fallujah in late 1260, forcing Ahmad to withdraw to Salamiyya.

=== Proclamation in Syria ===
Two months after Ain Jalut, a group of Mamluks assassinated Qutuz, possibly with the involvement of Baybars al-Bunduqdari, who succeeded him as sultan. Ahmad remained in Salamiyya for several months until June 1261, when the Mamluk governor of Damascus, Taybars al-Waziri, summoned him and sent him on to Cairo. On the way, Ahmad learned that Baybars had already installed another Abbasid survivor, Ahmad ibn al-Zahir, an uncle of al-Musta’sim, as caliph al-Mustansir billah. With a caliph already proclaimed, Ahmad feared that that he was likely heading to be imprisoned or killed, so he fled back to Salamiyya. By then Isa ibn Muhanna was in conflict with Aqqush al-Barli, the Mamluk emir of Aleppo and a rival of Baybars.

United by a common interest in wider acceptance for their respective ambitions, Aqqush helped al-Hakim acquiring broad recognition as caliph in Syria and Northern al-Jazira, while he lent legitimacy to Aqqush’s rule over these lands. The same month, Aqqush pledged allegiance to Ahmad as caliph under the regnal title al-Hakim bi-Amr Allah, minted coins in his name, and had his name recited in the Friday sermon.

Baybars, meanwhile, set out to bring Syria under his control. In August 1261, after a series of skirmishes with the sultan's troops, Aqqush offered his submission, but Baybars only agreed to accept it in person in Cairo. Around the same time, Aqqush learned that Baybars was sending out two forces: one to drive him out of Aleppo, and another under al-Mustansir to retake Baghdad from the Mongols. Possibly as a gesture of goodwill toward Baybars, Aqqush gave al-Hakim 1,000 soldiers to join al-Mustansir’s expedition. In October, this force reached the town of Ana, but its inhabitants refused to open the gates, declaring that they would accept only the “true caliph” al-Mustansir, whom the sultan himself had invested. Al-Mustansir’s army arrived soon afterward, and most of al-Hakim’s troops defected to him. Al-Mustansir urged al-Hakim to unite for the sake of the Abbasid family. Left with no alternative, al-Hakim gave up his claim and recognized al-Mustansir as the rightful caliph.

Strengthened by al-Hakim’s troops, al-Mustansir pressed on and seized the town of Hit before encountering a Mongol army near al-Anbar on the Euphrates. In the ensuing battle on 28 November 1261, the caliphal army was defeated and al-Mustansir was killed. Al-Hakim, who may have betrayed his ally by withdrawing at the decisive moment, escaped with almost fifty survivors to Isa ibn Muhanna at al-Rahba. From there, he continued west to Damascus and then to Cairo, arriving in February 1262.

=== Reign under Baybars ===
By the time al-Hakim reached Cairo, the enthusiasm surrounding recently proclaimed al-Mustansir had faded away. Baybars was no longer as invested in receiving caliphal legitimacy, with al-Mustansir's name already removed from coinage. Baybars granted al-Hakim a stipend and lodged him in the Cairo citadel, where he spent most of 1262 without receiving a formal oath of allegiance from the sultan.

By October 1262, however, Baybars needed al-Hakim when Berke Khan, the recently converted Muslim Khan of the Golden Horde, approached him to form an alliance against the Ilkhanate. Berke had backed the losing side, Ariq Böke, in the recent Mongol civil war, and he had been further angered by Hulegu’s sack of Baghdad. On 12 November 1262, Baybars formally pledged allegiance to al-Hakim, who in turn confirmed the sultan’s authority over his lands. Baybars also presented the caliph before the Golden Horde envoys as a central figure of religion protected by the sultan of Cairo. The envoys attended al-Hakim's first Friday sermon and prayer, and Baybars sent Berke a copy of the sermon and a genealogy tracing al-Hakim to the Prophet Muhammad. When another Golden Horde embassy arrived in Cairo in May 1263, al-Hakim used his farewell address to call on Berke to join the jihad against the Ilkhanate and urged the envoys to speak well of Baybars to their master. In the envoys’ presence, Baybars also inducted al-Hakim into the futuwwa brotherhood.

Once the alliance with Berke was formalized, al-Hakim was gradually withdrawn from the public life, and his name too was removed from the coinage. Baybars barred military officers from visiting him and severely restricted his movements. Only scholars, who posed less of a threat, were allowed to see him. Al-Hakim spent most of the sultan's reign in this confinement, though the latter continued to draw on the caliph’s authority, publicizing his investitures by the caliph and his predecessor in inscriptions.

=== Reign under Barakah and Qalawun ===
Baybars died on 30 June 1277, and was succeeded by his son al-Sa'id Barakah. Lacking a strong power base of his own, Barakah relied on the caliph as a mediator with the rival mamluk emirs. When he began replacing his father’s emirs with his own mamluks in key positions, they revolted in 1279. As his support dwindled, the emirs besieged the Citadel until Barakah agreed to abdicate and go into exile at al-Karak. He was replaced by his younger brother, al-Adil Salamish, with the powerful emir Qalawun as regent. The caliph’s name, which had been restored to the coinage under Barakah, was removed again and replaced with Qalawun’s. By November 1279, Qalawun had amassed enough power to usurp Salamish and proclaim himself sultan al-Malik al-Mansur.

Under Qalawun, the restrictions on al-Hakim grew tighter still. The caliph was excluded from official ceremonies and played no role in politics. Unlike Baybars and his sons, Qalawun did not even seek formal investiture from the caliph on his accession, with al-Hakim probably not even present at the ceremony. Even so, Qalawun continued to draw on the symbolic and theoretical value of the caliphate to legitimize his rule. In 1280 the governor of Damascus Sunqur al-Ashqar attempted to establish a rival sultanate, declaring himself sultan and minting coins in the caliph’s name. Qalawun responded tersely that the caliph was under his “protection,” not Sunqur’s, which made Qalawun the legitimate sultan.

Qalawun also invoked the caliph in his dealings with other Muslim powers. In 1282, the Ilkhan Tekuder Ahmad, a son of Hulegu, converted to Islam. This conversion did not end the hostilities between the Ilkhanate and the Mamluk Sultanate, however, and an embassy he sent to Cairo still demanded submission on threat of war. In his reply, Qalawun praised al-Hakim as the “cousin of the master of prophets and caliph to whom the people of religion cling”, implying that if Tekuder wished to be a sincere Muslim, he too was obliged to acknowledge the caliph who sanctified the authority of the sultanate of Cairo.

=== Reign under al-Ashraf Khalil ===
Qalawun's death in 1290 and the succession of his son, al-Ashraf Khalil, restored al-Hakim's caliphate to prominence, possibly more than any other Mamluk sultan before. Khalil lacked the loyalty of his father’s mamluks, and his need for legitimacy, and possibly genuine personal piety, led him to reach for the caliph. He revived the public oath of allegiance to the caliph, a tradition which Qalawun had discontinued. In 1291, after capturing the last crusader stronghold at Acre, he bestowed special gifts and honors on the caliph. Al-Hakim was given a new residence and a retinue of attendants, and Khalil went so far as to style himself muhyi al-dawla al-abbasiyya ("reviver of the Abbasid state") on his coins and inscriptions.

The caliph also became central to the sultan’s war preparations against the Ilkhanate and its Armenian allies. He delivered public sermons for the first time in years, and gave farewell addresses before the sultan’s armies set out to besiege Rumkale in March 1292. The reign of the young and energetic sultan was cut short, however, when he was assassinated on 9 December 1293 during a hunting expedition by his na’ib, Baydara, and by Lajin al-Mansuri.

=== Reign under Lajin and an-Nasir Muhammad ===
After Khalil's death, the mamluk emirs installed his younger brother an-Nasir Muhammad as a figurehead sultan. Within a year his regent Kitbugha deposed him and, as had happened to Barakah years earlier, exiled him to al-Karak. Kitbugha and his emirs ordered al-Hakim to formally endorse the coup, which the reluctant caliph did by citing al-Nasir Muhammad’s youth as a reason he was unfit to rule. Lajin al-Mansuri, one of Khalil's assassins, was appointed naib. Growing more ambitious, he tried to make an attempt on sultan's life in 1296. Kitbugha survived, but fearing for his life, abdicated in favor of Lajin and retired to Syria. On 8 December 1296, Lajin publicly pledged allegiance to al-Hakim to formally inaugurate his reign. Like Khalil, Lajin continued to honor the caliph and put him in public eye. He was given a bigger financial emolument and a residential palace in the city, and would ride beside the sultan at official processions.

In 1298, the caliph made the pilgrimage to Mecca, and was gifted provisions and supplies by the sultan. In Mecca, a minor dispute arose when al-Hakim asked that the Friday sermon in the city’s mosques be delivered in his name. The sultans had done little to promote the caliph’s standing beyond Egypt. The sharif of Mecca, Abu Numayy, feeling threatened or resentful, he disparaged al-Hakim’s lineage by setting it against his own descent from the Prophet. He then recited his noble ancestry at length, while the elderly caliph failed to defend himself beyond a few verses praising the sharif’s lineage.

On 16 January 1299, Lajin was assassinated by rebel mamluks, who then recalled an-Nasir Muhammad from al-Karak and reinstalled him once again as a puppet while they vied for power. Al-Hakim, now even older, welcomed al-Nasir Muhammad back and invested him with sultanic authority for the second time. In November of the same year, the new sultan marched to Damascus, accompanied by al-Hakim, to confront an Ilkhanid invasion on Syria. From there, the army advanced to Homs where they suffered a crushing defeat near Wadi al-Khazindar, and Damascus briefly fell to the Mongols. Under the Ilkhan Ghazan, Islam had become the religion of the Mongol army and the elite, but this did nothing to improve relations with Cairo. Like his father, an-Nasir Muhammad referenced the caliph in his diplomatic correspondence with the Mongol ruler, warning the latter that "he who befriends the caliph is protected by God, and God will humiliate those who opposes the caliph or the ruler who elevates him".

=== Death ===
Soon after returning to Cairo from Damascus, al-Hakim fell gravely ill. He had earlier designated his son Ahmad as his heir, but the latter predeceased him. Two days before his death, the elderly caliph legally designated another son, Sulayman, as his successor. He died on 19 January 1302, aged between 70 and 80. After a massive procession through the city and funeral at the Ibn Tulun mosque, the first Abbasid caliph to be buried in Egypt was interred in the cemetry near the Sayyida Nafisa shrine, which henceforth became the traditional Abbasid burial ground in Cairo. His son Sulayman succeeded him as al-Mustakfi (I) billah.

== Bibliography ==
- Tritton, A. S. (1948). "The Tribes of Syria in the Fourteenth and Fifteenth Centuries". Bulletin of the School of Oriental and African Studies. 12 (3/4): 567–573. doi:10.1017/s0041977x00083129. JSTOR 608712. S2CID 161392172.
- Aigle, Denise (2015). The Mongol Empire Between Myth and Reality: Studies in Anthropological History. Iran Studies. Vol. 11. Leiden: Brill. ISBN 978-9-004-28064-9. ISSN 1569-7401.
- Amitai-Preiss, Reuven. Mongols and Mamluks: The Mamluk-Ilkhanid War 1260-1281. Cambridge: Cambridge University Press, 1995. Pp. 58–59, 61–63.
- Garcin, Jean-Claude (1967). "Histoire, opposition, politique et piétisme traditionaliste dans le Ḥusn al Muḥādarat de Suyûti" [History, opposition, politics and traditionalistic pietism in Suyuti's Ḥusn al Muḥādarat] (PDF). Annales Islamologiques (in French). 7. Institut Français d'Archéologie Orientale: 33–90. doi:10.3406/anisl.1967.909. S2CID 259055409. Archived from the original (PDF, 14.62 MB) on 2011-07-24.
- Glubb, John Bagot. Soldiers of Fortune: The Story of the Mamlukes. New York: Dorset Press, 1988. Pp. 77, 80, 171.
- Holt, P. M. (1984). "Some Observations on the 'Abbāsid Caliphate of Cairo". Bulletin of the School of Oriental and African Studies. 47 (3). University of London: 501–507. doi:10.1017/s0041977x00113710. JSTOR 618882. S2CID 161092185.
- Banister, Mustafa (2021). The Abbasid Caliphate of Cairo, 1261–1517: Out of the Shadows. Edinburgh: Edinburgh University Press. ISBN 9781474453363.
- Gibb, H. A. R.; et al., eds. (1960). The Encyclopaedia of Islam, New Edition, Volume I: A–B. Leiden: E. J. Brill. ISBN 9004081143.

Al-Hakim I Mamluk Abbasid dynasty Born: ? Died: 19 January 1302
Sunni Islam titles
Preceded by Al-Mustansir II	Caliph of Cairo; 16 November 1262 – 19 January 1302	Succeeded by Al-Mustakfi I
