= Isa ibn Musa =

Abbasid governor of Kufa (from 750–765)

Abbasid governor of Kufa
- In office 750–764
- Monarchs: al-Saffah, al-Mansur

Personal details
- Born: 721/2
- Died: 784
- Children: Ali; Musa; Isma'il; Dawud
- Parent: Musa ibn Muhammad al-Abbasi
- Relatives: Ibrahim al-Imam (uncle) al-Mansur (uncle) al-Saffah (uncle); Ja'far (cousin) al-Mahdi (cousin); Raitah (cousin)

ʿĪsā ibn Mūsā ibn Muḥammad ibn ʿAlī ibn ʿAbd Allāh ibn ʿal-ʿAbbās (Arabic: عيسى بن موسى بن محمد بن علي بن عبد الله بن العباس; c. 721/2–784) was a nephew of the first two Abbasid caliphs, al-Saffah (r. 750–754) and al-Mansur (r. 754–775). He served as governor of Kufa in Iraq for fifteen years and led the suppression of the Alid revolt of 762–763. From 754 on he was also heir-apparent of the Caliphate, until he was pressured to cede precedence to al-Mansur's son al-Mahdi (r. 775–785) in 764. With al-Mahdi's accession in 775, he was forced to renounce his rights entirely in 776 in favour of al-Hadi (r. 785–786), and retire to his palace at al-Ukhaidir Fortress, where he died in 784.

== Life ==
=== Career ===
Isa ibn Musa was born in AH 103 (721/2 CE). In summer 750, immediately after the end of the Abbasid Revolution, Isa was appointed by his uncle and first Abbasid caliph, al-Saffah, as governor of Kufa, the first seat of the Abbasid government. He would retain the post for fifteen years—according to Hugh N. Kennedy, the second longest tenure in the Abbasid period after that of Dawud ibn Yazid al-Muhallabi at Sind in the early 9th century.

In 754, as al-Saffah was nearing his death, and as his designated heir Abu Ja'far (who reigned as caliph al-Mansur) was on the Hajj pilgrimage in Mecca at the time, the Caliph appointed Isa, then about 34 years old, as the second heir, in the event anything should happen to Abu Ja'far. This move was necessary to prevent Abu Muslim, the powerful and popular commander who had initiated the Abbasid Revolution in Khurasan and had ruled the province since, from rising to the position of king-maker. Isa had already proven his ability as governor, and his proximity to the capital, al-Anbar, was crucial for a swift succession. When al-Saffah finally died, Isa proclaimed Abu Ja'far as Caliph and sent riders to notify him of his accession. According to the sources recorded by al-Tabari, Isa placed guards before the treasuries and government offices in the capital until the new caliph arrived there. He also sent al-Saffah's chamberlain, Abu Ghassan, to inform Abdallah ibn Ali in Syria of al-Saffah's death and receive the oath of allegiance (bay'ah) from him.

In the event that al-Saffah died on 8 June 754, Abu Muslim, who was on the pilgrimage together with al-Mansur, did not oppose the latter's accession, and readily swore the oath to him. It was Abdallah ibn Ali in Syria who rose in revolt instead, commandeering an army he had originally raised to campaign against the Byzantine Empire and marching with it into Iraq. The revolt was defeated by Abu Muslim, whereupon Isa intervened to grant Abd al-Samad ibn Ali, who alone among Abdallah's brothers had supported his revolt, a pardon. Isa had cordial relations with Abu Muslim, and was left unaware of al-Mansur's plot to kill the dangerously powerful ruler of Khurasan until after the deed was done. Under al-Mansur, Isa remained as governor of Kufa, and took actively part in the planning of the new Abbasid capital, Baghdad.

In 762–763, Isa led the army and suppressed the Alid revolts under the brothers Muhammad al-Nafs al-Zakiyya and Ibrahim ibn Abdallah. Muhammad's choice of Medina to raise his revolt was a potent symbol but a strategic error, as al-Mansur immediately realised. The Caliph sent Isa with 4,000 men against Muhammad. The Abbasid army easily cut the city off from outside support and quickly overran Muhammad's supporters, who numbered only about 300 men. Muhammad himself was killed, and Isa sent his head to Caliph al-Mansur. Muhammad's brother Ibrahim, who had chosen Basra as his base, was more successful, capturing Wasit, Fars, and Ahwaz, but failed to synchronise his revolt with the uprising of Medina. As a result, Isa was able to suppress Muhammad in Medina and then bring his forces against the Basra rebels. With some 15,000 men, Isa met some 10,000 rebels on 14 February 763 at Bakhamra. There the Alids initially gained the upper hand, but in the end Isa's perseverance brought the Abbasids victory.

=== Sidelining ===
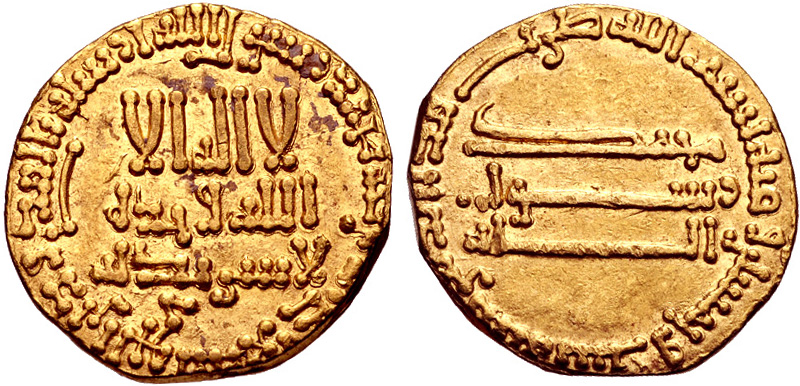
Gold dinar of al-Mansur

As soon as al-Mansur's position on the throne was secure, he began preparations for sidelining Isa from the succession in favour of his own son, Muhammad, the future al-Mahdi (r. 775–785). He was named heir after Isa in 758/9, and then appointed governor of Khurasan and the entire eastern caliphate in 759/60. This enabled him to establish close contacts with the vital Khurasani army, which had spearheaded the Abbasid Revolution. In time, Muhammad gained the fervent support of the Khurasanis, who in turn strongly opposed the succession of Isa. The reasons for this are not entirely clear, but Kennedy suggests that Isa may have been associated with the aristocratic gentry, the dehqan class, the overthrow of whose power had been one of the aims of the Abbasid Revolution.

Despite Isa's leading role in suppressing the Alid revolts, almost immediately the Caliph began applying pressure to accept the precedence of Muhammad as heir, while Isa would be relegated to heir of the much younger Muhammad, in effect disinherited. After Isa refused to comply, al-Mansur resorted to trickery: he entrusted Isa with watching over the defeated rebel Abdallah ibn Ali, and then secretly ordered Isa to execute him, aiming to pin responsibility for this on Isa and make him the object of the revenge of Abdallah's numerous and influential brothers. Isa was saved through the perspicacity of his secretary, who understood the caliphal trap, and prevented the secret order from being carried out. Thus, when called upon to present Abdallah to his brothers, Isa was able to expose the caliph's machinations.

In response, in 764 al-Mansur removed Isa from the governorship of Kufa, but his family remained influential in the city for decades to come: his son Musa held the governorship of Basra four times later in the century. Not only was Isa not given another office, but al-Mansur began to publicly berate and humiliate him, hoping to provoke a reaction. Isa retained his composure throughout, not rising to the caliph's bait. In the end, it was the intervention of the Khurasani soldiery, who made clear that they would not countenance Isa's succession, that forced him to back down; through the intercession of either Salm ibn Qutayba or Khalid ibn Barmak, Isa agreed to relinquish his place in the succession to Muhammad in exchange for an enormous sum of money. Isa nevertheless remained a threat to al-Mansur's rule: his dismissal is given as one of the reasons of the revolt of Ustadh Sis in Khurasan in 768, and as late as 770 some Khurasanis were arrested and brought to Baghdad for championing his cause. On his deathbed, al-Mansur is said to have remarked that he feared only two men, Isa ibn Musa and Isa, the son of Zayd ibn Ali.

=== Retirement and death ===
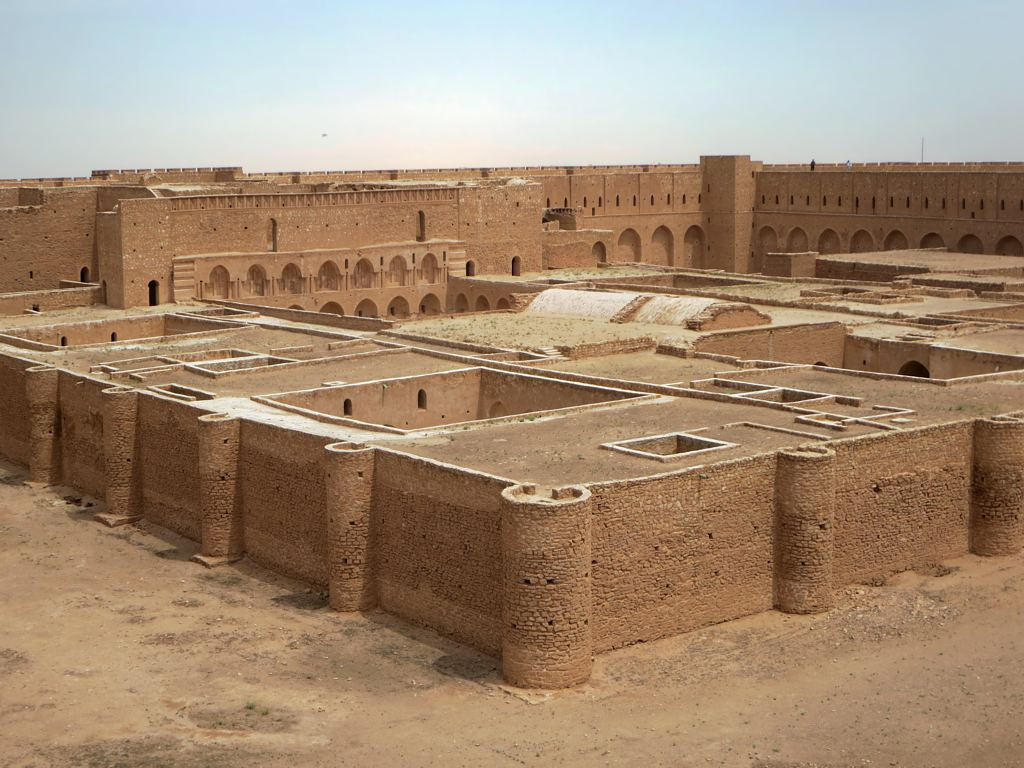
View of the al-Ukhaidir Fortress, built by Isa

In retirement, Isa built the al-Ukhaidir Fortress, a sprawling fortified palace that, in the words of Kennedy, "demonstrates to this day the power and wealth of the family". He spent most of his final years there as a semi-recluse, only leaving it to visit Kufa for the Eid al-Fitr and Eid al-Adha.

In 775, al-Mansur summoned Isa to take part, along with other members of the dynasty, in the Hajj, during which the caliph died. Upon al-Mansur's death his chamberlain, Rabi ibn Yunus, extracted the oath of allegiance from Isa and the caliph's entourage, before making al-Mansur's death public. While al-Mahdi's accession was unopposed, Isa was again the heir apparent, a situation that the Khurasani troops vehemently and vocally opposed. Al-Mahdi summoned him to Baghdad, but Isa refused, until soldiers took him prisoner at Kufa during Eid al-Adha in October 776. In the capital, he was faced with riots and demonstrations by the troops, who demanded that he abdicate his position entirely. In November he was obliged to witness the proclamation and oath-taking for al-Mahdi's son, Musa (the future al-Hadi, r. 785–786), as heir, and renounce his rights in public and in writing. He was compensated by another vast sum of money, some ten million silver dirhams, as well as estates in Upper Mesopotamia, but he was, as Kennedy writes, "a broken man". He retired from public life entirely until his death in June/July 784.

The genealogy of the Abbasids including their rival Zaydi imams

Abbasids

Caliphs of the Abbasid Caliphate
Caliphs of Cairo
Zaydi imams

ʿAbd al-Muṭṭalib
ibn ʿHāshīm

ʾAbū Ṭālib
ibn ʿAbd al-Muṭṭalib

Abū'l-Fādl
al-ʿAbbās ibn
ʿAbd al-Muṭṭalib

ʿAbd Allāh ibn
ʿAbd al-Muṭṭalib

ʿAlīyyū'l-Murtaḍžā
^{(1st Imām of Kaysāniyyā, Zaydīyyā, Imāmiyyā)}

Hibr al-Ummah
ʿAbd Allāh
ibn al-ʿAbbās

Khātam
al-Nabiyyin
Abū'l-Qāsīm
Muḥammad
ibn ʿAbd Allāh

Al-Ḥasan al-Mujtabā
^{(2nd Imām of Kaysāniyyā, Zaydīyyā, Imāmiyyā)}

Hussayn ibn Ali
^{(3rd Imām of Kaysāniyyā, Zaydīyyā, Imāmiyyā)}

Abū'l-Qāsīm Muḥammad
al-Hānafīyya
^{(4th Imām of Kaysāniyyā)}

ʿAlī ibn
ʿAbd Allāh
al-Sajjad

Al-Ḥasan al-Mu'thannā
^{(5th Imām of Zaydiyyā)}

Ali al-Sajjad
(Zayn al-ʿĀbidīn)
^{(4th Imām of Zaydiyyā, Imāmiyyā)}

Abū Hāshīm
ʿAbd Allāh ibn Muḥammad
^{(5th Imām of Hāsheemīyyā)}

Muḥammad
"al-Imām"
^{(6th Imām of Hāsheemīyyā)}
716/7 - 743

ʿAbd Allāh ibn ʿAlī
^{(Governor of Syria)}
750–754

Ṣāliḥ ibn ʿAlī
^{(Governor of Egypt)}
750–751

ʿAbd Allāh al-Kāmīl ibn al-Ḥasan al-Mu'thannā

Zayd ibn Ali
^{(6th Imām of Zaydiyyā)}

Ibrāhim (Ebrāheem)
"al-Imām"
^{(7th Imām of Hāsheemīyyā)}
743 - 749

Abū Jāʿfar
ʿAbd Allāh
al-Mānṣūr
^{(2)}
r. 754–775

Abū'l-ʿAbbās
ʿAbd Allāh
as-Saffāh
^{(1)}
r. 750–754

Mūsā ibn Muḥammad "al-Imām"

Nafsū'zZakiyya
^{(First elected caliph by Ibrāhim, Mānṣūr, Saffāh, Imām Mālīk & Abū Ḥanīfa)}
^{(8th Imām of Zaydiyyā)}

Yahya ibn Zayd
^{(7th Imām of Zaydiyyā)}

Abū Muslīm al-Khurāsānī
^{(Governor of Khurasan)}
748–755

Muḥammad
al-Mahdī
^{(3)}
r. 775–785

Jāʿfar
^{(Wali al-Ahd & Governor of Mosul)}
762–764

ʿĪsā ibn Mūsā
^{(Governor of Kufa)}
750–765

ʿAbd Allāh
Shāh Ghāzī
(ʿAbd Allāh ibn Muḥammad)
^{(10th Imām of Zaydiyyā)}

Ibrāhīm ibn ʿAbd Allāh al-Kāmīl ibn al-Ḥasan al-Mu'thannā
^{ibn Ḥasan al-Mujtabā}
^{(9th Imām of Zaydiyyā)}

Al-Ḥusayn ibn ʿAlī al-ʿĀbid ibn al-Ḥasan al-Mu'thallath
^{ibn Ḥasan al-Mu'thannā}
^{(12th Imām of Zaydiyyā)}

Hārūn
ar-Rāshīd
^{(5)}
r. 786–809

ʿMūsā
al-Hādī
^{(4)}
r. 785–786

^{(The Governors)}
- Mūsā ^{(Kufa, Egypt & Medina)}
- Ismā'īl
  ^{(Egypt)}
- Dā'wūd
^{(Medina)}

Sulaymān
^{ibn ʿAbd Allāh al-Kāmīl ibn al-Ḥasan II}
^{(Emir of Tlemcen)}
^{(Sulaymanid dynasty of Western Algeria)}

Yaḥyā
^{ibn ʿAbd Allāh al-Kāmīl ibn al-Ḥasan al-Mu'thannā}
^{(14th Imām of Zaydiyyā)}

Ibrāhīm Ṭabāṭabā
^{ibn Ismāʿīl al-Dībādj ibn Ibrāhīm al-Ghamr ibn
al-Ḥasan al-Mu'thannā}

Muḥammad
al-Mu'tasim
^{(8)}
r. 833–842

Abd Allāh
al-Ma'mun
^{(7)}
r. 813–833

Muḥammad
al-Amin
^{(6)}
r. 809–813

Sūlaymān
^{ibn ʿAbd Allāh as-Sālih ibn Mūsā al-Jawn ibn ʿAbd Allāh al-Kāmīl ibn al-Ḥasan al-Mu'thannā}

Idrīs the Elder ibn ʿAbd Allāh
^{(Idrisid dynasty of Morocco)}
^{(15th Imām of Zaydiyyā)}

Muḥammad ibn IbrāhīmṬabāṭabā
^{(16th Imām of Zaydiyyā)}

Jāʿfar al-Mutawakkil
^{(10)}
r. 847–861

Muḥammad ibn Muḥammad
al-Mu'tasim

Hārūn
al-Wathiq
^{(9)}
r. 842–847

Mūsā II
^{ibn ʿAbd Allāh as-Sâlih ibn Mūsā al-Jawn ibn ʿAbd Allāh al-Kāmīl}

Idrīs ibn Idrīs
^{(2nd Zaydī Imām of Idrisids in Morocco)}

Muḥammad
al-Muntasir
^{(11)}
r. 861–862

Ṭalḥa al-Muwaffaq
^{(Regent)}
870–891

Aḥmad
al-Musta'in
^{(12)}
r. 862–866

Muḥammad
al-Muhtadi
^{(14)}
r. 869–870

Ismāʿīl ibn Yūsūf
Al-Ukhayḍhir
^{ibn Ibrāhīm ibn Mūsā al-Jawn ibn ʿAbd Allāh al-Kāmīl ibn Ḥasan al-Mu'thannā}

Al-Qāsīm
ar-Rassī ibn IbrāhīmṬabāṭabā
^{(19th Imām of Zaydiyyā)}

Ibrahim al-Mu'ayyad
^{(Wali al-Ahd & Governor of Syria)}
850–861

Aḥmad
al-Mu'tadid
^{(16)}
r. 892–902

Muḥammad
al-Mu'tazz
^{(13)}
r. 866–869

Aḥmad
al-Mu'tamid
^{(15)}
r. 870–892

Muḥammad ibn Yūsūf
Al-Ukhayḍhir
^{(1st Zaydī Imām of Ukhaydhirites in Najd and Al-Yamama)}

^{Abūʾl-Ḥusayn
Al-Hādī ilāʾl-Ḥaqq}
Yaḥyā ibn
al-Ḥusayn
^{(1st Zaydī Imām of Rassids in Yemen)}

ʿAlī
al-Muktafī
^{(17)}
r. 902–908

Jāʿfar
al-Muqtadir
^{(18)}
r. 908–929,
929–932

Muḥammad
al-Qāhir
^{(19)}
r. 929, 932–934

Jāʿfar al-Mufawwid
^{(Wali al-Ahd)}
875–892

Zayd ibn al-Ḥasan al-Mujtabā ibn ʿAlī ibn Abī Ṭālib

ʿAbd Allāh
al-Mustakfī
^{(22)}
r. 944–946

Al-Faḍl
al-Mutīʿ
^{(23)}
r. 946–974

Ishāq ibn Jāʿfar al-Muqtadir

Muḥammad
al-Rādī
^{(20)}
r. 934–940

Ībrāhīm
al-Muttaqī
^{(21)}
r. 940–944

Ḥasan ibn Zayd ibn al-Ḥasan al-Mujtabā ibn ʿAlīyyū'l-Murtaḍžā

ʿUmar al-Ashraf ibn ʿAlī Zayn al-ʿĀbidīn ibn al-Ḥusayn

ʿAbd al-Karīm
al-Ṭāʾiʿ
^{(24)}
r. 974–991

Aḥmad
al-Qāʿdīr
^{(25)}
r. 991–1031

Ismāʿīl ibn Ḥasan ibn Zayd ibn al-Ḥasan al-Mujtabā

ʿAlī ibn ʿUmar al-Ashraf ibn ʿAlī Zayn al-ʿĀbidīn

Al-Ḥusayn Dhu'l-Dam'a ibn Zayd ibn ʿAlī Zayn al-ʿĀbidīn

ʿAbd Allāh
al-Qāʿīm
^{(26)}
r. 1031–1075

Muḥammad ibn Ismāʿīl ibn Ḥasan ibn Zayd

Al-Ḥasan ibn ʿAlī ibn ʿUmar al-Ashraf

Yaḥyā ibn al-Ḥusayn Dhu'l-Dam'a ibn Zayd

Muḥammad Dhakīrat ad-Dīn
^{(Wali al-Ahd)}
1039–1056

Zayd ibn Muḥammad ibn Ismāʿīl ibn Ḥasan

ʿAlī ibn al-Ḥasan ibn ʿAlī ibn ʿUmar al-Ashraf

ʿUmar ibn Yaḥyā ibn al-Ḥusayn Dhu'l-Dam'a

ʿAbd Allāh
al-Mūqtādī
^{(27)}
r. 1075–1094

^{Al-Dāʿī al-Kabīr}
Hasan ibn Zayd
^{(1st Zaydī Imām of Zaydīds in Tabaristan)}

^{Al-Dāʿī al-Ṣaghīr}
Muhammad ibn Zayd
^{(2nd Zaydī Imām of Zaydīds in Tabaristan)}

Yaḥyā ibn ʿUmar
^{(20th Imām of Zaydiyyā in Samarra)}

Aḥmad
al-Mūstāzhīr
^{(28)}
r. 1094–1118

^{Al-Nāṣir liʾl-Ḥāqq}
Hasan al-Utrush
^{(3rd Zaydī Imām of Zaydīds in Tabaristan)}

Al-Faḍl al-Mūstārshīd
^{(29)}
r. 1118–1135

Al-Mānṣūr
al-Rāshīd
^{(30)}
r. 1135–1136

Muḥammad
al-Mūqtāfī
^{(31)}
r. 1136–1160

Alī ibn al-Faḍl
al-Qabī

Yūsuf
al-Mūstānjīd
^{(32)}
r. 1160–1170

al-Hāsān
ibn Alī

Al-Hāssān
al-Mūstādī'
^{(33)}
r. 1170–1180

Abū Bakr
ibn al-Hāsān

Aḥmad
al-Nāsīr
^{(34)}
r. 1180–1225

Abi 'Alī al-Hāsān ibn Abū Bakr

Muḥammad
az-Zāhīr
^{(35)}
r. 1225–1226

Malīka'zZāhīr Rūkn ad-Dīn Baybars
^{(Mamluk Sultanate Sultan of Egypt)}
r. 1260–1277

Al-Mānsūr
al-Mūstānsīr
^{(36)}
r. 1226–1242

Abū'l-Qāsim Aḥmad
al-Mūstānsīr
^{(1)}
r. 1261

Abū'l-ʿAbbās Aḥmad
al-Hakim I
^{(2)}
r. 1262–1302

ʿAbd Allāh
al-Mūstā'sīm
^{(37)}
r. 1242–1258

Abū'r-Rabīʿ Sulaymān
al-Mustakfī I
^{(3)}
r. 1302–1340

Aḥmad ibn Aḥmad
al-Ḥākim bi-amr Allāh

Abū'l-ʿAbbās Aḥmad
al-Hakim II
^{(5)}
r. 1341–1352

Abū'l-Fatḥ Abū Bakr
al-Mu'tadid I
^{(6)}
r. 1352–1362

Abū Isḥāq Ibrāhīm
al-Wāṯiq I
^{(4)}
r. 1340–1341

Abū ʿAbd Allāh Muḥammad
al-Mutawakkil I
^{(7)}
r. 1362–1377,
1377–1383,
1389–1406

Abū Yāḥyā Zakariyāʾ
al-Musta'sim
^{(8)}
r. 1377,
1386–1389

Abū Ḥafs ʿUmar
al-Wāṯiq II
^{(9)}
r. 1383–1386

Abū'l-Faḍl al-ʿAbbās
al-Musta'īn
^{(10)}
r. 1406–1414
Sultan of Egypt
r. 1412

Abū'l-Fatḥ Dāwud
al-Mu'tadīd II
^{(11)}
r. 1414–1441

Abū'r-Rabīʿ Sulaymān
al-Mustakfī II
^{(12)}
r. 1441–1451

Yaʿqūb ibn Muḥammad
al-Mutawakkil ʿalā'Llāh

Abū'l-Baqāʾ Ḥamza
al-Qāʾim
^{(13)}
r. 1451–1455

Abū'l-Maḥāsin Yūsuf
al-Mustanjid
^{(14)}
r. 1455–1479

Abū'l-ʿIzz ʿAbd al-ʿAzīz
al-Mutawakkil II
^{(15)}
r. 1479–1497

Abū'ṣ-Ṣabr Yaʿqūb
al-Mustamsik
^{(16)}
r. 1497–1508,
1516–1517

Muḥammad
al-Mutawakkil III
^{(17)}
r. 1508–1516,
1517

== Sources ==
- Kennedy, Hugh (1981). The Early Abbasid Caliphate: A Political History. London: Croom Helm. ISBN 0389200182.
- McAuliffe, Jane Dammen, ed. (1995). The History of al-Ṭabarī, Volume XXVIII: The ʿAbbāsid Authority Affirmed: The Early Years of al-Mansūr, A.D. 753–763/A.H. 136–145. SUNY Series in Near Eastern Studies. Albany, New York: State University of New York Press. ISBN 978-0-7914-1895-6.
- Sourdel, D. (1978). "ʿĪsā b. Mūsā". In van Donzel, E.; Lewis, B.; Pellat, Ch. & Bosworth, C. E. (eds.). The Encyclopaedia of Islam, Second Edition. Volume IV: Iran–Kha. Leiden: E. J. Brill. p. 88. OCLC 758278456.
