= Al-Qasim al-Rassi =

9th-century Zaydi Shia imam

Al-Qāsim ibn Ibrāhīm Ṭabāṭabā ibn Ismāʿīl al-Dībādj ibn Ibrāhīm al-Ghamr ibn al-Ḥasan al-Muthannā ibn al-Ḥasan ibn ʿAlī ibn Abī Ṭālib ar-Rassī (Arabic: القاسم بن ابراهيم بن اسماعيل بن ابراهيم بن الحسن بن الحسن بن علي بن أبي طالب الرسي; 785–860) was a 9th-century religious leader in the Arabian Peninsula. He was one of the founders of the theological traditions of the Zaydi branch of Shi'a Islam, and is considered as an imam by the Zaydis. His grandson Yahya founded the Rassid dynasty of Zaydi imams of Yemen.

== Life ==
Qasim was a descendant of al-Hasan, a son of Ali ibn Abu Talib, the son-in-law of Muhammad and first Shi'a imam. Qasim was a great-grandson of al-Hasan's grandson, Ibrahim al-Shibh. He was born and grew up in Medina, being taught Zaydi doctrine, the hadiths, and possibly the Quran and Arabic as well, by Abu Bakr Abd al-Hamid ibn Abi Uways, a nephew of the famed jurist Malik ibn Anas.

Qasim came to be recognized as one of the chief authorities of the Zaydi school of Shi'a Islam, and was honoured with the titles "Star of the Family of the Prophet of God" (Najm Āl Rasūl Allāh) and "Interpreter of the Faith" (Turjumān al-Dīn). His brother Muhammad, known as Ibn Tabataba, was recognized as imam, and raised a failed rebellion against the Abbasid Caliphate at Kufa in 814.

Qasim himself moved to Egypt sometime before 815, and probably settled at Fustat, the capital of Egypt. One later source claims that he was sent there by his brother, but this is unlikely, especially as Qasim objected to some of Ibn Tabataba's theological views. During his stay in Egypt, he studied Christian and Jewish theological writings, and debated both Muslim and non-Muslim scholars. A treatise refuting Christian theological views and another against a Manichaean treatise attributed to the scholar Ibn al-Muqaffa', were written during his stay in Egypt. At the same time, he was influenced by Christian views on God, and especially on free will.

Eventually, Qasim himself was widely acknowledged as an imam, receiving pledges of allegiance from various communities from the Hejaz, Iraq and Persia, but given the failure of his brother's uprising and similar Shi'a revolts in the past, he refrained from proclaiming himself in public or rising in revolt against the Abbasids. Instead, after coming under suspicion from the Abbasid authorities, in c. 827 he moved his family from Egypt to a village (likely modern al-Dur or Dur Abi al-Qasim, some 57 kilometres (35 mi) southwest of Medina) near the wadi al-Rass, whence he received his nisba of "al-Rassi". He spent the remainder of his life there, engaged in writing, and in teaching Zaydi faithful who came to visit him.

Qasim died in 860, a year after the birth of his grandson Yahya, who went on to found a line of Zaydi imams in Yemen that lasted into the 20th century, most of whom were descended from Qasim.

== Teachings ==
Qasim summarized his teachings in five "pillars" (uṣūl), which echoed and revised those of the Mu'tazilite doctrine:

1. In his views on God, the Christian influence is evident, as Qasim emphasized, according to Wilferd Madelung, the "total dissimilarity (khilāf) of God to all creation", and regarded "the essential generosity (jūd) and goodness of God" as the chief divine attributes, while ignoring the Mu'tazilite distinction between divine essence and God's acts.
2. Following from the previous, Qasim's conception of divine justice (ʿadl) "strictly dissociated God from evil acts and affirmed human free will", in the words of Madelung. He explicitly rejected the Mu'tazilite concept of "compensation" (ʿiwāḍ) for the sufferings inflicted during one's life, especially since—another borrowing from Christian theology—the blessings conferred by God far outweighed any sufferings inflicted, just or unjust. On the issue of predestination, he followed a cautious middle road between the Mu'tazilite rejection of the concept, and the traditional Zaydi doctrine supporting it.
3. Consequent to his ideas on divine justice, Qasim affirmed the inevitability of the "promise and threat" (waʿd wa waʿīdī) of God, namely the reward of believers and the punishment of sinners in the afterlife.
4. In a distinction with Mu'tazilite thought, Qasim firmly upheld the Zaydi doctrine that considered acts of injustice and oppression as a form of unbelief (kufr), even though they were not outright idolatry (shirk). Hence Muslim oppressors were to be regarded as outright unbelievers, and not merely sinful Muslims; this point in the Zaydi doctrine justified fighting against even Muslim rulers and their supporters if they were considered as oppressive. Qasim considered the Muslim rulers of his time as illegitimate tyrants, and the lands they ruled as "abode of injustice" (dār al-ẓulm), meaning that it was the duty of every faithful Muslim to emigrate (hijra, cf. also dār al-hijra) from their lands.
5. According to Qasim, the Quran was at the centre of all religious matters: accepting the Quran as "detailed, unambiguous and free of contradiction" (Madelung), he rejected claims by the Imami Shi'a (Twelver and Isma'ili) that some parts had been lost or altered. On the thorny issue of Quranic createdness, he avoided taking sides explicitly, although his theological positions imply that he leaned to the Mu'tazilite opinion that it was created, rather than the overwhelming contemporary Zaydi (and Sunni) view that it was not. At the same time, Qasim fiercely criticized the admission of un-Quranic ḥadīth as legitimate sunnah, and accused the Sunni traditionalists of forging ḥadīth and contributing to the oppressive regimes of the Muslim rulers of his time.

On the attributes required for claiming the imamate according to Zaydi doctrine, Qasim stressed the religious qualifications of the candidate over the traditional requirement to lead an armed revolt. He rejected the first three Rashidun caliphs as illegitimate, and held Ali ibn Abi Talib as the only legitimate successor of Muhammad. He accepted the fifth Imami imam, Muhammad al-Baqir (d. c. 733), but not his successors, whom he considered, in the words of Madelung, as "worldly exploiters of their pious followers".

His doctrines became the foundation for the religious and legal systems of the Zaydi states in Tabaristan and Yemen, but were heavily amended by his grandson Yahya to a more mainstream Shi'a and Mu'tazilite direction.

The genealogy of the Abbasids including their rival Zaydi imams

Abbasids

Caliphs of the Abbasid Caliphate
Caliphs of Cairo
Zaydi imams

ʿAbd al-Muṭṭalib ibn ʿHāshīm
ʾAbū Ṭālib ibn ʿAbd al-Muṭṭalib	Abū'l-Fādl al-ʿAbbās ibn ʿAbd al-Muṭṭalib	ʿAbd Allāh ibn ʿAbd al-Muṭṭalib
ʿAlīyyū'l-Murtaḍžā^{(1st Imām of Kaysāniyyā, Zaydīyyā, Imāmiyyā)}	Hibr al-Ummah ʿAbd Allāh ibn al-ʿAbbās	Khātam al-Nabiyyin; Abū'l-Qāsīm; Muḥammad ibn ʿAbd Allāh
Al-Ḥasan al-Mujtabā^{(2nd Imām of Kaysāniyyā, Zaydīyyā, Imāmiyyā)}	Hussayn ibn Ali^{(3rd Imām of Kaysāniyyā, Zaydīyyā, Imāmiyyā)}	Abū'l-Qāsīm Muḥammad al-Hānafīyya^{(4th Imām of Kaysāniyyā)}	ʿAlī ibn ʿAbd Allāh al-Sajjad
Al-Ḥasan al-Mu'thannā^{(5th Imām of Zaydiyyā)}	Ali al-Sajjad (Zayn al-ʿĀbidīn)^{(4th Imām of Zaydiyyā, Imāmiyyā)}	Abū Hāshīm ʿAbd Allāh ibn Muḥammad^{(5th Imām of Hāsheemīyyā)}	Muḥammad "al-Imām"^{(6th Imām of Hāsheemīyyā)} 716/7 - 743	^{(The Governors)}: ʿAbd Allāh ibn ʿAlī ^{(Bilad al-Sham of Syria; 750–754)}; Abd al-Sāmad ^{(Medina and Mecca; 772–776 & Jazira; 780)}	^{(The Governors)}: Ṣāliḥ ibn ʿAlī ^{(Egypt; 750–751)}; Sulayman ^{(Bahrayn, Oman, Tigris districts, Mihrajanqadhaq; 750–755 & Amir al-hajj; 753)}
ʿAbd Allāh al-Kāmīl ibn al-Ḥasan al-Mu'thannā	Zayd ibn Ali^{(6th Imām of Zaydiyyā)}	Ibrāhim (Ebrāheem) "al-Imām"^{(7th Imām of Hāsheemīyyā)} 743 - 749	Abū Jāʿfar ʿAbd Allāh al-Mānṣūr^{(2)} r. 754–775	Abū'l-ʿAbbās ʿAbd Allāh as-Saffāh^{(1)} r. 750–754	Mūsā ibn Muḥammad "al-Imām"
Nafsū'zZakiyya^{(First elected caliph by Ibrāhim, Mānṣūr, Saffāh, Imām Mālīk & Abū Ḥanīfa)}^{(8th Imām of Zaydiyyā)}	Yahya ibn Zayd^{(7th Imām of Zaydiyyā)}	Abū Muslīm al-Khurāsānī^{(Governor of Khurasan)} 748–755	Muḥammad al-Mahdī^{(3)} r. 775–785	Jāʿfar^{(Wali al-Ahd & Governor of Mosul)} 762–764	ʿĪsā ibn Mūsā^{(Governor of Kufa)} 750–765
ʿAbd Allāh; Shāh Ghāzī (ʿAbd Allāh ibn Muḥammad)^{(10th Imām of Zaydiyyā)}	Ibrāhīm ibn ʿAbd Allāh al-Kāmīl ibn al-Ḥasan al-Mu'thannā^{ibn Ḥasan al-Mujtabā}^{(9th Imām of Zaydiyyā)}	Al-Ḥusayn ibn ʿAlī al-ʿĀbid ibn al-Ḥasan al-Mu'thallath^{ibn Ḥasan al-Mu'thannā}^{(12th Imām of Zaydiyyā)}	Hārūn ar-Rāshīd^{(5)} r. 786–809	ʿMūsā al-Hādī^{(4)} r. 785–786	^{(The Governors)}: Mūsā ^{(Kufa, Egypt & Medina)}; Ismā'īl ^{(Egypt)}; Dā'wūd^{(Medina)}
Sulaymān^{ibn ʿAbd Allāh al-Kāmīl ibn al-Ḥasan II}^{(Emir of Tlemcen)}^{(Sulaymanid dynasty of Western Algeria)}	Yaḥyā^{ibn ʿAbd Allāh al-Kāmīl ibn al-Ḥasan al-Mu'thannā}^{(14th Imām of Zaydiyyā)}	Ibrāhīm Ṭabāṭabā^{ibn Ismāʿīl al-Dībādj ibn Ibrāhīm al-Ghamr ibn al-Ḥasan al-Mu'thannā}	Muḥammad al-Mu'tasim^{(8)} r. 833–842	Abd Allāh al-Ma'mun^{(7)} r. 813–833	Muḥammad al-Amin^{(6)} r. 809–813
Sūlaymān^{ibn ʿAbd Allāh as-Sālih ibn Mūsā al-Jawn ibn ʿAbd Allāh al-Kāmīl ibn al-Ḥasan al-Mu'thannā}	Idrīs the Elder ibn ʿAbd Allāh^{(Idrisid dynasty of Morocco)}^{(15th Imām of Zaydiyyā)}	Muḥammad ibn IbrāhīmṬabāṭabā^{(16th Imām of Zaydiyyā)}	Jāʿfar al-Mutawakkil^{(10)} r. 847–861	Muḥammad ibn Muḥammad al-Mu'tasim	Hārūn al-Wathiq^{(9)} r. 842–847
Mūsā II^{ibn ʿAbd Allāh as-Sâlih ibn Mūsā al-Jawn ibn ʿAbd Allāh al-Kāmīl}	Idrīs ibn Idrīs^{(2nd Zaydī Imām of Idrisids in Morocco)}	Muḥammad al-Muntasir^{(11)} r. 861–862	Ṭalḥa al-Muwaffaq^{(Regent)} 870–891	Aḥmad al-Musta'in^{(12)} r. 862–866	Muḥammad al-Muhtadi^{(14)} r. 869–870
Ismāʿīl ibn Yūsūf; Al-Ukhayḍhir^{ibn Ibrāhīm ibn Mūsā al-Jawn ibn ʿAbd Allāh al-Kāmīl ibn Ḥasan al-Mu'thannā}	Al-Qāsīm ar-Rassī ibn IbrāhīmṬabāṭabā^{(19th Imām of Zaydiyyā)}	Ibrahim al-Mu'ayyad^{(Wali al-Ahd & Governor of Syria)} 850–861	Aḥmad al-Mu'tadid^{(16)} r. 892–902	Muḥammad al-Mu'tazz^{(13)} r. 866–869	Aḥmad al-Mu'tamid^{(15)} r. 870–892
Muḥammad ibn Yūsūf; Al-Ukhayḍhir^{(1st Zaydī Imām of Ukhaydhirites in Najd and Al-Yamama)}	^{Abūʾl-Ḥusayn; Al-Hādī ilāʾl-Ḥaqq} Yaḥyā ibn al-Ḥusayn^{(1st Zaydī Imām of Rassids in Yemen)}	ʿAlī al-Muktafī^{(17)} r. 902–908	Jāʿfar al-Muqtadir^{(18)} r. 908–929, 929–932	Muḥammad al-Qāhir^{(19)} r. 929, 932–934	Jāʿfar al-Mufawwid^{(Wali al-Ahd)} 875–892
Zayd ibn al-Ḥasan al-Mujtabā ibn ʿAlī ibn Abī Ṭālib	ʿAbd Allāh al-Mustakfī^{(22)} r. 944–946	Al-Faḍl al-Mutīʿ^{(23)} r. 946–974	Ishāq ibn Jāʿfar al-Muqtadir	Muḥammad al-Rādī^{(20)} r. 934–940	Ībrāhīm al-Muttaqī^{(21)} r. 940–944
Ḥasan ibn Zayd ibn al-Ḥasan al-Mujtabā ibn ʿAlīyyū'l-Murtaḍžā	ʿUmar al-Ashraf ibn ʿAlī Zayn al-ʿĀbidīn ibn al-Ḥusayn	ʿAbd al-Karīm al-Ṭāʾiʿ^{(24)} r. 974–991	Aḥmad al-Qāʿdīr^{(25)} r. 991–1031
Ismāʿīl ibn Ḥasan ibn Zayd ibn al-Ḥasan al-Mujtabā	ʿAlī ibn ʿUmar al-Ashraf ibn ʿAlī Zayn al-ʿĀbidīn	Al-Ḥusayn Dhu'l-Dam'a ibn Zayd ibn ʿAlī Zayn al-ʿĀbidīn	ʿAbd Allāh al-Qāʿīm^{(26)} r. 1031–1075
Muḥammad ibn Ismāʿīl ibn Ḥasan ibn Zayd	Al-Ḥasan ibn ʿAlī ibn ʿUmar al-Ashraf	Yaḥyā ibn al-Ḥusayn Dhu'l-Dam'a ibn Zayd	Muḥammad Dhakīrat ad-Dīn^{(Wali al-Ahd)} 1039–1056
Zayd ibn Muḥammad ibn Ismāʿīl ibn Ḥasan	ʿAlī ibn al-Ḥasan ibn ʿAlī ibn ʿUmar al-Ashraf	ʿUmar ibn Yaḥyā ibn al-Ḥusayn Dhu'l-Dam'a	ʿAbd Allāh al-Mūqtādī^{(27)} r. 1075–1094
^{Al-Dāʿī al-Kabīr} Hasan ibn Zayd^{(1st Zaydī Imām of Zaydīds in Tabaristan)}	^{Al-Dāʿī al-Ṣaghīr} Muhammad ibn Zayd^{(2nd Zaydī Imām of Zaydīds in Tabaristan)}	Yaḥyā ibn ʿUmar^{(20th Imām of Zaydiyyā in Samarra)}	Aḥmad al-Mūstāzhīr^{(28)} r. 1094–1118
^{Al-Nāṣir liʾl-Ḥāqq} Hasan al-Utrush^{(3rd Zaydī Imām of Zaydīds in Tabaristan)}	Al-Faḍl al-Mūstārshīd^{(29)} r. 1118–1135
Al-Mānṣūr al-Rāshīd^{(30)} r. 1135–1136
Muḥammad al-Mūqtāfī^{(31)} r. 1136–1160	Alī ibn al-Faḍl al-Qabī
Yūsuf al-Mūstānjīd^{(32)} r. 1160–1170	al-Hāsān ibn Alī
Al-Hāssān al-Mūstādī'^{(33)} r. 1170–1180	Abū Bakr ibn al-Hāsān
Aḥmad al-Nāsīr^{(34)} r. 1180–1225	Abi 'Alī al-Hāsān ibn Abū Bakr
Muḥammad az-Zāhīr^{(35)} r. 1225–1226	Malīka'zZāhīr Rūkn ad-Dīn Baybars^{(Mamluk Sultanate Sultan of Egypt)} r. 1260–1277
Al-Mānsūr al-Mūstānsīr^{(36)} r. 1226–1242	Abū'l-Qāsim Aḥmad al-Mūstānsīr^{(1)} r. 1261	Abū'l-ʿAbbās Aḥmad al-Hakim I^{(2)} r. 1262–1302
ʿAbd Allāh al-Mūstā'sīm^{(37)} r. 1242–1258	Abū'r-Rabīʿ Sulaymān al-Mustakfī I^{(3)} r. 1302–1340	Aḥmad ibn Aḥmad al-Ḥākim bi-amr Allāh
Abū'l-ʿAbbās Aḥmad al-Hakim II^{(5)} r. 1341–1352	Abū'l-Fatḥ Abū Bakr al-Mu'tadid I^{(6)} r. 1352–1362	Abū Isḥāq Ibrāhīm al-Wāṯiq I^{(4)} r. 1340–1341
Abū ʿAbd Allāh Muḥammad al-Mutawakkil I^{(7)} r. 1362–1377, 1377–1383, 1389–1406	Abū Yāḥyā Zakariyāʾ al-Musta'sim^{(8)} r. 1377, 1386–1389	Abū Ḥafs ʿUmar al-Wāṯiq II^{(9)} r. 1383–1386
Abū'l-Faḍl al-ʿAbbās al-Musta'īn^{(10)} r. 1406–1414; Sultan of Egypt r. 1412	Abū'l-Fatḥ Dāwud al-Mu'tadīd II^{(11)} r. 1414–1441	Abū'r-Rabīʿ Sulaymān al-Mustakfī II^{(12)} r. 1441–1451	Yaʿqūb ibn Muḥammad al-Mutawakkil ʿalā'Llāh	Abū'l-Baqāʾ Ḥamza al-Qāʾim^{(13)} r. 1451–1455	Abū'l-Maḥāsin Yūsuf al-Mustanjid^{(14)} r. 1455–1479
Abū'l-ʿIzz ʿAbd al-ʿAzīz al-Mutawakkil II^{(15)} r. 1479–1497
Abū'ṣ-Ṣabr Yaʿqūb al-Mustamsik^{(16)} r. 1497–1508, 1516–1517
Muḥammad al-Mutawakkil III^{(17)} r. 1508–1516, 1517

== See also ==
- Ahmad ibn Isa ibn Zayd

== Sources ==
- Eagle, A. B. D. R. (1994). "Al-Hādī Yahyā b. al-Husayn b. al-Qāsim (245–98/859–911): A Biographical Introduction and the Background and Significance of his Imamate". New Arabian Studies. 2: 103–122. ISSN 1351-4709.
- Madelung, W. (1995). "al-Rassī". In Bosworth, C. E.; van Donzel, E.; Heinrichs, W. P. & Lecomte, G. (eds.). The Encyclopaedia of Islam, Second Edition. Volume VIII: Ned–Sam. Leiden: E. J. Brill. pp. 453–454. ISBN 978-90-04-09834-3.
