= Musa ibn Isa ibn Musa al-Hashimi =

Provincial Abbasid governor

Musa ibn Isa ibn Musa al-Hashimi موسى بن عيسى بن موسى الهاشمي

Governor of Kufa
- In office 783–785/786
- Monarchs: Al-Mahdi, Three or four separate tenures under Harun al-Rashid

Governor of Mecca and Medina
- In office 790s–790s
- Monarch: Harun al-Rashid
- Preceded by: Muhammad ibn Abdallah al-Raba'i
- Succeeded by: Ibrahim ibn Muhammad ibn Ibrahim

Amir al-Hajj
- In office 797–797
- Monarch: Harun al-Rashid
- In office 799–799
- Monarch: Harun al-Rashid

Governor of Egypt
- In office 787 – 789 (first term)
- Monarch: Hārun al-Rashīd
- Preceded by: Ali ibn Sulayman
- Succeeded by: Maslama ibn Yahya
- In office 791 – 792 (second term)
- Monarch: Harun al-Rashid
- Preceded by: Dawud ibn Yazid
- Succeeded by: Ibrahim ibn Salih
- In office 795 – 796 (third term)
- Monarch: Harun al-Rashid
- Preceded by: Ubaydallah ibn al-Mahdi
- Succeeded by: Ubaydallah ibn al-Mahdi

Governor of Syria
- In office 792–793
- Monarch: Harun al-Rashid
- Preceded by: Ibrahim ibn Salih
- Succeeded by: Musa ibn Yahya

Governor of Arminiya
- In office 794–795
- Monarch: Hārun al-Rashīd
- Preceded by: Al-Abbas ibn Jarir ibn Yazid al-Bajali
- Succeeded by: Yahya ibn Sa'id al-Harashi

Personal details
- Born: c. 746 Umayyad Caliphate
- Died: c. 799, 803 or 805
- Spouse: Ulayya bint al-Mahdi
- Relations: Abbasid dynasty
- Children: Al-Abbas; Ishaq
- Parent: Isa ibn Musa ibn Muhammad ibn Ali ibn Abdallah ibn al-Abbās (father)
- Relatives: Ali (brother); Isma'il (brother); Dawud (brother)
- Military career
- Conflicts: Battle of Fakhkh

Mūsā ibn ʿĪsā ibn Mūsā al-Hāshimī (Arabic: موسى بن عيسى بن موسى بن محمد بن علي بن عبد الله بن العباس) was an 8th-century AD Abbasid prince. The son of Isa ibn Musa, he was posted to various governorships throughout his career, including Kufa, Egypt, Damascus, Mecca, Medina, and Arminiya, and was a leading commander at the Battle of Fakhkh.

== Career ==
=== Background and succession dispute ===
Musa was born (according to one account, in c. 746) to Isa ibn Musa, a member of the Banu al-Abbas who served as a long-running governor of Kufa during the first years of the Abbasid Caliphate. An extended relation of the Abbasid dynasty, Musa was a great-nephew of its first two caliphs al-Saffah (r. 750–754) and al-Mansur (r. 754–775); he was also connected to the ruling line by his marriage to Ulayya, daughter of the third caliph al-Mahdi.

Under the succession arrangements made by al-Saffah in 754, Musa's father Isa was originally the designated second heir-apparent to the caliphate after al-Saffah's brother al-Mansur; in 764/5, however, Isa was pressured by al-Mansur into yielding his rights and recognizing the caliph's son al-Mahdi's claims to the throne ahead of his own. According to some versions of this event, Musa feared that al-Mansur would have his father killed if he refused to step aside; he therefore worked together with the caliph and helped to convince Isa to withdraw from the succession.

=== Under al-Mahdi and al-Hadi ===
During the reign of al-Mahdi (r. 775–785) Isa ibn Musa was permanently stripped of his succession rights to the caliphate, but aside from this Musa and his family appear to have remained in good standing. In 780 he escorted the future caliph Harun al-Rashid on an expedition against the Byzantine Empire, and following the death of Isa in 783 he was given the governorship of his father's old power base of Kufa.

In 786, Musa was one of the Abbasid commanders who successfully put down a pro-Alid rebellion in Mecca at the Battle of Fakhkh, with he and al-Abbas ibn Muhammad ibn Ali leading the left wing of the army during the fighting. Despite having played a prominent role in the victory, he afterwards received criticism for his decision to execute al-Hasan ibn Muhammad, a son of Muhammad al-Nafs al-Zakiyya who had participated in the revolt. As punishment for failing to keep al-Hasan alive for judgement, the caliph al-Hadi (r. 785–786) ordered that Musa's goods and properties be confiscated, and they remained under sequestration until al-Hadi's death later that year.

=== Under Harun al-Rashid ===
Musa was particularly active following the accession of his second cousin Harun al-Rashid (r. 786–809), who appointed him to a slew of positions in the early part of his reign. During this period he was again placed in charge of Kufa on three or four separate occasions, and was also appointed governor of Mecca and Medina (and, according to some sources, the Yemen). In 797 and 799, he served as the leader of the pilgrimage in Mecca.

Under Harun Musa had three stints as governor of Egypt, in 787–789, 791–792, and 795–796. During his first governorship he reversed the anti-Christian edicts of his predecessor Ali ibn Sulayman al-Hashimi and allowed the Copts to rebuild the churches that Ali had ordered destroyed. His time in Egypt was otherwise relatively uneventful, although his second governorship was brought to an end after Harun received complaints about his conduct in the province.

In 793, Musa was appointed as governor of Damascus. Upon his arrival in Syria he undertook a monthlong expedition in the Hauran in an unsuccessful effort to hunt down the Qaysi Abu al-Haydham, who had raised the standard of rebellion a few months prior. After subsequent further attempts to kill or capture Abu Haydham likewise ended in failure, Musa was recalled by the caliph and he departed from the region, leaving Abd al-Salam ibn Humayd to manage affairs in his stead.

In 794, Musa was made governor of Arminiya, which had recently been pacified following an extensive campaign undertaken by the central government to defeat several ongoing rebel movements. He remained in the province for a year before a fresh outbreak of unrest caused the region to once again fall into turmoil; as a result he was dismissed and replaced with Yahya al-Harashi.

=== Death ===
Various dates are given for Musa's death, including 799 (at the age of 55), 803, and 805.

The genealogy of the Abbasids including their rival Zaydi imams

Abbasids

Caliphs of the Abbasid Caliphate
Caliphs of Cairo
Zaydi imams

ʿAbd al-Muṭṭalib
ibn ʿHāshīm

ʾAbū Ṭālib
ibn ʿAbd al-Muṭṭalib

Abū'l-Fādl
al-ʿAbbās ibn
ʿAbd al-Muṭṭalib

ʿAbd Allāh ibn
ʿAbd al-Muṭṭalib

ʿAlīyyū'l-Murtaḍžā
^{(1st Imām of Kaysāniyyā, Zaydīyyā, Imāmiyyā)}

Hibr al-Ummah
ʿAbd Allāh
ibn al-ʿAbbās

Khātam
al-Nabiyyin
Abū'l-Qāsīm
Muḥammad
ibn ʿAbd Allāh

Al-Ḥasan al-Mujtabā
^{(2nd Imām of Kaysāniyyā, Zaydīyyā, Imāmiyyā)}

Hussayn ibn Ali
^{(3rd Imām of Kaysāniyyā, Zaydīyyā, Imāmiyyā)}

Abū'l-Qāsīm Muḥammad
al-Hānafīyya
^{(4th Imām of Kaysāniyyā)}

ʿAlī ibn
ʿAbd Allāh
al-Sajjad

Al-Ḥasan al-Mu'thannā
^{(5th Imām of Zaydiyyā)}

Ali al-Sajjad
(Zayn al-ʿĀbidīn)
^{(4th Imām of Zaydiyyā, Imāmiyyā)}

Abū Hāshīm
ʿAbd Allāh ibn Muḥammad
^{(5th Imām of Hāsheemīyyā)}

Muḥammad
"al-Imām"
^{(6th Imām of Hāsheemīyyā)}
716/7 - 743

ʿAbd Allāh ibn ʿAlī
^{(Governor of Syria)}
750–754

Ṣāliḥ ibn ʿAlī
^{(Governor of Egypt)}
750–751

ʿAbd Allāh al-Kāmīl ibn al-Ḥasan al-Mu'thannā

Zayd ibn Ali
^{(6th Imām of Zaydiyyā)}

Ibrāhim (Ebrāheem)
"al-Imām"
^{(7th Imām of Hāsheemīyyā)}
743 - 749

Abū Jāʿfar
ʿAbd Allāh
al-Mānṣūr
^{(2)}
r. 754–775

Abū'l-ʿAbbās
ʿAbd Allāh
as-Saffāh
^{(1)}
r. 750–754

Mūsā ibn Muḥammad "al-Imām"

Nafsū'zZakiyya
^{(First elected caliph by Ibrāhim, Mānṣūr, Saffāh, Imām Mālīk & Abū Ḥanīfa)}
^{(8th Imām of Zaydiyyā)}

Yahya ibn Zayd
^{(7th Imām of Zaydiyyā)}

Abū Muslīm al-Khurāsānī
^{(Governor of Khurasan)}
748–755

Muḥammad
al-Mahdī
^{(3)}
r. 775–785

Jāʿfar
^{(Wali al-Ahd & Governor of Mosul)}
762–764

ʿĪsā ibn Mūsā
^{(Governor of Kufa)}
750–765

ʿAbd Allāh
Shāh Ghāzī
(ʿAbd Allāh ibn Muḥammad)
^{(10th Imām of Zaydiyyā)}

Ibrāhīm ibn ʿAbd Allāh al-Kāmīl ibn al-Ḥasan al-Mu'thannā
^{ibn Ḥasan al-Mujtabā}
^{(9th Imām of Zaydiyyā)}

Al-Ḥusayn ibn ʿAlī al-ʿĀbid ibn al-Ḥasan al-Mu'thallath
^{ibn Ḥasan al-Mu'thannā}
^{(12th Imām of Zaydiyyā)}

Hārūn
ar-Rāshīd
^{(5)}
r. 786–809

ʿMūsā
al-Hādī
^{(4)}
r. 785–786

^{(The Governors)}
- Mūsā ^{(Kufa, Egypt & Medina)}
- Ismā'īl
  ^{(Egypt)}
- Dā'wūd
^{(Medina)}

Sulaymān
^{ibn ʿAbd Allāh al-Kāmīl ibn al-Ḥasan II}
^{(Emir of Tlemcen)}
^{(Sulaymanid dynasty of Western Algeria)}

Yaḥyā
^{ibn ʿAbd Allāh al-Kāmīl ibn al-Ḥasan al-Mu'thannā}
^{(14th Imām of Zaydiyyā)}

Ibrāhīm Ṭabāṭabā
^{ibn Ismāʿīl al-Dībādj ibn Ibrāhīm al-Ghamr ibn
al-Ḥasan al-Mu'thannā}

Muḥammad
al-Mu'tasim
^{(8)}
r. 833–842

Abd Allāh
al-Ma'mun
^{(7)}
r. 813–833

Muḥammad
al-Amin
^{(6)}
r. 809–813

Sūlaymān
^{ibn ʿAbd Allāh as-Sālih ibn Mūsā al-Jawn ibn ʿAbd Allāh al-Kāmīl ibn al-Ḥasan al-Mu'thannā}

Idrīs the Elder ibn ʿAbd Allāh
^{(Idrisid dynasty of Morocco)}
^{(15th Imām of Zaydiyyā)}

Muḥammad ibn IbrāhīmṬabāṭabā
^{(16th Imām of Zaydiyyā)}

Jāʿfar al-Mutawakkil
^{(10)}
r. 847–861

Muḥammad ibn Muḥammad
al-Mu'tasim

Hārūn
al-Wathiq
^{(9)}
r. 842–847

Mūsā II
^{ibn ʿAbd Allāh as-Sâlih ibn Mūsā al-Jawn ibn ʿAbd Allāh al-Kāmīl}

Idrīs ibn Idrīs
^{(2nd Zaydī Imām of Idrisids in Morocco)}

Muḥammad
al-Muntasir
^{(11)}
r. 861–862

Ṭalḥa al-Muwaffaq
^{(Regent)}
870–891

Aḥmad
al-Musta'in
^{(12)}
r. 862–866

Muḥammad
al-Muhtadi
^{(14)}
r. 869–870

Ismāʿīl ibn Yūsūf
Al-Ukhayḍhir
^{ibn Ibrāhīm ibn Mūsā al-Jawn ibn ʿAbd Allāh al-Kāmīl ibn Ḥasan al-Mu'thannā}

Al-Qāsīm
ar-Rassī ibn IbrāhīmṬabāṭabā
^{(19th Imām of Zaydiyyā)}

Ibrahim al-Mu'ayyad
^{(Wali al-Ahd & Governor of Syria)}
850–861

Aḥmad
al-Mu'tadid
^{(16)}
r. 892–902

Muḥammad
al-Mu'tazz
^{(13)}
r. 866–869

Aḥmad
al-Mu'tamid
^{(15)}
r. 870–892

Muḥammad ibn Yūsūf
Al-Ukhayḍhir
^{(1st Zaydī Imām of Ukhaydhirites in Najd and Al-Yamama)}

^{Abūʾl-Ḥusayn
Al-Hādī ilāʾl-Ḥaqq}
Yaḥyā ibn
al-Ḥusayn
^{(1st Zaydī Imām of Rassids in Yemen)}

ʿAlī
al-Muktafī
^{(17)}
r. 902–908

Jāʿfar
al-Muqtadir
^{(18)}
r. 908–929,
929–932

Muḥammad
al-Qāhir
^{(19)}
r. 929, 932–934

Jāʿfar al-Mufawwid
^{(Wali al-Ahd)}
875–892

Zayd ibn al-Ḥasan al-Mujtabā ibn ʿAlī ibn Abī Ṭālib

ʿAbd Allāh
al-Mustakfī
^{(22)}
r. 944–946

Al-Faḍl
al-Mutīʿ
^{(23)}
r. 946–974

Ishāq ibn Jāʿfar al-Muqtadir

Muḥammad
al-Rādī
^{(20)}
r. 934–940

Ībrāhīm
al-Muttaqī
^{(21)}
r. 940–944

Ḥasan ibn Zayd ibn al-Ḥasan al-Mujtabā ibn ʿAlīyyū'l-Murtaḍžā

ʿUmar al-Ashraf ibn ʿAlī Zayn al-ʿĀbidīn ibn al-Ḥusayn

ʿAbd al-Karīm
al-Ṭāʾiʿ
^{(24)}
r. 974–991

Aḥmad
al-Qāʿdīr
^{(25)}
r. 991–1031

Ismāʿīl ibn Ḥasan ibn Zayd ibn al-Ḥasan al-Mujtabā

ʿAlī ibn ʿUmar al-Ashraf ibn ʿAlī Zayn al-ʿĀbidīn

Al-Ḥusayn Dhu'l-Dam'a ibn Zayd ibn ʿAlī Zayn al-ʿĀbidīn

ʿAbd Allāh
al-Qāʿīm
^{(26)}
r. 1031–1075

Muḥammad ibn Ismāʿīl ibn Ḥasan ibn Zayd

Al-Ḥasan ibn ʿAlī ibn ʿUmar al-Ashraf

Yaḥyā ibn al-Ḥusayn Dhu'l-Dam'a ibn Zayd

Muḥammad Dhakīrat ad-Dīn
^{(Wali al-Ahd)}
1039–1056

Zayd ibn Muḥammad ibn Ismāʿīl ibn Ḥasan

ʿAlī ibn al-Ḥasan ibn ʿAlī ibn ʿUmar al-Ashraf

ʿUmar ibn Yaḥyā ibn al-Ḥusayn Dhu'l-Dam'a

ʿAbd Allāh
al-Mūqtādī
^{(27)}
r. 1075–1094

^{Al-Dāʿī al-Kabīr}
Hasan ibn Zayd
^{(1st Zaydī Imām of Zaydīds in Tabaristan)}

^{Al-Dāʿī al-Ṣaghīr}
Muhammad ibn Zayd
^{(2nd Zaydī Imām of Zaydīds in Tabaristan)}

Yaḥyā ibn ʿUmar
^{(20th Imām of Zaydiyyā in Samarra)}

Aḥmad
al-Mūstāzhīr
^{(28)}
r. 1094–1118

^{Al-Nāṣir liʾl-Ḥāqq}
Hasan al-Utrush
^{(3rd Zaydī Imām of Zaydīds in Tabaristan)}

Al-Faḍl al-Mūstārshīd
^{(29)}
r. 1118–1135

Al-Mānṣūr
al-Rāshīd
^{(30)}
r. 1135–1136

Muḥammad
al-Mūqtāfī
^{(31)}
r. 1136–1160

Alī ibn al-Faḍl
al-Qabī

Yūsuf
al-Mūstānjīd
^{(32)}
r. 1160–1170

al-Hāsān
ibn Alī

Al-Hāssān
al-Mūstādī'
^{(33)}
r. 1170–1180

Abū Bakr
ibn al-Hāsān

Aḥmad
al-Nāsīr
^{(34)}
r. 1180–1225

Abi 'Alī al-Hāsān ibn Abū Bakr

Muḥammad
az-Zāhīr
^{(35)}
r. 1225–1226

Malīka'zZāhīr Rūkn ad-Dīn Baybars
^{(Mamluk Sultanate Sultan of Egypt)}
r. 1260–1277

Al-Mānsūr
al-Mūstānsīr
^{(36)}
r. 1226–1242

Abū'l-Qāsim Aḥmad
al-Mūstānsīr
^{(1)}
r. 1261

Abū'l-ʿAbbās Aḥmad
al-Hakim I
^{(2)}
r. 1262–1302

ʿAbd Allāh
al-Mūstā'sīm
^{(37)}
r. 1242–1258

Abū'r-Rabīʿ Sulaymān
al-Mustakfī I
^{(3)}
r. 1302–1340

Aḥmad ibn Aḥmad
al-Ḥākim bi-amr Allāh

Abū'l-ʿAbbās Aḥmad
al-Hakim II
^{(5)}
r. 1341–1352

Abū'l-Fatḥ Abū Bakr
al-Mu'tadid I
^{(6)}
r. 1352–1362

Abū Isḥāq Ibrāhīm
al-Wāṯiq I
^{(4)}
r. 1340–1341

Abū ʿAbd Allāh Muḥammad
al-Mutawakkil I
^{(7)}
r. 1362–1377,
1377–1383,
1389–1406

Abū Yāḥyā Zakariyāʾ
al-Musta'sim
^{(8)}
r. 1377,
1386–1389

Abū Ḥafs ʿUmar
al-Wāṯiq II
^{(9)}
r. 1383–1386

Abū'l-Faḍl al-ʿAbbās
al-Musta'īn
^{(10)}
r. 1406–1414
Sultan of Egypt
r. 1412

Abū'l-Fatḥ Dāwud
al-Mu'tadīd II
^{(11)}
r. 1414–1441

Abū'r-Rabīʿ Sulaymān
al-Mustakfī II
^{(12)}
r. 1441–1451

Yaʿqūb ibn Muḥammad
al-Mutawakkil ʿalā'Llāh

Abū'l-Baqāʾ Ḥamza
al-Qāʾim
^{(13)}
r. 1451–1455

Abū'l-Maḥāsin Yūsuf
al-Mustanjid
^{(14)}
r. 1455–1479

Abū'l-ʿIzz ʿAbd al-ʿAzīz
al-Mutawakkil II
^{(15)}
r. 1479–1497

Abū'ṣ-Ṣabr Yaʿqūb
al-Mustamsik
^{(16)}
r. 1497–1508,
1516–1517

Muḥammad
al-Mutawakkil III
^{(17)}
r. 1508–1516,
1517

== Notes ==
Preceded by Ubaydallah ibn al-Mahdi	Governor of Egypt; 795–796	Succeeded by Ubaydallah ibn al-Mahdi
Preceded by Dawud ibn Yazid ibn Hatim al-Muhallabi	Governor of Egypt; 791–792	Succeeded by Ibrahim ibn Salih
Preceded by Ali ibn Sulayman ibn Ali al-Hashimi	Governor of Egypt; 787–789	Succeeded by Maslama ibn Yahya al-Bajali
