= Al-Mutawakkil III =

17th Abbasid caliph in Cairo (1508 – 1517)

17th Caliph of Cairo
- 1st period: 1508–1516
- Predecessor: Al-Mustamsik
- Successor: Al-Mustamsik
- 2nd period: 22 January 1517
- Predecessor: Al-Mustamsik
- Successor: Selim I as the (Ottoman caliph)
- Born: Unknown; Mamluk Sultanate
- Died: 1543; Constantinople, Ottoman Empire
- Father: Al-Mustamsik
- Religion: Sunni Islam

Al-Mutawakkil III (Arabic: المتوكل على الله الثالث; fl. 1508–1543) was the seventeenth Abbasid caliph of Cairo for the Mamluk Sultanate from 1508 to 1516, and again in 1517.

== Life ==
He was the last caliph of the later Egyptian-based Caliphate. Since the Mongol sack of Baghdad and the execution of Caliph Al-Musta'sim in 1258, these Cairene Caliphs had resided in Cairo as nominal rulers used to legitimize the actual rule of the Mamluk sultans.

Al-Mutawakkil III was deposed briefly in 1516 by his predecessor Al-Mustamsik, but was restored to the office the following year. In 1517, Ottoman Sultan Selim I had managed to defeat the Mamluk Sultanate and made Egypt part of the Ottoman Empire. Al-Mutawakkil III was captured together with his family and transported to Constantinople.

According to traditional history, at this time he formally surrendered the title of caliph as well as its outward emblems—the sword and mantle of Muhammad—to Ottoman sultan Selim I. This story does not appear in the literature until the 1780s and was advanced to bolster the claims of caliphal jurisdiction over Muslims outside of the empire, as asserted in the 1774 Treaty of Küçük Kaynarca.

The genealogy of the Abbasids including their rival Zaydi imams

Abbasids

Caliphs of the Abbasid Caliphate
Caliphs of Cairo
Zaydi imams

ʿAbd al-Muṭṭalib ibn ʿHāshīm
ʾAbū Ṭālib ibn ʿAbd al-Muṭṭalib	Abū'l-Fādl al-ʿAbbās ibn ʿAbd al-Muṭṭalib	ʿAbd Allāh ibn ʿAbd al-Muṭṭalib
ʿAlīyyū'l-Murtaḍžā^{(1st Imām of Kaysāniyyā, Zaydīyyā, Imāmiyyā)}	Hibr al-Ummah ʿAbd Allāh ibn al-ʿAbbās	Khātam al-Nabiyyin; Abū'l-Qāsīm; Muḥammad ibn ʿAbd Allāh
Al-Ḥasan al-Mujtabā^{(2nd Imām of Kaysāniyyā, Zaydīyyā, Imāmiyyā)}	Hussayn ibn Ali^{(3rd Imām of Kaysāniyyā, Zaydīyyā, Imāmiyyā)}	Abū'l-Qāsīm Muḥammad al-Hānafīyya^{(4th Imām of Kaysāniyyā)}	ʿAlī ibn ʿAbd Allāh al-Sajjad
Al-Ḥasan al-Mu'thannā^{(5th Imām of Zaydiyyā)}	Ali al-Sajjad (Zayn al-ʿĀbidīn)^{(4th Imām of Zaydiyyā, Imāmiyyā)}	Abū Hāshīm ʿAbd Allāh ibn Muḥammad^{(5th Imām of Hāsheemīyyā)}	Muḥammad "al-Imām"^{(6th Imām of Hāsheemīyyā)} 716/7 - 743	^{(The Governors)}: ʿAbd Allāh ibn ʿAlī ^{(Bilad al-Sham of Syria; 750–754)}; Abd al-Sāmad ^{(Medina and Mecca; 772–776 & Jazira; 780)}	^{(The Governors)}: Ṣāliḥ ibn ʿAlī ^{(Egypt; 750–751)}; Sulayman ^{(Bahrayn, Oman, Tigris districts, Mihrajanqadhaq; 750–755 & Amir al-hajj; 753)}
ʿAbd Allāh al-Kāmīl ibn al-Ḥasan al-Mu'thannā	Zayd ibn Ali^{(6th Imām of Zaydiyyā)}	Ibrāhim (Ebrāheem) "al-Imām"^{(7th Imām of Hāsheemīyyā)} 743 - 749	Abū Jāʿfar ʿAbd Allāh al-Mānṣūr^{(2)} r. 754–775	Abū'l-ʿAbbās ʿAbd Allāh as-Saffāh^{(1)} r. 750–754	Mūsā ibn Muḥammad "al-Imām"
Nafsū'zZakiyya^{(First elected caliph by Ibrāhim, Mānṣūr, Saffāh, Imām Mālīk & Abū Ḥanīfa)}^{(8th Imām of Zaydiyyā)}	Yahya ibn Zayd^{(7th Imām of Zaydiyyā)}	Abū Muslīm al-Khurāsānī^{(Governor of Khurasan)} 748–755	Muḥammad al-Mahdī^{(3)} r. 775–785	Jāʿfar^{(Wali al-Ahd & Governor of Mosul)} 762–764	ʿĪsā ibn Mūsā^{(Governor of Kufa)} 750–765
ʿAbd Allāh; Shāh Ghāzī (ʿAbd Allāh ibn Muḥammad)^{(10th Imām of Zaydiyyā)}	Ibrāhīm ibn ʿAbd Allāh al-Kāmīl ibn al-Ḥasan al-Mu'thannā^{ibn Ḥasan al-Mujtabā}^{(9th Imām of Zaydiyyā)}	Al-Ḥusayn ibn ʿAlī al-ʿĀbid ibn al-Ḥasan al-Mu'thallath^{ibn Ḥasan al-Mu'thannā}^{(12th Imām of Zaydiyyā)}	Hārūn ar-Rāshīd^{(5)} r. 786–809	ʿMūsā al-Hādī^{(4)} r. 785–786	^{(The Governors)}: Mūsā ^{(Kufa, Egypt & Medina)}; Ismā'īl ^{(Egypt)}; Dā'wūd^{(Medina)}
Sulaymān^{ibn ʿAbd Allāh al-Kāmīl ibn al-Ḥasan II}^{(Emir of Tlemcen)}^{(Sulaymanid dynasty of Western Algeria)}	Yaḥyā^{ibn ʿAbd Allāh al-Kāmīl ibn al-Ḥasan al-Mu'thannā}^{(14th Imām of Zaydiyyā)}	Ibrāhīm Ṭabāṭabā^{ibn Ismāʿīl al-Dībādj ibn Ibrāhīm al-Ghamr ibn al-Ḥasan al-Mu'thannā}	Muḥammad al-Mu'tasim^{(8)} r. 833–842	Abd Allāh al-Ma'mun^{(7)} r. 813–833	Muḥammad al-Amin^{(6)} r. 809–813
Sūlaymān^{ibn ʿAbd Allāh as-Sālih ibn Mūsā al-Jawn ibn ʿAbd Allāh al-Kāmīl ibn al-Ḥasan al-Mu'thannā}	Idrīs the Elder ibn ʿAbd Allāh^{(Idrisid dynasty of Morocco)}^{(15th Imām of Zaydiyyā)}	Muḥammad ibn IbrāhīmṬabāṭabā^{(16th Imām of Zaydiyyā)}	Jāʿfar al-Mutawakkil^{(10)} r. 847–861	Muḥammad ibn Muḥammad al-Mu'tasim	Hārūn al-Wathiq^{(9)} r. 842–847
Mūsā II^{ibn ʿAbd Allāh as-Sâlih ibn Mūsā al-Jawn ibn ʿAbd Allāh al-Kāmīl}	Idrīs ibn Idrīs^{(2nd Zaydī Imām of Idrisids in Morocco)}	Muḥammad al-Muntasir^{(11)} r. 861–862	Ṭalḥa al-Muwaffaq^{(Regent)} 870–891	Aḥmad al-Musta'in^{(12)} r. 862–866	Muḥammad al-Muhtadi^{(14)} r. 869–870
Ismāʿīl ibn Yūsūf; Al-Ukhayḍhir^{ibn Ibrāhīm ibn Mūsā al-Jawn ibn ʿAbd Allāh al-Kāmīl ibn Ḥasan al-Mu'thannā}	Al-Qāsīm ar-Rassī ibn IbrāhīmṬabāṭabā^{(19th Imām of Zaydiyyā)}	Ibrahim al-Mu'ayyad^{(Wali al-Ahd & Governor of Syria)} 850–861	Aḥmad al-Mu'tadid^{(16)} r. 892–902	Muḥammad al-Mu'tazz^{(13)} r. 866–869	Aḥmad al-Mu'tamid^{(15)} r. 870–892
Muḥammad ibn Yūsūf; Al-Ukhayḍhir^{(1st Zaydī Imām of Ukhaydhirites in Najd and Al-Yamama)}	^{Abūʾl-Ḥusayn; Al-Hādī ilāʾl-Ḥaqq} Yaḥyā ibn al-Ḥusayn^{(1st Zaydī Imām of Rassids in Yemen)}	ʿAlī al-Muktafī^{(17)} r. 902–908	Jāʿfar al-Muqtadir^{(18)} r. 908–929, 929–932	Muḥammad al-Qāhir^{(19)} r. 929, 932–934	Jāʿfar al-Mufawwid^{(Wali al-Ahd)} 875–892
Zayd ibn al-Ḥasan al-Mujtabā ibn ʿAlī ibn Abī Ṭālib	ʿAbd Allāh al-Mustakfī^{(22)} r. 944–946	Al-Faḍl al-Mutīʿ^{(23)} r. 946–974	Ishāq ibn Jāʿfar al-Muqtadir	Muḥammad al-Rādī^{(20)} r. 934–940	Ībrāhīm al-Muttaqī^{(21)} r. 940–944
Ḥasan ibn Zayd ibn al-Ḥasan al-Mujtabā ibn ʿAlīyyū'l-Murtaḍžā	ʿUmar al-Ashraf ibn ʿAlī Zayn al-ʿĀbidīn ibn al-Ḥusayn	ʿAbd al-Karīm al-Ṭāʾiʿ^{(24)} r. 974–991	Aḥmad al-Qāʿdīr^{(25)} r. 991–1031
Ismāʿīl ibn Ḥasan ibn Zayd ibn al-Ḥasan al-Mujtabā	ʿAlī ibn ʿUmar al-Ashraf ibn ʿAlī Zayn al-ʿĀbidīn	Al-Ḥusayn Dhu'l-Dam'a ibn Zayd ibn ʿAlī Zayn al-ʿĀbidīn	ʿAbd Allāh al-Qāʿīm^{(26)} r. 1031–1075
Muḥammad ibn Ismāʿīl ibn Ḥasan ibn Zayd	Al-Ḥasan ibn ʿAlī ibn ʿUmar al-Ashraf	Yaḥyā ibn al-Ḥusayn Dhu'l-Dam'a ibn Zayd	Muḥammad Dhakīrat ad-Dīn^{(Wali al-Ahd)} 1039–1056
Zayd ibn Muḥammad ibn Ismāʿīl ibn Ḥasan	ʿAlī ibn al-Ḥasan ibn ʿAlī ibn ʿUmar al-Ashraf	ʿUmar ibn Yaḥyā ibn al-Ḥusayn Dhu'l-Dam'a	ʿAbd Allāh al-Mūqtādī^{(27)} r. 1075–1094
^{Al-Dāʿī al-Kabīr} Hasan ibn Zayd^{(1st Zaydī Imām of Zaydīds in Tabaristan)}	^{Al-Dāʿī al-Ṣaghīr} Muhammad ibn Zayd^{(2nd Zaydī Imām of Zaydīds in Tabaristan)}	Yaḥyā ibn ʿUmar^{(20th Imām of Zaydiyyā in Samarra)}	Aḥmad al-Mūstāzhīr^{(28)} r. 1094–1118
^{Al-Nāṣir liʾl-Ḥāqq} Hasan al-Utrush^{(3rd Zaydī Imām of Zaydīds in Tabaristan)}	Al-Faḍl al-Mūstārshīd^{(29)} r. 1118–1135
Al-Mānṣūr al-Rāshīd^{(30)} r. 1135–1136
Muḥammad al-Mūqtāfī^{(31)} r. 1136–1160	Alī ibn al-Faḍl al-Qabī
Yūsuf al-Mūstānjīd^{(32)} r. 1160–1170	al-Hāsān ibn Alī
Al-Hāssān al-Mūstādī'^{(33)} r. 1170–1180	Abū Bakr ibn al-Hāsān
Aḥmad al-Nāsīr^{(34)} r. 1180–1225	Abi 'Alī al-Hāsān ibn Abū Bakr
Muḥammad az-Zāhīr^{(35)} r. 1225–1226	Malīka'zZāhīr Rūkn ad-Dīn Baybars^{(Mamluk Sultanate Sultan of Egypt)} r. 1260–1277
Al-Mānsūr al-Mūstānsīr^{(36)} r. 1226–1242	Abū'l-Qāsim Aḥmad al-Mūstānsīr^{(1)} r. 1261	Abū'l-ʿAbbās Aḥmad al-Hakim I^{(2)} r. 1262–1302
ʿAbd Allāh al-Mūstā'sīm^{(37)} r. 1242–1258	Abū'r-Rabīʿ Sulaymān al-Mustakfī I^{(3)} r. 1302–1340	Aḥmad ibn Aḥmad al-Ḥākim bi-amr Allāh
Abū'l-ʿAbbās Aḥmad al-Hakim II^{(5)} r. 1341–1352	Abū'l-Fatḥ Abū Bakr al-Mu'tadid I^{(6)} r. 1352–1362	Abū Isḥāq Ibrāhīm al-Wāṯiq I^{(4)} r. 1340–1341
Abū ʿAbd Allāh Muḥammad al-Mutawakkil I^{(7)} r. 1362–1377, 1377–1383, 1389–1406	Abū Yāḥyā Zakariyāʾ al-Musta'sim^{(8)} r. 1377, 1386–1389	Abū Ḥafs ʿUmar al-Wāṯiq II^{(9)} r. 1383–1386
Abū'l-Faḍl al-ʿAbbās al-Musta'īn^{(10)} r. 1406–1414; Sultan of Egypt r. 1412	Abū'l-Fatḥ Dāwud al-Mu'tadīd II^{(11)} r. 1414–1441	Abū'r-Rabīʿ Sulaymān al-Mustakfī II^{(12)} r. 1441–1451	Yaʿqūb ibn Muḥammad al-Mutawakkil ʿalā'Llāh	Abū'l-Baqāʾ Ḥamza al-Qāʾim^{(13)} r. 1451–1455	Abū'l-Maḥāsin Yūsuf al-Mustanjid^{(14)} r. 1455–1479
Abū'l-ʿIzz ʿAbd al-ʿAzīz al-Mutawakkil II^{(15)} r. 1479–1497
Abū'ṣ-Ṣabr Yaʿqūb al-Mustamsik^{(16)} r. 1497–1508, 1516–1517
Muḥammad al-Mutawakkil III^{(17)} r. 1508–1516, 1517

== Bibliography ==
- "Biography of Al-Mutawakkil III" (in Arabic). Islampedia.com. Archived from the original on 2008-06-11.
- Garcin, Jean-Claude (1967). "Histoire, opposition, politique et piétisme traditionaliste dans le Ḥusn al Muḥādarat de Suyûti" [History, opposition, politics and traditionalistic pietism in Suyuti's Ḥusn al Muḥādarat] (PDF). Annales Islamologiques (in French). 7. Institut Français d'Archéologie Orientale: 33–90. doi:10.3406/anisl.1967.909. S2CID 259055409. Archived from the original (PDF, 14.62 MB) on 2011-07-24.
- Holt, P. M. (1984). "Some Observations on the 'Abbāsid Caliphate of Cairo". Bulletin of the School of Oriental and African Studies. 47 (3). University of London: 501–507. doi:10.1017/s0041977x00113710. JSTOR 618882. S2CID 161092185.

Al-Mutawakkil III Mamluk Abbasid dynasty Born: ? Died: 1543
Sunni Islam titles
Preceded by Al-Mustamsik	Caliph of Cairo; 1508–1516	Succeeded by Al-Mustamsik
Preceded by Al-Mustamsik	Caliph of Cairo; 1517	Vacant Caliphate surrendered to Selim I
