= Al-Ukhaidir Fortress =

Ancient fortress built in Iraq

- حصن الأخيضر
- Karbala Governorate, Iraq; Near Karbala in Iraq
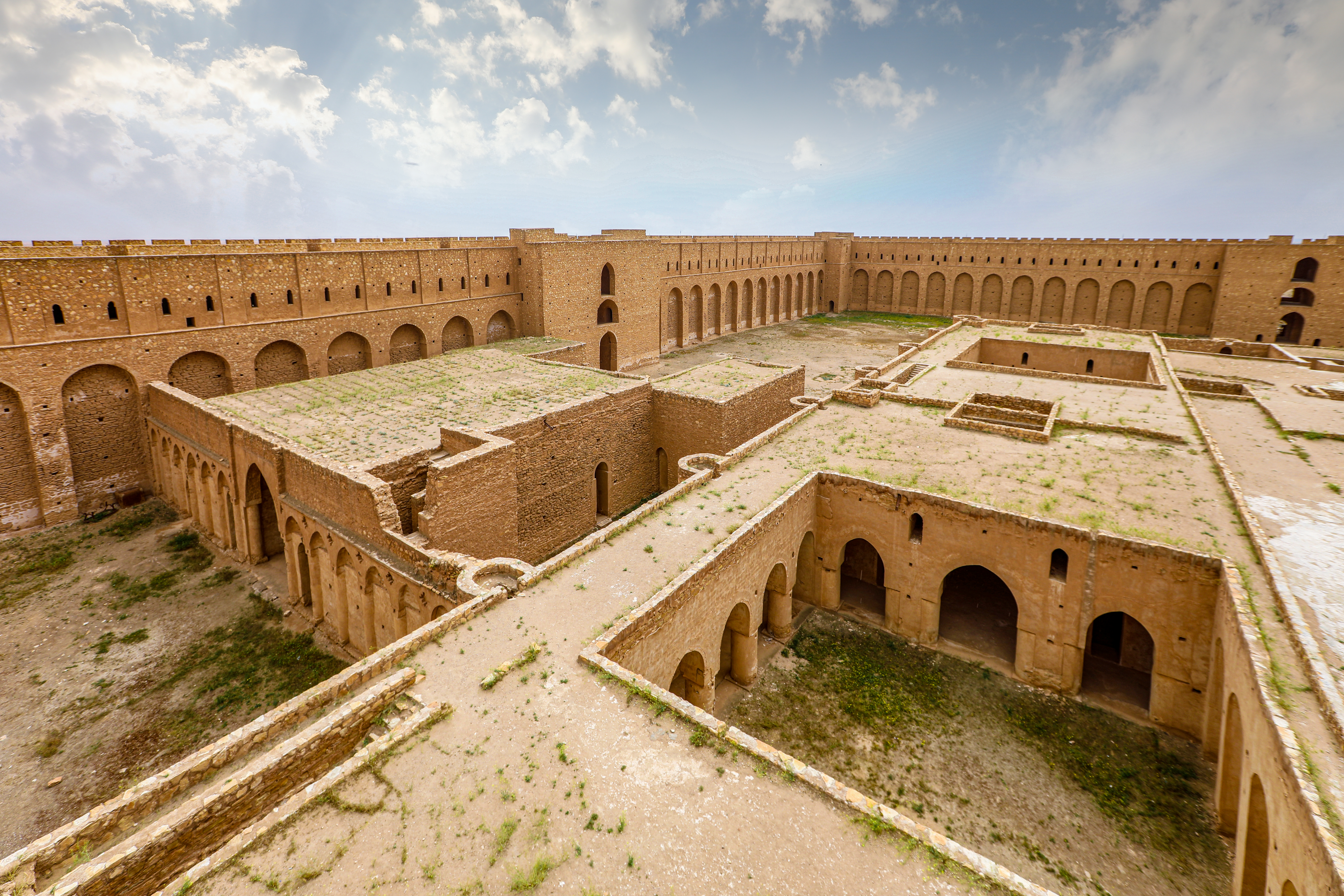
- Al-Ukhaidir Fortress near Karbala in Iraq

Site information
- Type: Fortress
- Owner: Government of Iraq
- Open to the public: Yes
- Condition: Partially preserved

Location
- Location in Iraq
- Coordinates: 32.440556°N 43.602222°E

Site history
- Built: 775
- Built for: Abbasid Caliphate
- Built by: Isa ibn Musa
- Materials: Stone, brick

Garrison information
- Designations: UNESCO World Heritage Tentative List (2000)

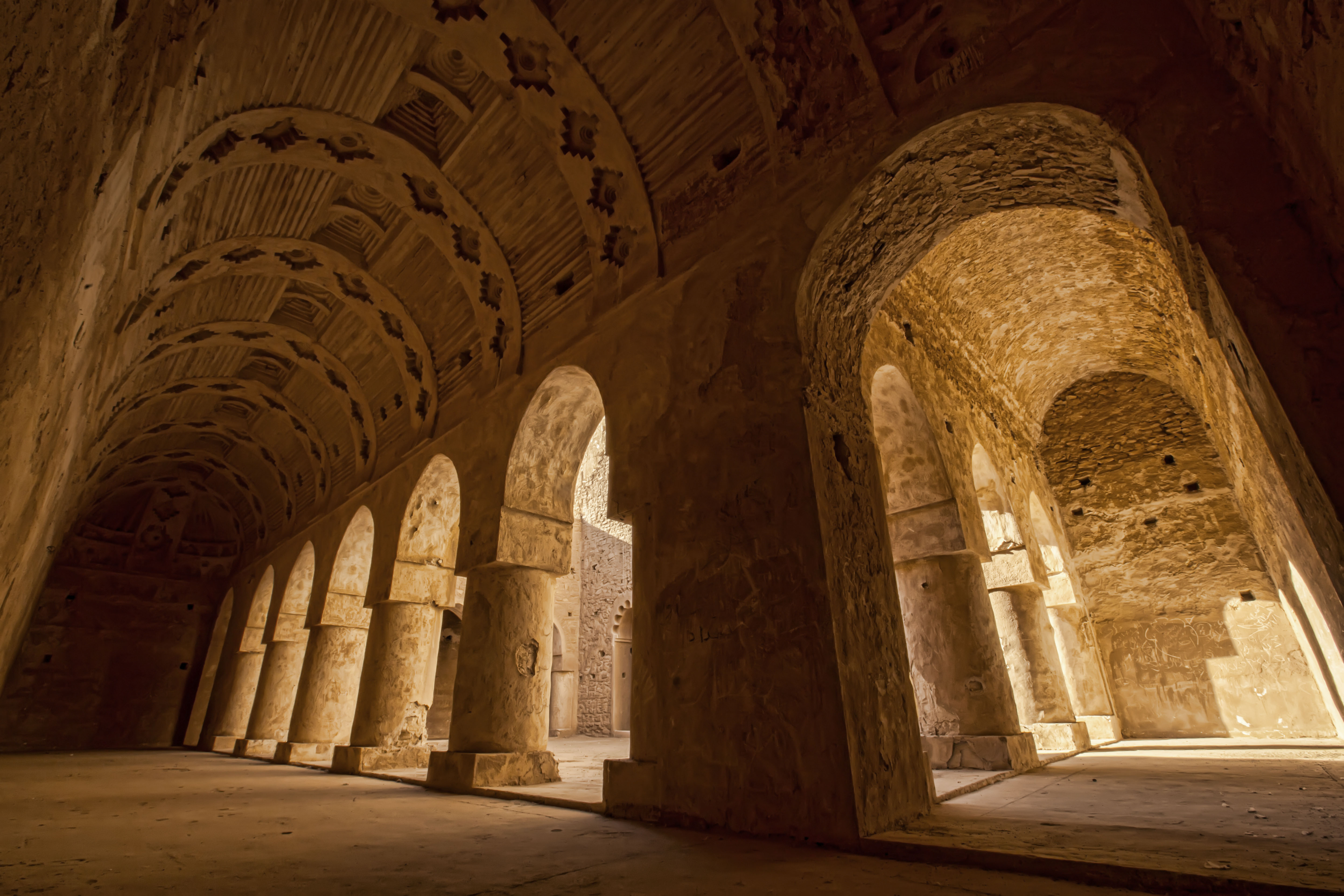
Inside Al-Ukhaidir Fortress

The Fortress of Al-Ukhaidir (Arabic: حصن الأخيضر) or Abbasid palace of Ukhaider is located roughly 50 km south of Karbala, Iraq. It is a large, rectangular fortress erected in 775 AD with a unique defensive style. Constructed by the Abbasid caliph As-Saffah's nephew Isa ibn Musa, Ukhaidir represents Abbasid architectural innovation in the structures of its courtyards, residences and mosque. Excavations at Ukhaidir were conducted in the early 20th century by Gertrude Bell, who wrote the first major report on the remains. Ukhaidir was an important stop on regional trade routes, similar to Atshan and Mujdah. The complex comprises a primary hall, a large Iwan, a reception hall and servants' quarters. The fortress exemplifies Abbasid architecture in Iraq by demonstrating the "despotic and the pleasure-loving character of the dynasty" in its grand size but cramped living quarters.

The current name could be related to Isma'il ibn Yusuf al-Ukhaidhir from Banu Ukhaidhir who launched a rebellion against the Abbasid, then later he became the governor of Kufa with the support of Qarmatians.

== World Heritage Status ==
This site was added to the UNESCO World Heritage Tentative List on July 7, 2000, in the Cultural category.

== Gallery ==
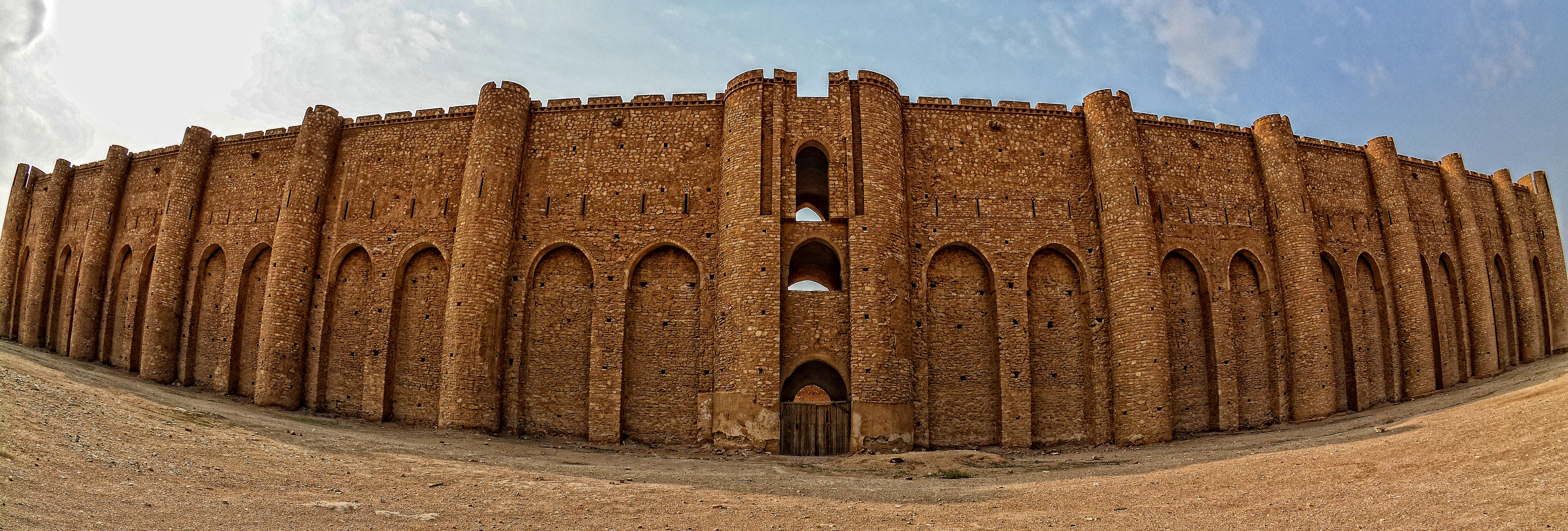
Al-Ukhaidir Fortress façade

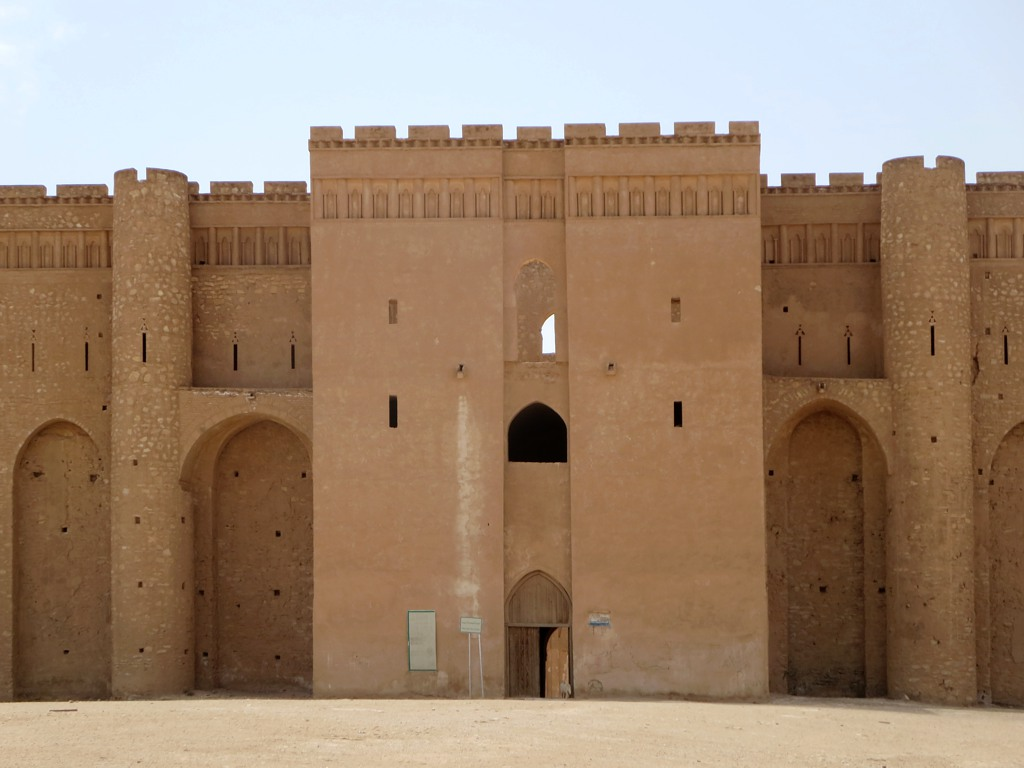
Al-Ukhaidir Fortress gate

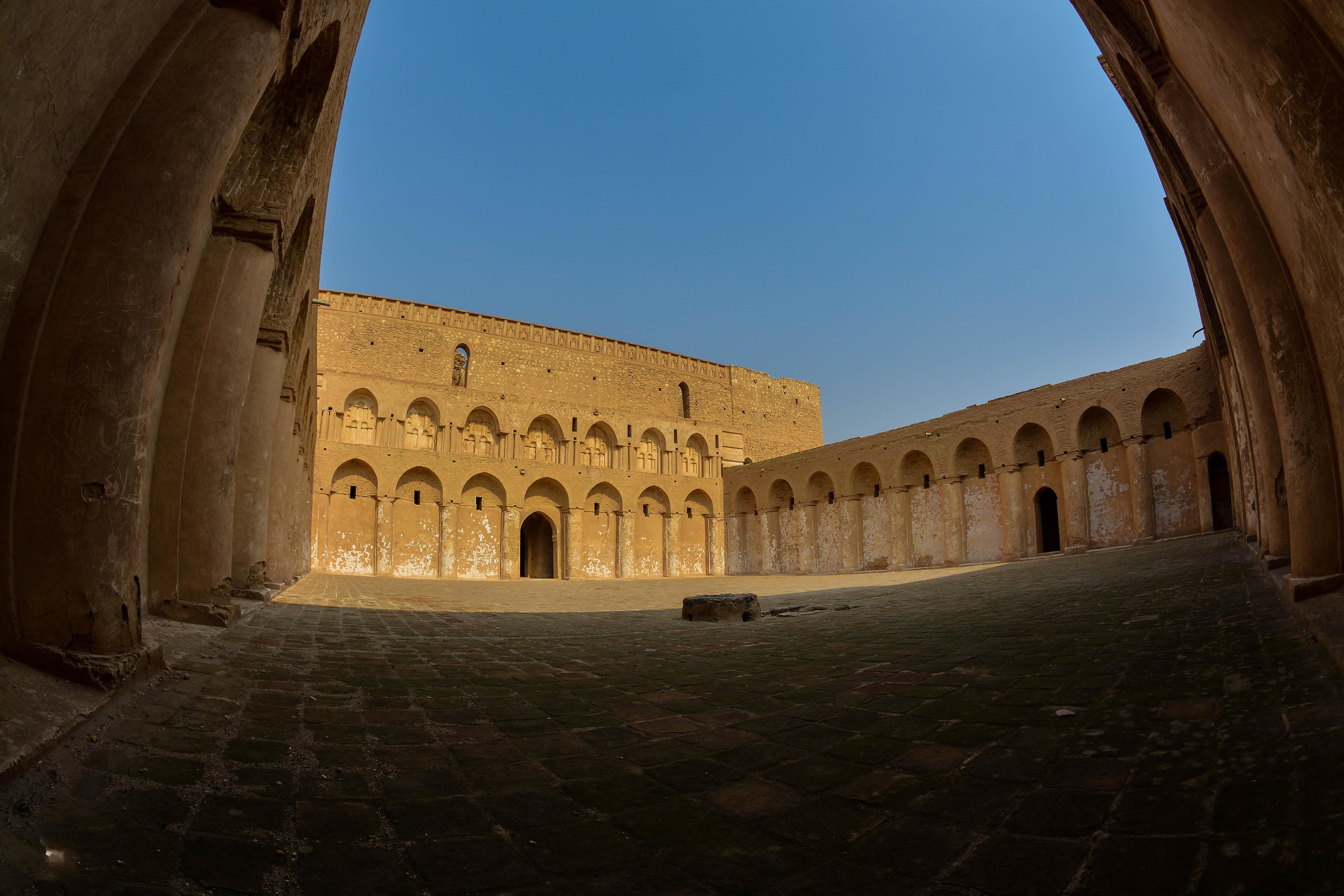
Al-Ukhaidir Fortress courtyard 1

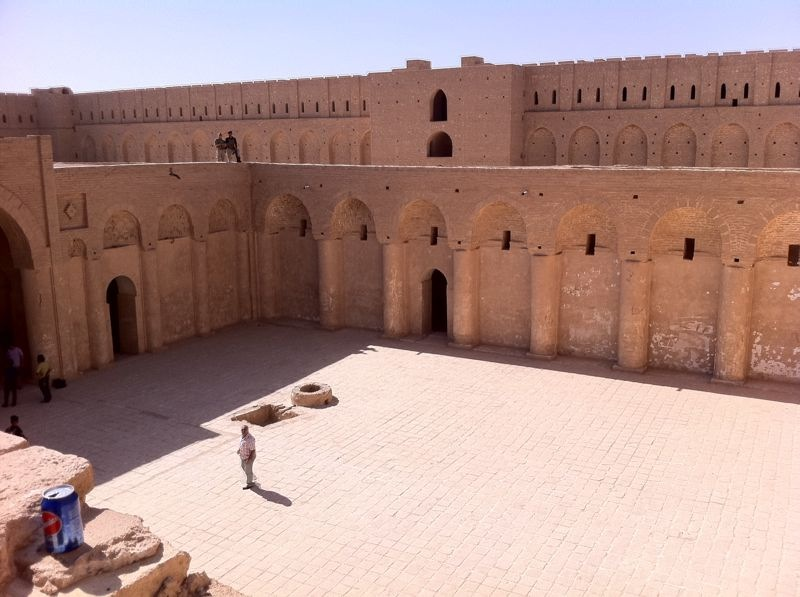
Al-Ukhaidir Fortress courtyard 2

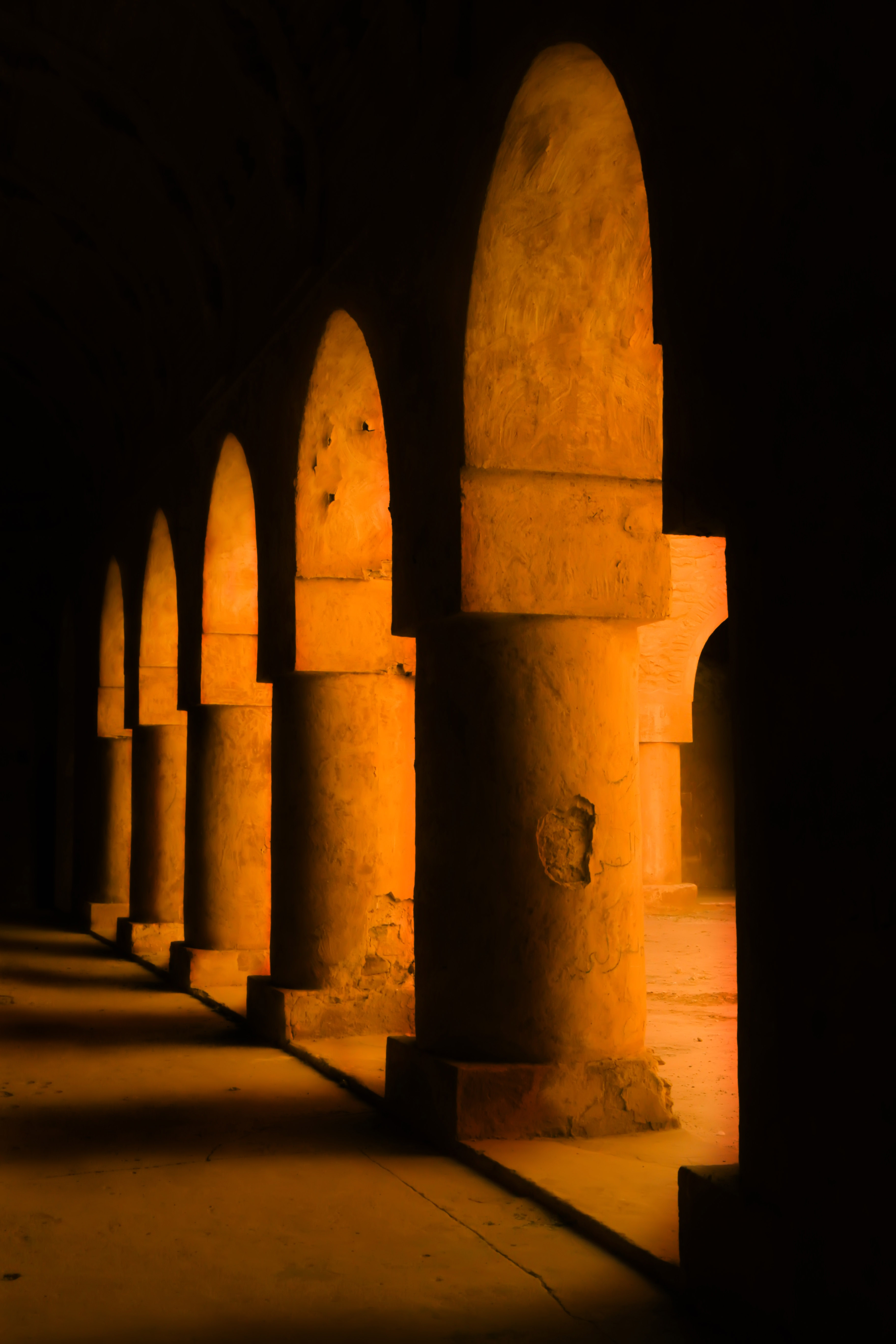
Al-Ukhaidir Fortress riwaq

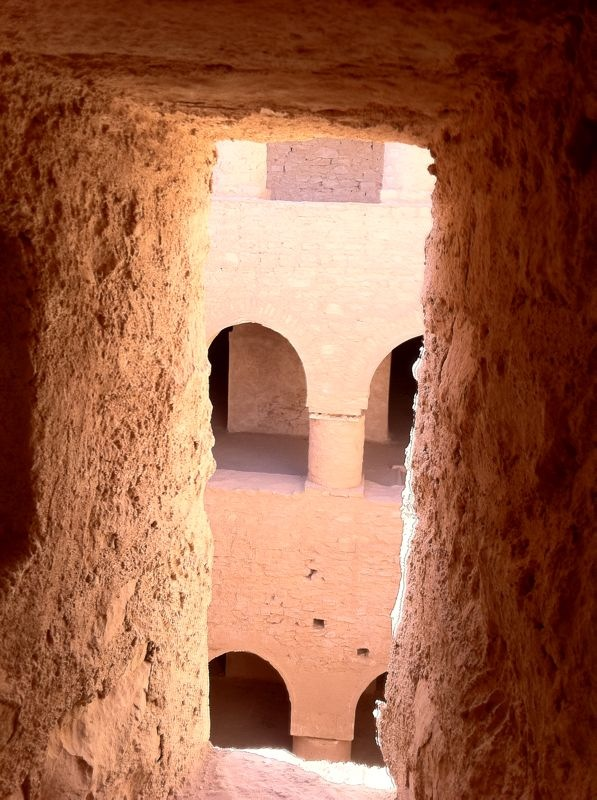
Al-Ukhaidir Fortress Iraq

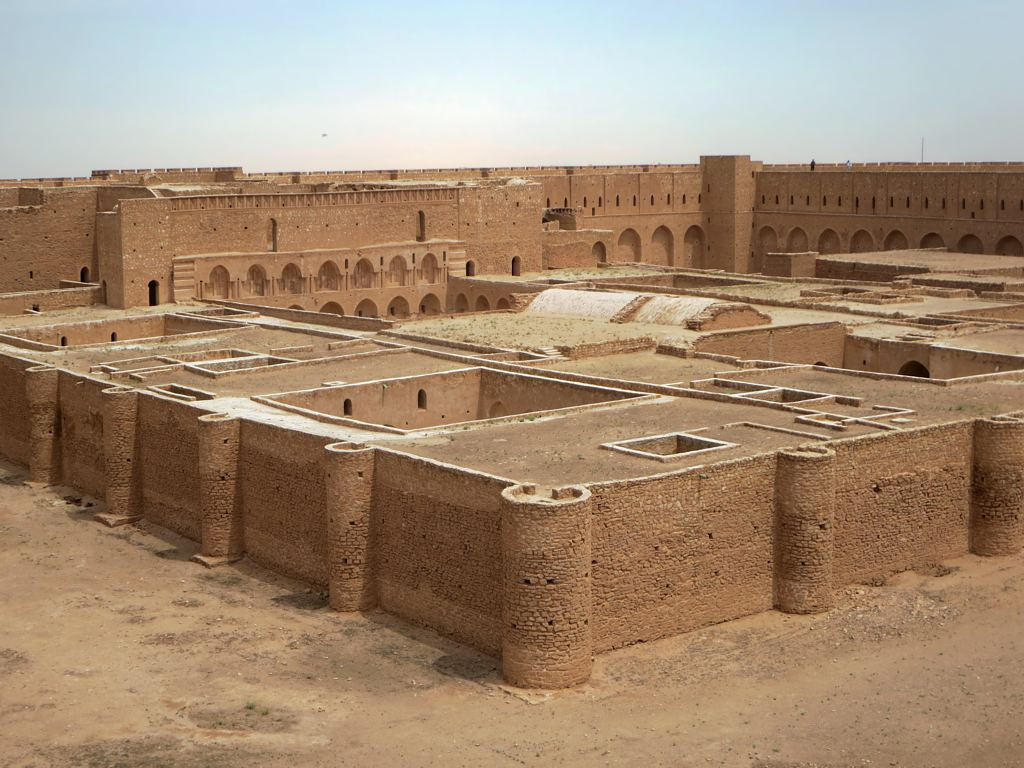
Al-Ukhaidir Fortress aerial view

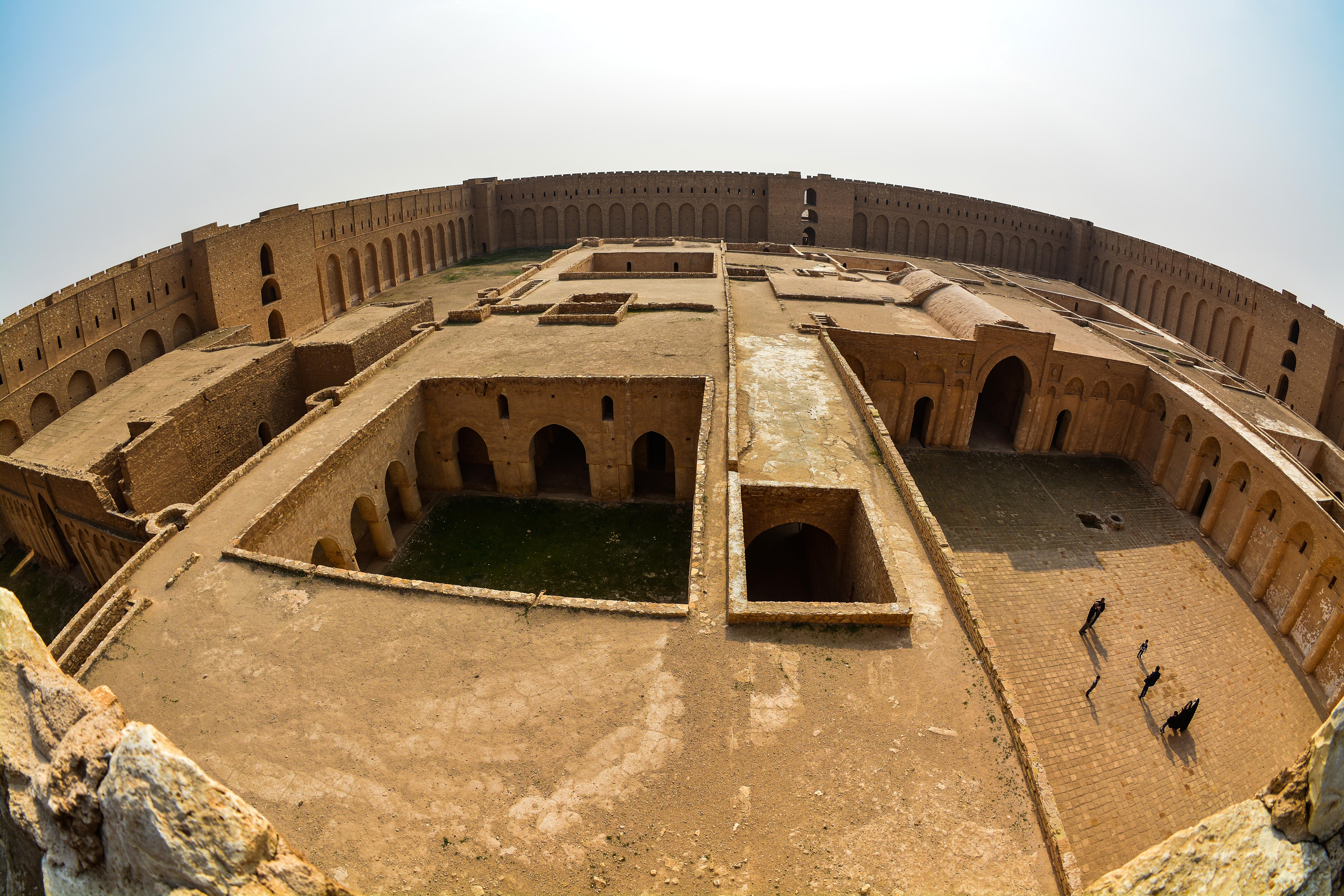
Courtyards

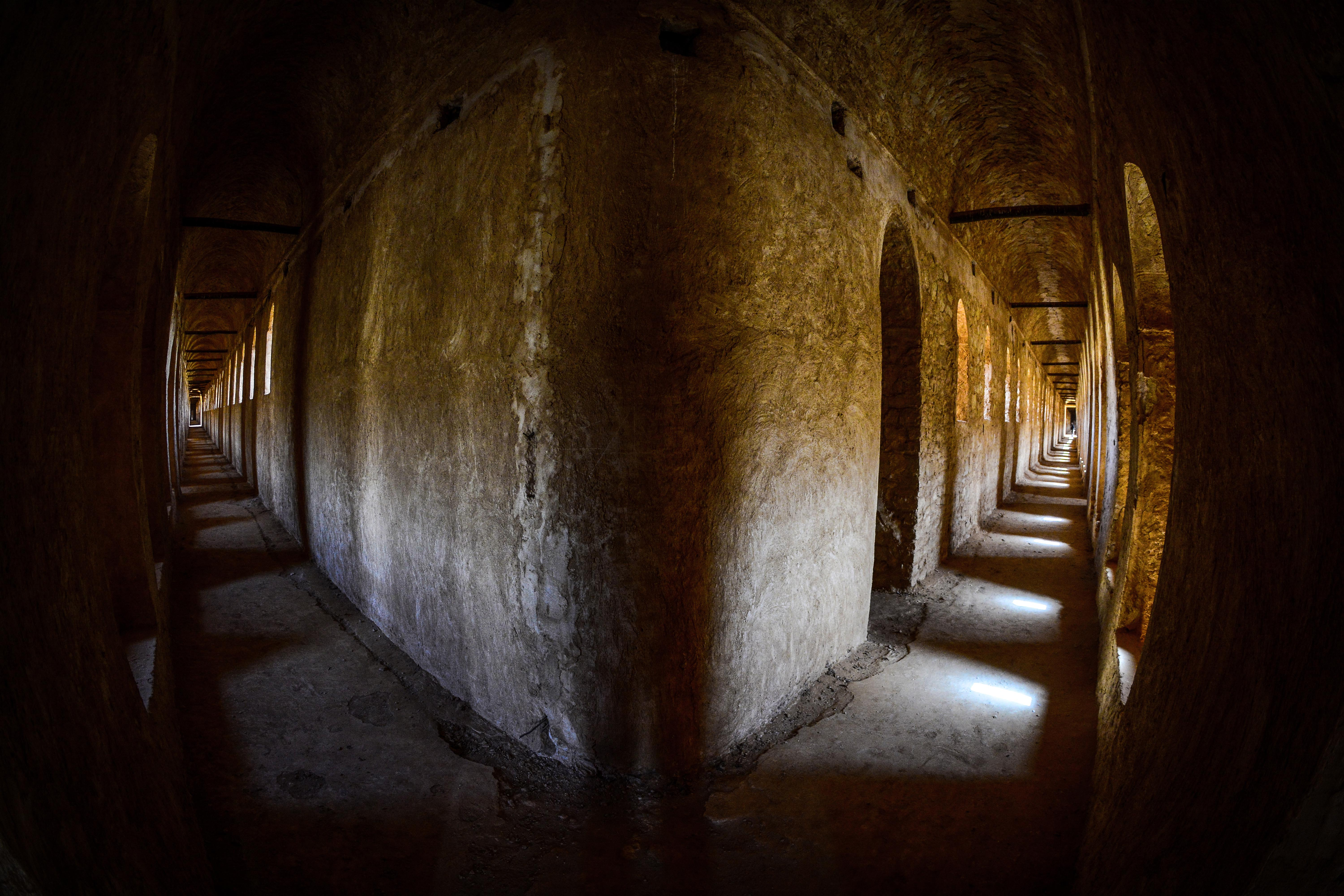
Internal corridors

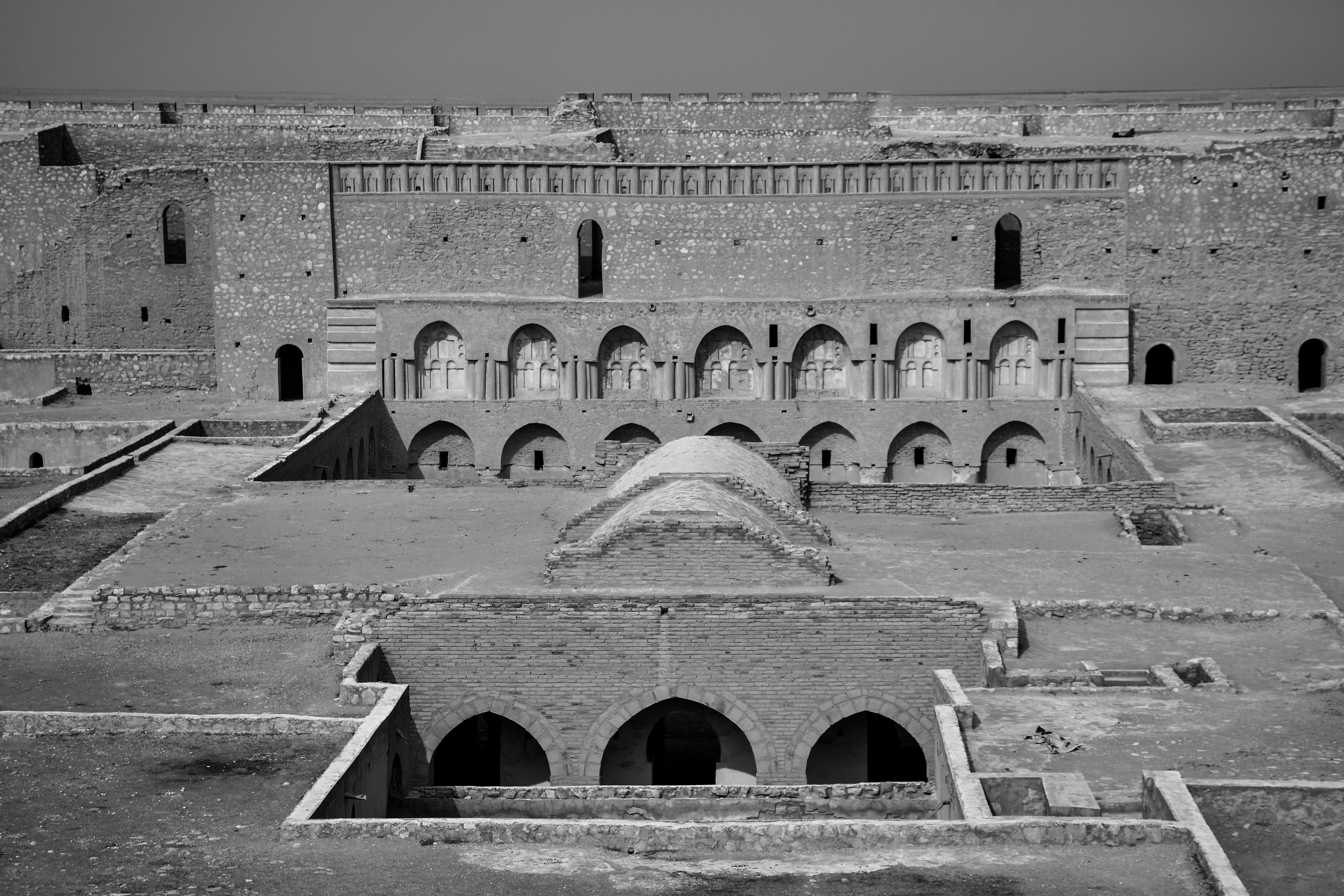
Rooftop

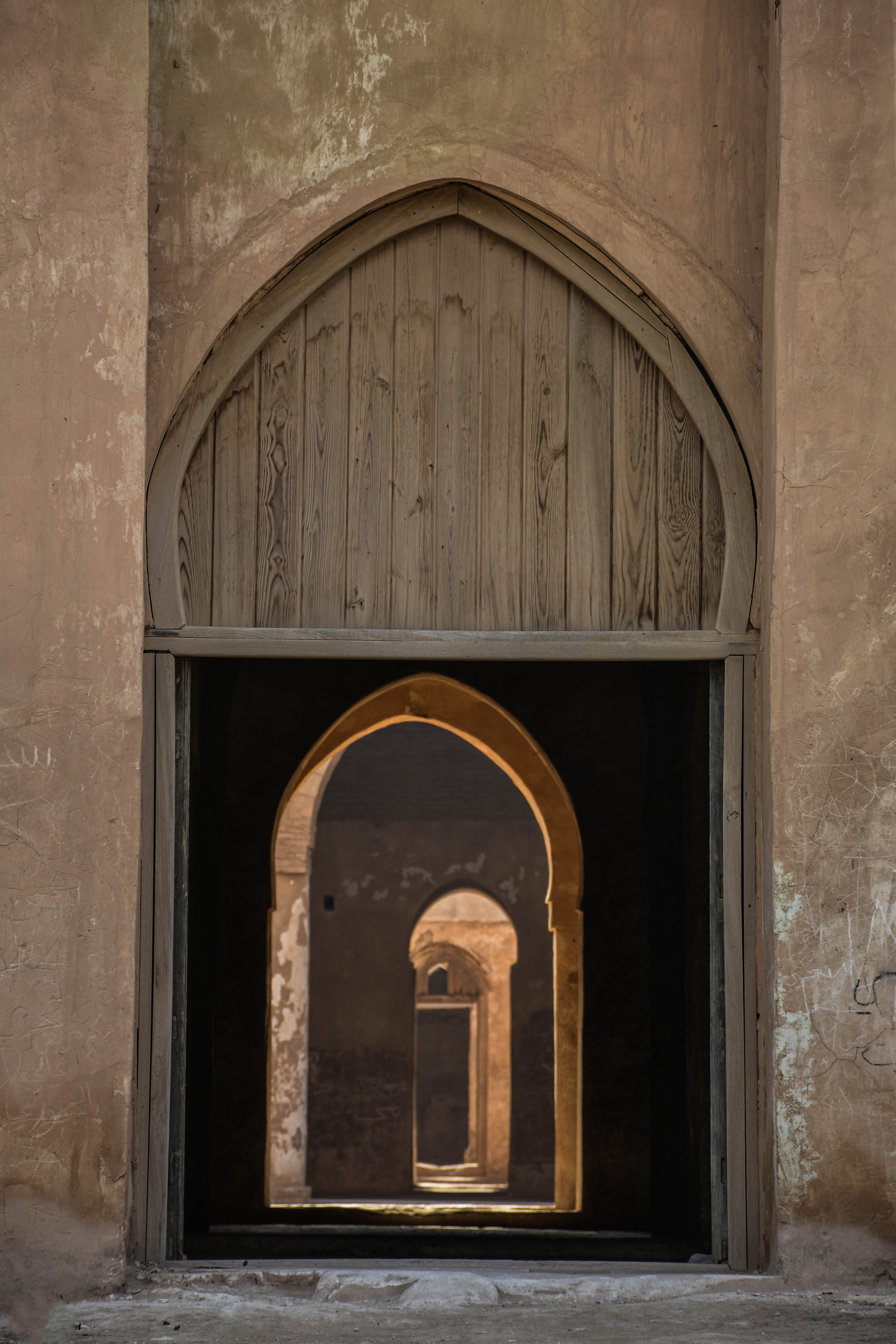
A sequence of different types of arches

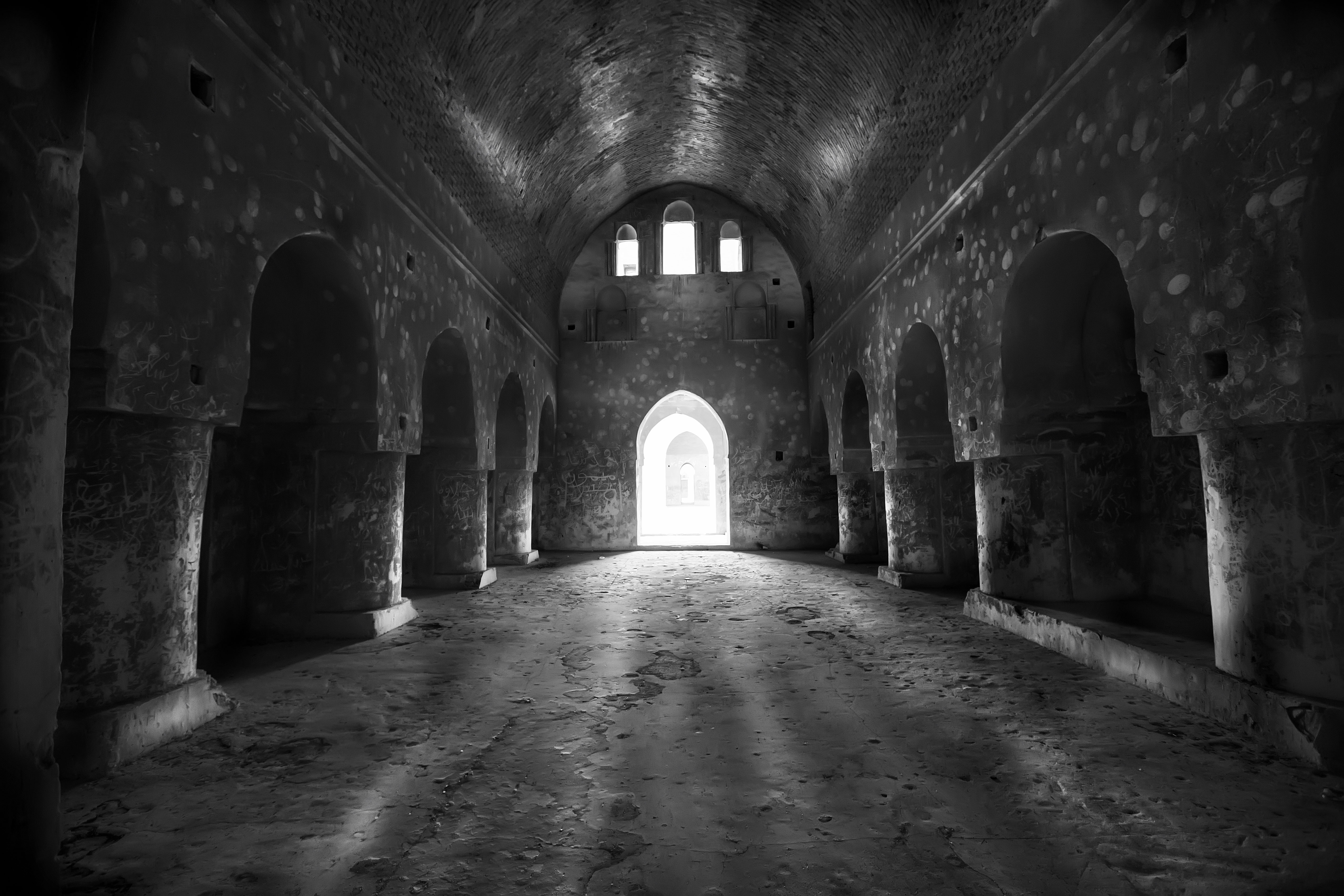
inside Al-Ukhaidir Fortress

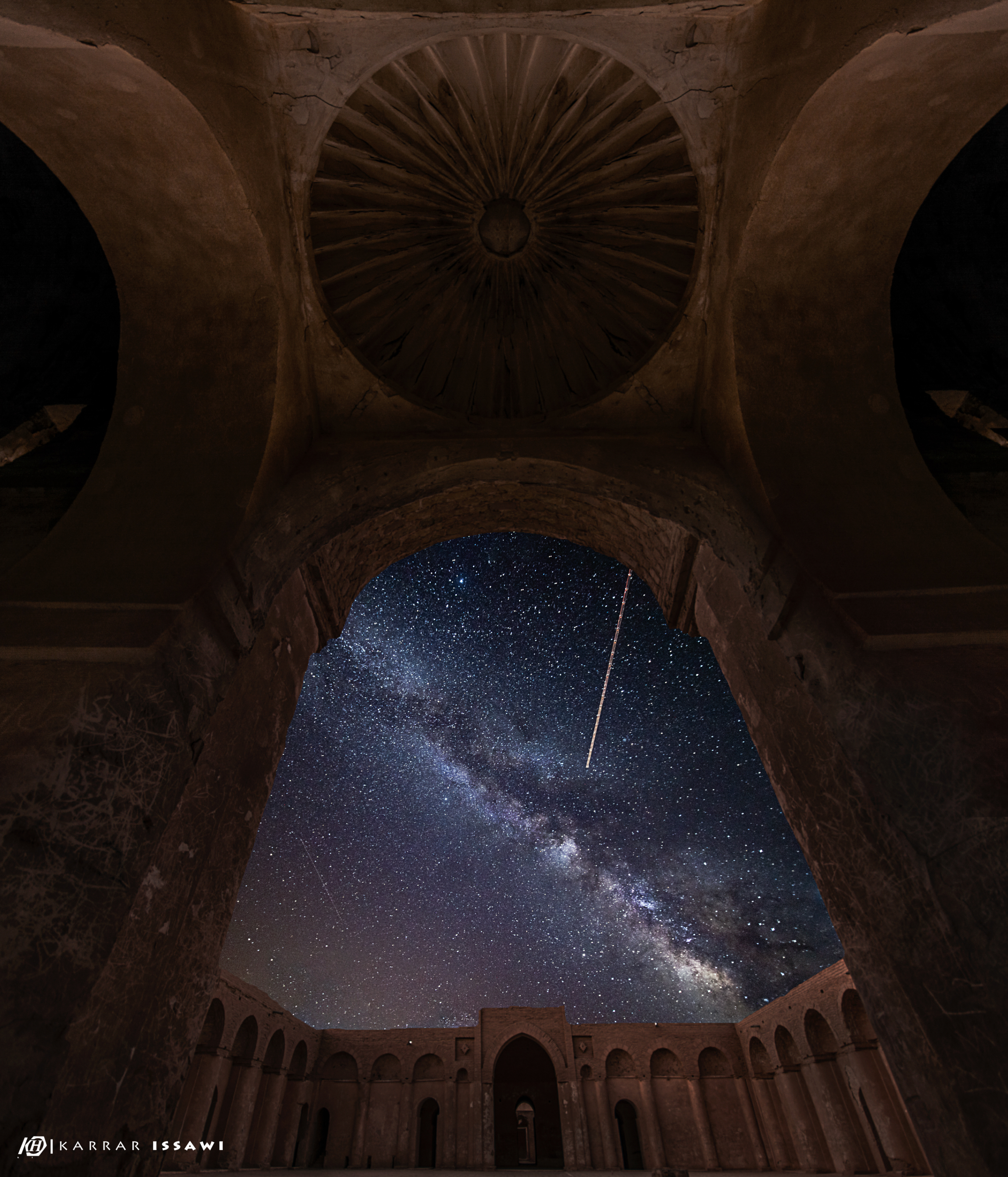
Al-Ukhaidir Fortress at night

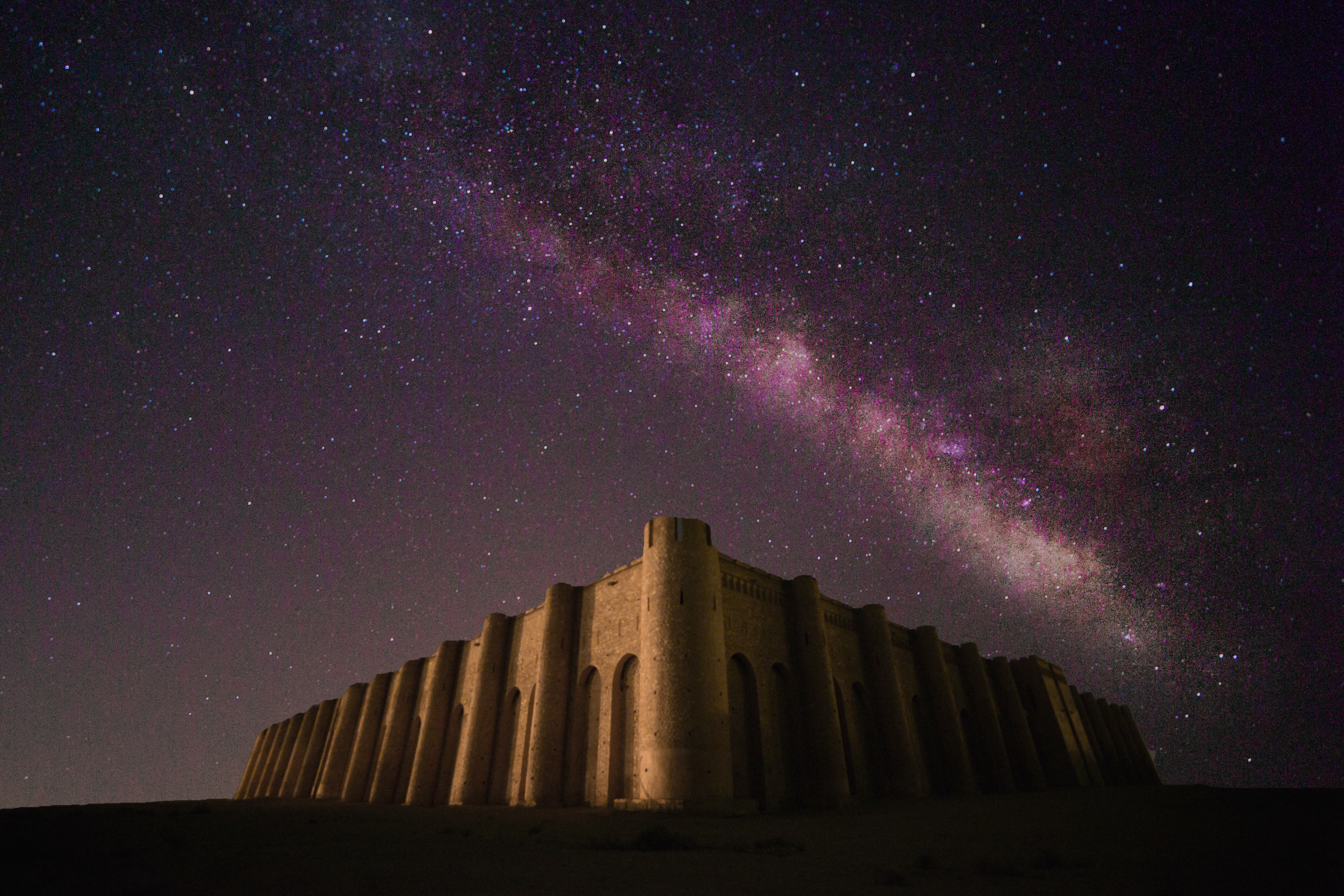
Al-Ukhaidir Fortress at night

== See also ==
- List of castles in Iraq
