= Muhammad ibn Zuhayr al-Azdi =

Muhammad ibn Zuhayr al-Dabbi (Arabic: محمد بن زهير الأزدي) was a governor of Egypt for the Abbasid Caliphate, from 789 to 790.

He was appointed to the province by the caliph Harun al-Rashid, with authority over both security and prayers (salah) and taxation (kharaj). His financial director Umar ibn Ghaylan, however, quickly alienated the people of Egypt with a series of unpopular policies, and soon afterwards the local jund staged a revolt over issues of pay. When the caliph learned that Muhammad had refrained from protecting Umar against the jund, he dismissed him from the governorship and replaced him with Dawud ibn Yazid ibn Hatim al-Muhallabi instead.

== Notes ==
Preceded by Maslamah ibn Yahya al-Bajali	Governor of Egypt; 789–790	Succeeded by Dawud ibn Yazid ibn Hatim al-Muhallabi
