= Maslama ibn Yahya al-Bajali =

Abbasid governor of Egypt (789–789)

Maslama ibn Yahya al-Bajali مسلمة بن يحيى البجلي

Abbasid Governor of Egypt
- In office February 789 – December 789
- Monarch: Harun al-Rashid
- Preceded by: Musa ibn Isa ibn Musa al-Hashimi
- Succeeded by: Muhammad ibn Zuhayr al-Azdi

Personal details
- Died: Abbasid Caliphate
- Parent: Yahya al-Bajali (father)

Maslama ibn Yahya al-Bajali (Arabic: مسلمة بن يحيى البجلي) was a Khurasani Arab general and governor of the Abbasid Caliphate.

He was the brother of Jibril ibn Yahya al-Bajali, who likely participated in the Abbasid Revolution and hence belonged to the khurasaniyya, the new regime's main power-base. Maslama served with Salih ibn Ali in Syria against the Byzantines, and in 789 as governor of Egypt for Caliph Harun al-Rashid.

== Sources ==
- Crone, Patricia (1980). Slaves on Horses: The Evolution of the Islamic Polity (1980 ed.). Cambridge: Cambridge University Press. p. 179. ISBN 978-0521229616.

Preceded by Musa ibn Isa ibn Musa al-Abbasi	Governor of Egypt; February–December 789	Succeeded by Muhammad ibn Zuhayr al-Azdi
