= Bishr ibn Dawud al-Muhallabi =

Bishr ibn Dawud al-Muhallabi (Arabic: بشر بن داود المهلبي) was a governor of al-Sind for the Abbasid Caliphate, serving during the caliphate of al-Ma'mun.

== Career ==
A member of the Muhallabid family, Bishr was the son of Dawud ibn Yazid, who had served as the governor of al-Sind since the caliphate of al-Rashid. After Yazid died in 820 or 821, Bishr succeeded his father and took over the government of al-Sind. Al-Ma'mun agreed to recognize him as governor, on the condition that Bishr send a million dirhams in tribute to him on an annual basis.

In spite of this agreement, however, Bishr soon decided to rebel against the caliph, and stopped forwarding any money to Baghdad. In response, al-Ma'mun placed an army under the command of Hajib ibn Salih in 826 and instructed him to reassert caliphal control over al-Sind. Bishr, however, defeated Hajib and forced him to retreat from the province. Following this, al-Ma'mun invested Ghassan ibn 'Abbad with the governorship of al-Sind and sent him to defeat Bishr. This time, Bishr decided to surrender and requested that Ghassan give him a guarantee of safe conduct. This was granted, and Bishr returned with Ghassan to Iraq in 831.

== Notes ==
Preceded by Dawud ibn Yazid al-Muhallabi	Governor of al-Sind; 820–828	Succeeded by Ghassan ibn 'Abbad
