= Dawud ibn Yazid ibn Hatim al-Muhallabi =

Dawud ibn Yazid ibn Hatim al-Muhallabi (Arabic: داود بن يزيد بن حاتم المهلبي) (died 820 or 821) was a provincial governor for the Abbasid dynasty in the late eighth and early ninth centuries. A member of the prominent Muhallabid family, he was briefly governor of the western provinces of Ifriqiyah (787 or 788) and Egypt (790-791), after which he was appointed to the eastern province of al-Sind (800), where he served for the remainder of his life.

== Career ==
Dawud was the son of Yazid ibn Hatim, who served as the governor of Ifriqiyah for the caliphs al-Mansur, al-Mahdi, al-Hadi, and al-Rashid. Yazid died early in the reign of al-Rashid, at which point Dawud temporarily succeeded him as governor. His leadership, however, proved to be inadequate, and the government's authority within the province began to weaken. As a result, al-Rashid appointed Dawud's uncle Rawh ibn Hatim to take control of Ifriqiyah instead. Following this, Dawud was appointed over Egypt in 790. After serving as governor there for slightly more than a year, he was dismissed from that post as well and replaced with the Abbasid prince Musa ibn 'Isa.

In 800 Dawud was invested with the governorship of al-Sind and tasked with pacifying the province, which was plagued by a longstanding conflict between the Arab tribes there. He initially sent his brother al-Mughirah to take control of al-Mansurah, but the city's inhabitants rebelled and expelled him. Dawud then entered al-Sind in force and laid siege to al-Mansurah, which he managed to take several months later. He then proceeded to secure the other cities of al-Sind, thereby firmly reestablishing Abbasid control over the province.

Dawud spent the next two decades as governor of al-Sind, setting a record for the longest tenure of any governor in the early Abbasid period. Conditions in the province remained quiet for the remainder of his administration. He died in 820 or 821 and was succeeded by his son Bishr.

== Notes ==
Preceded by Yazid ibn Hatim al-Muhallabi	Governor of Ifriqiyah; 787 or 788	Succeeded by Rawh ibn Hatim al-Muhallabi
Preceded by Muhammad ibn Zuhayr al-Azdi	Governor of Egypt; 791–792	Succeeded by Musa ibn 'Isa
Preceded by Ayyub ibn Ja'far ibn Sulayman	Governor of al-Sind; 800–820	Succeeded by Bishr ibn Dawud al-Muhallabi
