= Hasan ibn Zayd ibn Hasan =

8th-century Abbasid Governor of Medina

Ḥasan ibn Zayd ibn Ḥasan ibn ʿAlī حسن بن زيد بن حسن بْن عَلِيّ

Abbasid governor of Medina
- In office 767–772
- Monarch: al-Mansur
- Preceded by: Ja'far ibn Sulayman ibn Ali
- Succeeded by: Abd al-Samad ibn Ali

Personal details
- Born: Medina
- Died: 783 Medina, Abbasid Caliphate
- Spouses: Umm Salama bint Husayn al-Athram ibn Hasan ibn Ali; Riyad bint Bistam ibn Umayr ibn al-Salil ibn Qays
- Relations: Banu Hashim (clan)
- Children: Muhammad; Al-Qasim; Umm Kulthum; Ali; Ibrahim; Zayd; Isa; Ismail; Ishaq al-A'war; Abd Allah; Nafisa; Fatima al-Anwar.
- Parent: Zayd ibn Hasan ibn Ali (father) Zujajah Raqraq (mother)

Abū Muḥammad al-Ḥasan ibn Zayd ibn al-Ḥasan ibn ʿAlī ibn Abī Ṭālib (Arabic: الحسن بن زيد بن الحسن بن علي بن أبي طالب; died 783), was a notable Alid who served as governor of Medina under al-Mansur.

Hasan was the grandson of Hasan ibn Ali, the firstborn son of Ali and Fatima, the daughter of Muhammad. A pious man, he emulated his father and grandfather in not meddling with the power struggles for the Caliphate, and unlike many Alids he acquiesced to the Abbasids' seizure of power after the Abbasid revolution. The first Abbasid Caliph, al-Saffah, married his daughter, and allowed Hasan to live at the court. In 767, al-Saffah's successor al-Mansur appointed Hasan as governor of the holy city of Medina, but dismissed him in 772 after the two fell out, and confiscated his wealth. After al-Mansur died in 775, the new Caliph, al-Mahdi, restored Hasan to his possessions. Hasan died during the hajj to Mecca in 783, and was buried at al-Hajir.

== Sources ==
- Buhl, Fr. (1971). "al-Ḥasan b. Zayd b. al-Ḥasan". In Lewis, B.; Ménage, V. L.; Pellat, Ch. & Schacht, J. (eds.). The Encyclopaedia of Islam, Second Edition. Volume III: H–Iram. Leiden: E. J. Brill. pp. 245–246. OCLC 495469525.
