= Banu Ukhaidhir =

Arab Dynasty

The Banu 'l-Ukhaidhir (Arabic: بنو الأخيضر, romanized: Banū ʾl-Ukhayḍir), informally as Ukhaydhirites, was an Arab dynasty that ruled in al-Yamama (central Arabia) from 867 to at least the mid-eleventh century. An Alid dynasty, they were descendants of Muhammad through his daughter Fatima and his grandson Al-Hasan, and at least one contemporary traveler describes them as having been Shi'ites of the Zaydi persuasion. Their capital was known as al-Khidhrimah, which lay near the present-day city of Al-Kharj in Saudi Arabia.

== History ==
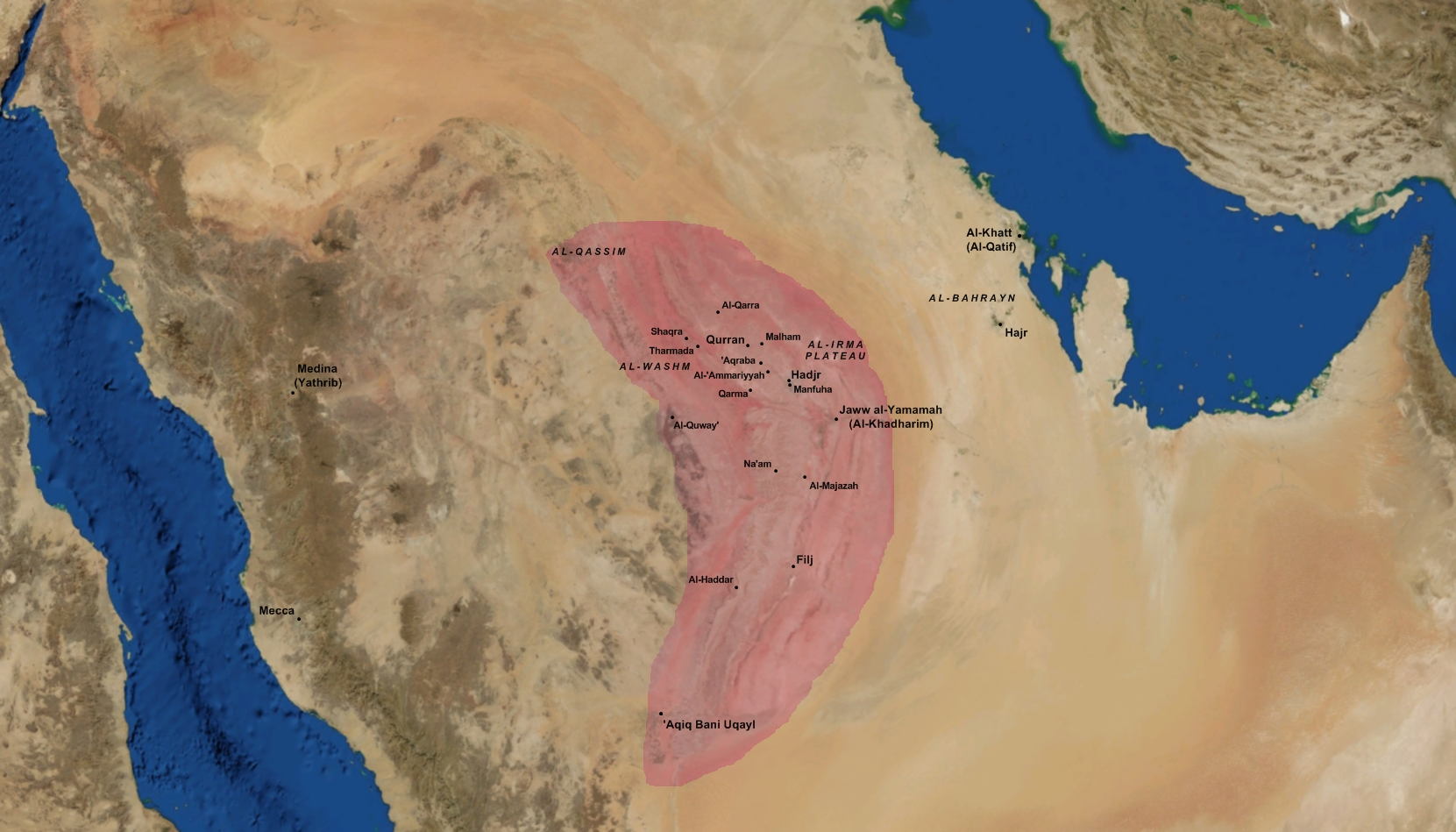
Al-Yamamah in the early Islamic period

The founder of the dynasty was Muhammad ibn Yusuf al-Ukhaidhir ibn Ibrahim ibn Musa al-Djawn ibn Abd Allah al-Kāmil ibn Al-Hasan al-Mu'thannā bin Al-Hassan al-mujtaba bin Ali al Murtaza bin Abi Talib. Muhammad's brother Isma'il had launched a rebellion in the Tihamah in 865 against the Abbasid government and temporarily occupied the city of Mecca. After Isma'il's death the following year, Muhammad began stirring up trouble along the road running between the Hejaz and Iraq, but was defeated by the road's governor Abu 'l-Saj Dewdad. Fleeing from the government forces, he made his way in al-Yamamah and established himself there in 867.

Al-Yamamah at the time was nominally part of the Abbasid Caliphate, but the central government had largely neglected the area for years due to its remoteness. With the exception of the occasional raid by government forces, the tribes there were largely self-governing. When Muhammad arrived in al-Yamamah, he likely gained the support of the Banu Hanifa, the largest tribe in the area, and created an independent amirate.

It is not known how much of al-Yamamah was ruled by Muhammad and his descendants. Descriptions of the extent of the amirate by medieval Muslim historians vary; one source states that it controlled only al-Khidhrimah and its outskirts, while another claims that it ruled over a territory that extended as far north as Qurran.

The early rule of the Banu 'l-Ukhaidhir was characterized by a sustained economic depression. Thousands of people are recorded as having emigrated from al-Yamamah to various provinces of the caliphate in order to escape the turmoil. Muhammad has been blamed for this period of hardship due to his oppressive rule, although it has been noted that reports of mass emigration from al-Yamamah began years before his arrival.

Muhammad was succeeded as amir by his son Yusuf, who was himself succeeded by his son Isma'il. Isma'il established an alliance with the powerful Qarmatians of neighboring Al-Hasa. He participated in the capture of Kufa in 925 and was given command of the town by the Qarmatian leader Abu Tahir. Relations between the two sides, however, subsequently soured, and in 928 Isma'il and several members of his family were killed in a battle with the Qarmatians.

Isma'il was succeeded by his son al-Hasan, and at this point the amirate likely subordinate to the Qarmatians. After the rule of al-Hasan's son Ahmad, the history of the Banu 'l-Ukhaidhir becomes obscure. When the traveler Nasir-i Khusraw arrived in al-Yamamah in 1051, the Banu 'l-Ukhaidhir were still ruling there, but at some point after this the Banu Kilab took over the country.

== Rulers ==
(Established in 866 by Muḥammad ibn Yūsūfūʾl-Ukhayḍir ibn Ibrāhīm ibn Mūsā al-Jawn after the unsuccessful revolt of his brother Ismā'īl ibn Yūsūfūʾl-Ukhayḍir in April 865)

1. Muḥammad ibn Yūsūfūʾl-Ukhayḍir ibn Ibrāhīm ibn Mūsā al-Jawn ibn ʿAbd Allāh al-Kāmīl ibn Ḥasan al-Mu'thannā ibn Ḥasan al-Mujtabā (from 866)
2. Yūsūf ibn Muḥammad ibn Yūsūfūʾl-Ukhayḍir ibn Ibrāhīm ibn Mūsā al-Jawn ibn ʿAbd Allāh al-Kāmīl ibn Ḥasan al-Mu'thannā (son of #1)
3. Ismā'īl ibn Yūsūf ibn Muḥammad ibn Yūsūfūʾl-Ukhayḍir ibn Ibrāhīm ibn Mūsā al-Jawn ibn ʿAbd Allāh al-Kāmīl (son of #2) (to 928)
4. Al-Ḥasan ibn Yūsūf ibn Muḥammad ibn Yūsūfūʾl-Ukhayḍir ibn Ibrāhīm ibn Mūsā al-Jawn (brother of #3)
5. Aḥmad ibn al-Ḥasan ibn Yūsūf ibn Muḥammad ibn Yūsūfūʾl-Ukhayḍir ibn Ibrāhīm (son of #4)
6. Abu 'l-Muqallid Ja'far ibn Aḥmad ibn al-Ḥasan ibn Yūsūf ibn Muḥammad ibn Yūsūfūʾl-Ukhayḍir (son of #5)
7. And the Descendants of Abu 'l-Muqallid Ja'far ibn Aḥmad ibn al-Ḥasan ibn Yūsūf ibn Muḥammad

After Aḥmad ibn al-Ḥasan ibn Yūsūf, the list of rulers becomes uncertain, but later amirs were descendants of his son Abu 'l-Muqallid Ja'far.

== See also ==
- Alids
- List of Shi'a Muslim dynasties
