= Al-Mansur Yahya =

Imam of the Zaidi state in Yemen from 934 to 976

Al-Mansur Yahya (died 976) was an imam of the Zaidi state in Yemen, whose tenure as imam is counted from 934 to 976.

Yahya bin Ahmad was the fifth son of the imam an-Nasir Ahmad, and the grandson of the founder-imam al-Hadi ila'l-Haqq Yahya. Even before the death of an-Nasir in 934, three of his sons quarreled bitterly among themselves. Although the Zaidi imamship was not strictly hereditary but depended on personal qualifications and descent from Muhammad, succession tended to take place within particular families descended from al-Qasim ar-Rassi (d. 860) and his grandson al-Hadi ila'l-Haqq Yahya (d. 911). Two sons of an-Nasir, al-Muntakhab al-Hasan (d. 936) and al-Mukhtar al-Qasim (d. 956), contested the dignity. None of them is recognized as a right imam in later Zaidi chronicles. Their younger brother al-Mansur Yahya is, on the other hand, counted as imam from 934 to his death in 976. The internal dissension among the Zaydiyyah was accentuated by the behaviour of the tribal groups of the northern Yemeni highlands, which supported one side or the other according to their interests. Few details are otherwise known about al-Mansur Yahya, and the politics of highland Yemen were dominated by the rival Yu'firid Dynasty. Personally he was remembered as a man of learning who conveyed much of the religious tradition of his father and grandfather. At his demise, the imam was succeeded by his son ad-Da'i Yusuf.

== See also ==
- Imams of Yemen
- Rassids

Preceded by an-Nasir Ahmad	Imam of Yemen; 934-976	Succeeded by ad-Da'i Yusuf
