= March 2009 Yemen bombings =

Suicide attacks against South Koreans in Yemen

- Part of the al-Qaeda insurgency in Yemen
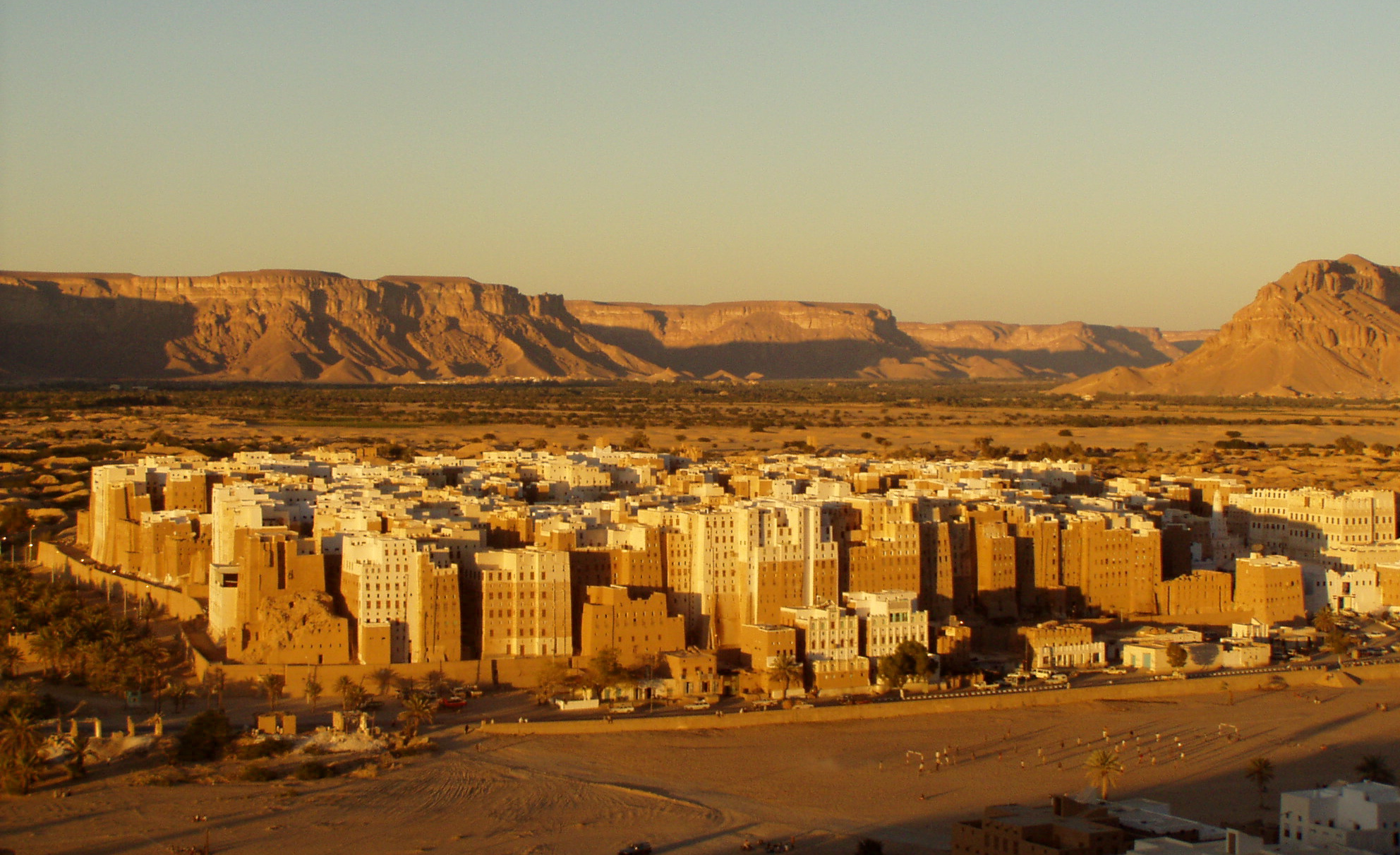
- Shibam photographed in 2008 from Khazzan, the hill where the first bombing occurred

- Locations of the two attacks
- Location: Shibam and Sanaa, Yemen
- Date: 15–18 March 2009
- Target: South Koreans
- Attack type: Suicide bombings
- Weapon: Improvised explosive devices
- Deaths: 7 (including 2 perpetrators)
- Injuries: 4
- Perpetrator: Al-Qaeda in the Arabian Peninsula
- Assailants: Abd al-Rahman Mahdi al-Ujayri †; Khaled al-Dhayani †
- Accused: 12

In March 2009, two suicide bombings took place in Yemen targeting nationals of South Korea. The first bombing was on 15 March in Shibam, Hadhramaut, a UNESCO-designated World Heritage Site and popular tourist attraction. A suicide bomber waiting atop a hill encountered a South Korean tourist group and asked for a photograph with them before blowing himself up, killing four tourists and their Yemeni guide. Later on 18 March, a motorcade transporting a South Korean delegation investigating the incident as well as the victims' relatives was attacked by another suicide bomber near Sanaa International Airport, although they escaped unharmed.

The bombings were claimed by al-Qaeda in the Arabian Peninsula (AQAP), which cited them as revenge for South Korea's involvement in the war on terror among other reasons. The group released a video claiming to have known the exact movements of the convoy in Sanaa while showcasing the perpetrators of the bombings; Abd al-Rahman Mahdi al-Ujayri and Khaled al-Dhayani. The South Korean response team was involved in a Yemeni-led investigation into the first bombing and left shortly after the second bombing, as officials questioned whether the targeting of their citizens was predetermined. Yemeni authorities accused a 12-man cell of planning the attacks and announced the arrest of six members on 25 March. They later concluded in June that AQAP did not specifically target South Koreans but instead foreigners in general.

The South Korean foreign ministry condemned the bombings and implemented increased precautions for diplomatic facilities while urging its citizens to avoid Yemen. The attacks were denounced in Yemen and harmed the tourist industry of Shibam, while the second bombing prompted scrutiny from the House of Representatives over the potential compromise of security forces. Analysts interpreted the bombings as a sign of AQAP's growing strength.

== Background ==
The bombings followed numerous other attacks throughout the previous years by al-Qaeda in Yemen against tourists and foreign interests. It also followed the merger of the Yemeni and Saudi branches of al-Qaeda and the formation of al-Qaeda in the Arabian Peninsula (AQAP) in January 2009. In the video announcing its formation, AQAP leader Nasir al-Wuhayshi threatened attacks on Western nationals in the region. Field commander Mohammed al-Awfi was captured and extradited to Saudi Arabia the next month in what was considered a blow to the organization at the time.

== Bombings ==
=== Shibam, 15 March ===
On 15 March 2009, at approximately 5:50 p.m. local time, a suicide bomber attacked a group of South Korean tourists in Shibam, a town in Hadhramaut. Shibam was a UNESCO-designated World Heritage Site and major tourist attraction in Yemen renowned for its ancient mudbrick architecture. The attack occurred on the hill of Khazzan which overlooks the town and was a popular spot for taking photographs. Rather than a suicide vest, the bomber was equipped with a "rectangular, ten-centimeter-deep metal box" storing an explosive with a picture frame and painting of a waterfall bolted over for concealment.

The bomber scouted for the largest possible group of tourists to attack, interacting with other tourists in the meantime. He eventually spotted the South Koreans who were admiring the scene and taking photographs of Shibam at sunset. Citing official sources, NewsYemen claimed the bomber had asked for a picture with the tourists and posed with them shortly before blowing himself up. He reportedly was chewing khat, which has effects similar to amphetamines, and tried to move children away from the vicinity.

The Korean group consisted of sixteen tourists and two travel agency staff who had arrived in Yemen on 9 March. Shibam was included in the tour due to its "scenic landscape and its relative safety" according to Themesay Tour, the travel agency based in Seoul which operated the tour. Only thirteen of the eighteen people in the group went to Shibam as the others were staying at their hotel.

The bombing killed four South Korean tourists and one Yemeni tour guide. Three tourists and one Yemeni were also wounded. The victims were taken to a hospital in Seiyun before transferred to Sanaa, while the other tourists were taken to a hotel for preparations to leave Yemen. The twelve surviving tourists, including those injured, returned to South Korea through an Emirates flight, stopping in Dubai before arriving at Incheon International Airport in Seoul on 17 March. The remains of those killed were transported to Incheon International Airport on 19 March, along with their relatives who had travelled to Yemen to bring them back.

=== Sanaa, 18 March ===
On 18 March, a South Korean government delegation sent in response to the first bombing was attacked in the capital Sanaa. The delegation was travelling in a convoy consisting of a Yemeni police car at the front followed by one vehicle carrying foreign ministry secretary Jang Dae-kyo, senior advisor Lee Ki-cheol, and tour organizer Ma Kyong-Chan, and another vehicle with three relatives of the victims and foreign ministry employee Lee Myung-kwang. The group had left Shahran Hotel and was heading to Sanaa International Airport to depart from Yemen. A Yemeni official said security forces were anticipating a possible attack at the airport.

Citing a local newspaper, Jane Novak of FDD's Long War Journal reported that AQAP obtained information on the route and timing of the convoy. A suicide bomber was dispatched with a explosive-rigged cassette player. He positioned himself on the road by the gates of the al-Dailami Air Base which is part of the airport on the outskirts of Sanaa. At 8:40 a.m. local time (2:40 p.m. KST), as the convoy neared the airport and slowed down amidst heavy traffic, the bomber walked towards them and blew himself up between the first and second vehicles. However, he detonated his explosives seconds after the vehicles had already passed, killing only himself and harming no others, while shattering car windows. The bereaved relatives later boarded their flight returning to South Korea on schedule.

== Responsibility ==
Although initially going unclaimed, the Yemeni government quickly attributed the attacks to al-Qaeda. The first bombing was eventually claimed by AQAP through an internet statement issued on 26 March, citing it as an attempt to "expel the infidels from the Arabian Peninsula" and revenge for the killing of Soldiers' Brigade of Yemen leader Hamza al-Qaiti by local security forces the previous August. According to the statement, the South Koreans were targeted due to their country's involvement in the Iraq War and war in Afghanistan among other reasons, including their role in "corrupting the ideology of Muslims and their morals" and for spreading Christianity. The group reportedly claimed the second bombing in April and said it was meant to underscore the lack of security for South Koreans in Yemen.

A video titled "I Have Won I Swear to Kaaba's God" was released through AQAP's al-Malahem Media Foundation in June containing details on the attacks. The video claimed the bombings were premeditated and they had knowledge of the South Korean response teams' movements prior to the second bombing. It included the two bombers, Abd al-Rahman Mahdi Ali Qasim al-Ujayri and Khaled al-Dhayani, delivering statements addressed to their families along with visuals of the improvised explosive devices they were fitted with, possibly to disprove the notion that the attackers used explosive belts.

The bombers were alleged to have trained in Somalia (green) before returning to Yemen (orange)

Per the Yemeni government, reports emerged that the bombers had attended training camps in Somalia belonging to the local al-Qaeda-linked militant group al-Shabaab. Analyst Gregory D. Johnsen disputed these claims as unsubstantiated and intended for the government to save face. Journalist Abdulelah Haider Shaye, who interviewed Wuhayshi earlier in the year, said he was told AQAP "doesn't need support from Somalia".

Ujayri, the first bombings' perpetrator, was an 18-year-old from Taiz who fled his family home after security forces raided it to arrest him. After wandering through the streets of Sanaa, he was recruited into AQAP's suicide bomber division in October 2008. Government reports claimed Ujayri's recruiter, Omer Hassan al-Mahfali al-Raimi, brought him to an Islamic institution in Sanaa where he resided until December, although this was denied by institution which said Ujayri was not in their records and the alleged time period he was there for was during a holiday. Two months before the bombing, Ujayri's mother received a letter attributed to him in which he defended his choice to embark on jihad and pleaded for her acceptance.

Dhayani was a 20-year-old from Sanaa who "had been traveling far from his family to pursue Islamic studies" according to AQAP, and escaped a security cordon around his family home in an attempt to arrest him before joining AQAP. The group claimed Dhayani and Ujayri befriended each other during their training, and that after the latter's death Dhayani requested that he be given a suicide mission as well, whereupon he was assigned to conduct the second bombing. The AQAP video featured Dhayani being groomed as a suicide bomber as well as his final will and testament, in which he stated to his mother "This is better for me than life in their prisons,... Don't listen to anyone who speaks ill of us."

== Investigation ==
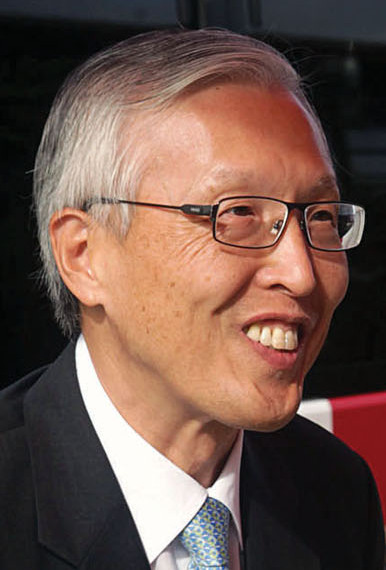
Shin Kak-soo headed a South Korean government meeting after the first bombing.

The Yemeni government immediately launched an inquiry after the first bombing. In South Korea, an emergency meeting between government agencies headed by vice foreign minister Shin Kak-soo led to the dispatch of a response team to Yemen, consisting of two foreign ministry official and representatives from the National Police Agency and National Intelligence Service. They arrived on 16 March and were involved in a preliminary investigation, including an inspection of the crime scene and interviews with Yemeni officials.

Investigators deliberated over the nature of the bombing before it was verified on 16 March. Local authorities arrested 12 Islamists who could have information on the actual perpetrators. By 17 March, the preliminary investigation led by Yemen determined the incident was a "planned suicide bomb attack" but did not establish if the targeting of Koreans was predetermined. Conflicting reports on the perpetrator had also emerged, with the official Saba News Agency initially reporting that he was "tricked by al-Qaeda into wearing an explosives vest". Investigators found his remains and an identity card which indicated his name was Ali Mohsen al-Ahmad. He was later correctly identified as Ujayri. His name appeared in a list of 161 most wanted individuals published by the government earlier in March. Authorities searched his residence and recovered information on those involved in planning the attack.

The South Korean response team intended to remain in Yemen despite the second bombing to continue their investigation into the first incident. They completed their mission and returned to South Korea on 22 March. A senior South Korean official told Yonhap News Agency: "It's too early to conclude the incidents as terrorist attacks against South Koreans, but the possibility remains high given South Korean nationals were attacked twice". Foreign ministry spokesperson Moon Tae-young acknowledged an investigation was ongoing, and said there was uncertainty as to if the bomber intended to target Yemeni officials because the convoy was led by a police car. One official backed this theory by claiming it was a VIP convoy used by the Yemeni president, although Ma disputed this and said it consisted of standard civilian vehicles.

At the site of the second bombing, authorities found an identity card they attributed to the perpetrator, one stating they would search his address. 26 September, a government-affiliated newspaper, published the profiles of 12 individuals who were plotting further attacks for AQAP, offering rewards for information on them. Among those listed was Omer Hassan al-Mahfali al-Raimi, who recruited the first bomber. On 25 March, authorities announced the arrest of six members of the cell, who were accused of planning the two bombings along with 10 other plots against foreign and Western interests. Simultaneously, security forces raided the Islamic institution allegedly linked to Ujayri and detained four students. The school criticized the raid and said those detained were not connected to the bombings. In April, a Yemeni official announced the second bomber was identified through DNA analysis as Dhayani, whose name was listed among the 12 suspects.

On 16 June, while responding to a separate case involving a South Korean killed in Yemen, a foreign ministry official reported the Yemeni government had shared the results of their investigation into the two bombings. They had determined the attackers were not explicitly targeting Koreans but instead general foreigners, and that the attacks were meant as a display of AQAP's strength.

== Response ==
The bombing in Shibam was the first attack conducted by AQAP since its founding earlier in the year. In response to it, South Korea's Ministry of Foreign Affairs and Trade issued a statement offering condolences to the victims and their relatives and promising cooperation with the Yemeni government. After the incident was confirmed as a suicide bombing, another statement was issued condemning the attack and pledging commitment to international cooperation on counterterrorism. Yemen was designated a "travel restriction region" and its danger rating on the ministry's website was raised to level three, on a scale of one to four. The government ordered increased security measures for diplomatic missions as well as further information sharing with terrorism-affected nations.

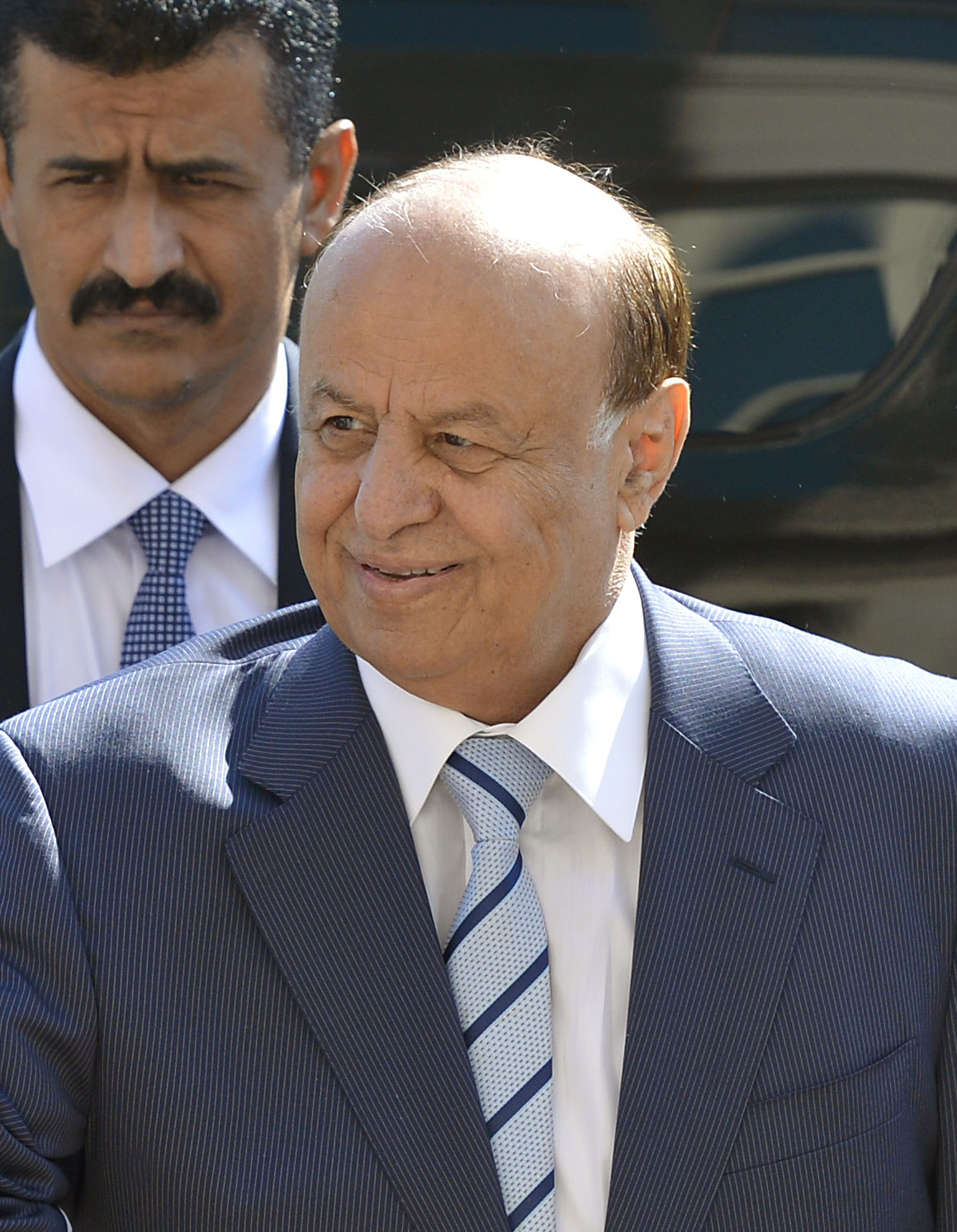
Abdrabbuh Mansour Hadi visited Shibam after the bombing.

A spokesperson for the South Korean embassy in Sanaa emphasized maintaining positive relations with Yemen in the wake of the attack. Yemeni foreign minister Abu Bakr al-Qirbi called his South Korean counterpart, Yu Myung-hwan, and assured him a thorough investigation. Yemeni vice president Abdrabbuh Mansour Hadi headed a high-level government meeting after the bombing and later visited Shibam on 17 March, where he vowed the government would "eradicate all dubious factions who sold their souls to the devil".

After the second bombing, Moon said the South Korean foreign ministry told its diplomatic missions in the Middle East to exercise caution and provide increased security measures for Korean nationals. The next day, he urged South Koreans to leave Yemen and refrain from travelling to it. During a press briefing, United States Department of State spokesman Robert A. Wood called the two attacks were "very troubling". The embassy of the United States in Sanaa issued a travel advisory for Americans in Yemen and increased security measures for its staff.

According to Zaid al-Alaya'a of Yemen Observer, the attacks were widely condemned across Yemen. Tourism in Shibam plummeted, with one local claiming the next year that "happiness left Shibam forever." The second attack in particular led to bipartisan scrutiny within the House of Representatives, with several MPs questioning AQAP's foreknowledge of the convoy's route and suggesting the security forces were compromised. The South Korean community in Yemen, which numbered at up to 200 people, was shocked by the attacks particularly because the second one overtly targeted Koreans. Community leader John Park said Koreans at large were now viewing Yemen as incredibly dangerous, while many of them were considering leaving the country. He added the Korean community did not "think Yemen is so dangerous, but it has problems."

JoongAng Ilbo editorial writer Kim Jin criticized the response to the attacks in South Korea on multiple levels as inadequate, citing a lack of acknowledgement from the political sphere, including President Lee Myung-bak, the National Assembly or major political parties, and diminished coverage from Korean news broadcasting and web portals. Along with acknowledging South Korea's lack of connection to Yemen and concerns of prolonged coverage provoking terrorists to attack more Koreans, he suggested Korean society may be traumatized by previous acts of jihadist terrorism against Koreans and was therefore reluctant to voice a strong reaction to the attacks. The government also received criticism for not providing adequate information on dangerous areas for tourists, with Korea Association of Travel Agents director Cho Kyu-seok recommending further promotion of country safety levels on the foreign ministry's website.

== Analysis ==
Prasanta Kumar Pradhan of the Manohar Parrikar Institute for Defence Studies and Analyses noted the targeting of South Koreans was an exception to previous attacks on foreigners in Yemen, which had almost exclusively targeted Americans and Westerners. The Hankyoreh suggested that although the target of first bombing may have been incidental, AQAP specifically targeted South Koreans in the second bombing "after seeing the considerable effects of the first incident in South Korea and internationally". Korea Research Institute on Terrorism director Choi Jin-tae argued the attacks were either meant to undermine the Yemeni government and tourism industry or were directed at South Korea in response to its deployment of naval assets in the Gulf of Aden as part of the US-led multinational anti-piracy operations in Somalia, which AQAP may have interpreted as a smokescreen to launch counterterrorism operations against them in Yemen. J. Peter Pham cited the alleged training of the bombers by al-Shabaab as a potential example of independent development of relations between al-Qaeda affiliates.

Writing for the Combating Terrorism Center journal CTC Sentinel, analyst Brian O'Neill considered the two attacks a demonstration of AQAP's growing strength and sophistication. As for the first bombing, he noted the usage of a ground operative as a newer, more flexible tactic in Yemen borrowed from other jihadist theatres, and the fact that the bomber likely targeted the South Koreans due to their group's large size as indicative of quality training. He regarded the second bombing as a psychological victory, offering two different theories on its nature; it was either planned alongside the first bombing, which displays "foresight to maximize the impact of their assaults", or was organized off immediate newfound information, which reflected on the group's operational capacity.

O'Neill further highlighted AQAP's digital propaganda, calling the claim of responsibility for the first bombing a "minor masterpiece" which acknowledged both international agendas and domestic objectives. Citing the attack as revenge for the killing of Qaiti was considered by him "a tit-for-tat justification... tying themselves into the fabric of Yemeni culture". It would also further their appeal among the tribes of Yemen which held similar anti-government views. Lowy Institute contributor Sarah Phillips said the attacks were "demonstrations of strength and of the perpetrators' ability to create crises" and would help bolster AQAP's reputation with the tribes.

== See also ==
- 2007 South Korean hostage crisis in Afghanistan
- Killing of Kim Sun-il
