= Al-Mukhtar al-Qasim =

Zaydi imams of Yemen

Al-Mukhtar al-Qasim (died 956) was an imam of the Zaidi state in Yemen who held or claimed power from 936 to 956.

Al-Qasim bin Ahmad was the eldest son of the imam an-Nasir Ahmad, who died in 934. An-Nasir's death ushered into a period of internal political turbulence among the Zaidis of highland Yemen. His third son, al-Muntakhab al-Hasan, demanded the imamate, but the latter's elder brother, al-Mukhtar al-Qasim lodged counterclaims. Al-Muntakhab died in 936; however, a younger brother called al-Mansur Yahya is recognized by Zaidi historiography as the legitimate successor of an-Nasir after 934. He was supported by the majority of the Zaidis after al-Muntakhab's death. In 956, al-Mukhtar al-Qasim, who ruled from his base in Sa'dah, was able to seize the important commercial and political centre San'a, which had hitherto mostly belonged to the rival Yu'firid Dynasty. However, before the year was over, al-Mukhtar was murdered by a powerful lord from Hamdan, Muhammad bin ad-Dahhak. With his death, San'a temporarily reverted to the Yafurids.

== See also ==
- Imams of Yemen
- History of Yemen

Preceded by al-Muntakhab al-Hasan	Zaydi Imam of Yemen; 936–956	Succeeded by al-Mansur Yahya
