= Shibam Kawkaban district =

Shibām Kawkabān District مـديـريـة شـبـام كـوكـبـان
- District
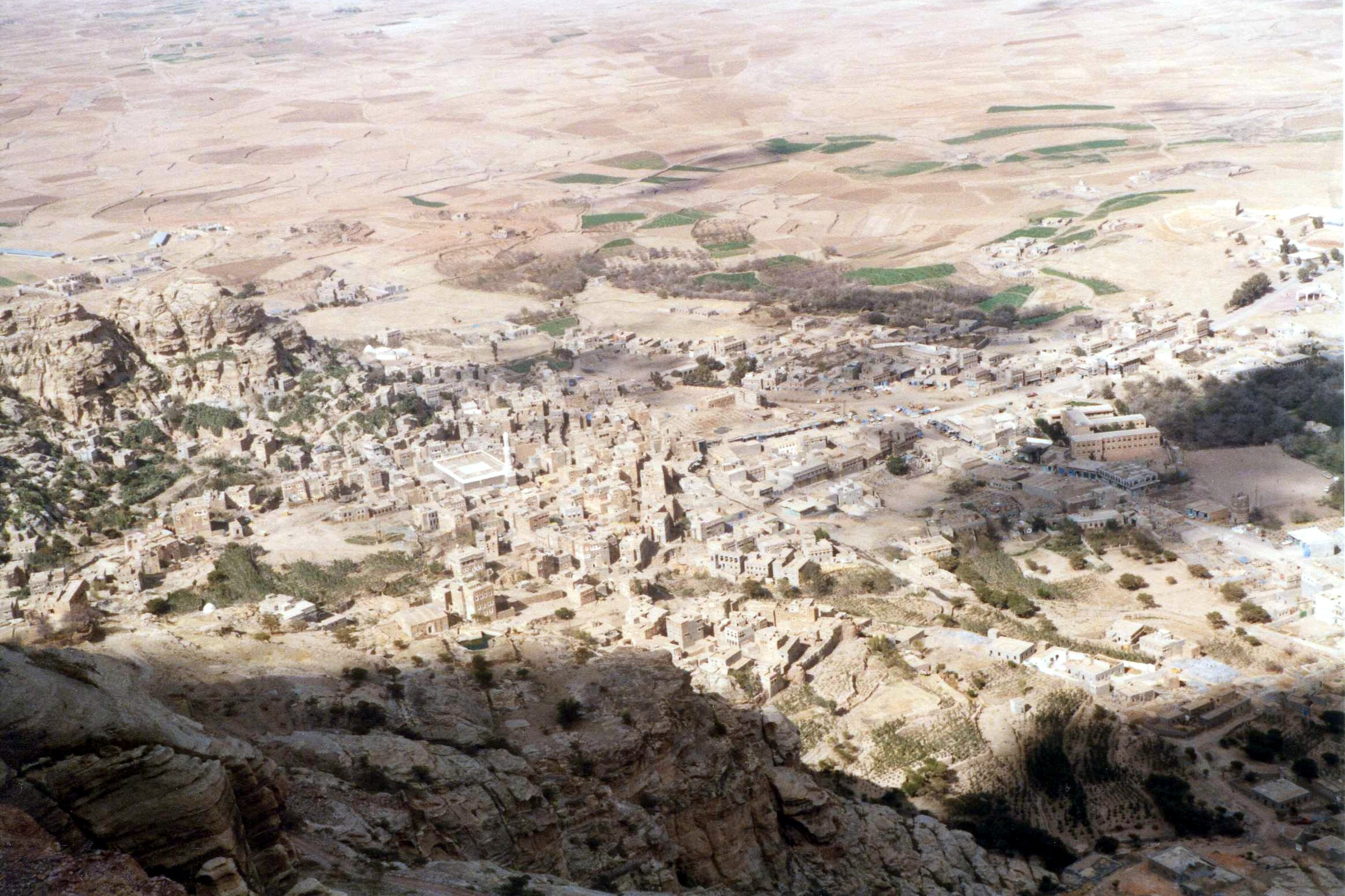
- View from Kawkaban
- Interactive map of Shibām Kawkabān District
- Coordinates: 15°22′N 43°45′E
- Country: Yemen
- Governorate: Al Mahwit

Population (2003)
  - Total: 39,163
- Time zone: UTC+3 (Yemen Standard Time)

Shibam Kawkaban District (Arabic: مـديـريـة شـبـام كـوكـبـان) is a district of the Al Mahwit Governorate, Yemen. As of 2003, the district had a population of 39,163 inhabitants.

== See also ==
- Middle East
- Shibam District
- South Arabia
