= An-Nasir Ahmad (Zaidi imam) =

Third imam of the Zaidiyyah state

An-Nasir Ahmad (died 5 June 934) was the third imam of the Zaidi state in Yemen. Through his active leadership he confirmed and expanded the polity founded by his two predecessors.

== Early years and succession ==
Ahmad bin Yahya was born in Medina (present-day Saudi Arabia) as the son of the later imam al-Hadi ila'l-Haqq Yahya and Fatimah bint Al-Hasan. In 897 he followed his father and his brother Muhammad to Yemen, where al-Hadi was acknowledged as the first imam of the Zaydiyya branch of Shi'a Islam in Yemen. By 907 he was assisting his father as military commander. After a sojourn in Medina he returned to the Zaidi capital in Yemen, Sa'dah, where he was chosen to succeed his brother al-Murtada Muhammad in September 913. Al-Murtada had abdicated in 912 under somewhat unclear circumstances, and seemingly supported the appointment of Ahmad. The new imam took the honorific title an-Nasir Ahmad. He was considered an efficacious ruler; one of his adherents composed a panegyric text which described the imam as the one who strengthened Islam after it had become weak.

== Fighting the Fatimids ==
The long reign of an-Nasir Ahmad was filled with struggles against the adherents of the Fatimids, who also had a strong following in parts of Yemen. The imam gathered troops among the tribesmen of Hamdan, Najran and Khawlan to fight the Fatimid da'i. In January 920 he met the Ismailite leader Abd al-Hamid of Jabal Maswar in a three-days battle at Nughash outside San'a. Abd al-Hamid suffered a disastrous defeat which shattered the Ismailite influence in Yemen irrevocably. After a fairly successful rule, an-Nasir Ahmad died in 934 (or, according to other sources, in 927 or 937). He left six sons, called al-Mukhtar al-Qasim, Isma'il, al-Muntakhab al-Hasan, Ja'far, al-Mansur Yahya, and Ali. Three of these claimed the imamate after him, and the Zaidi state entered a fairly obscure period.

== See also ==
- Rassids
- Imams of Yemen

Preceded by al-Murtada Muhammad	Zaydi Imam of Yemen; 913–934	Succeeded by al-Muntakhab al-Hasan
