= Khaywan =

Khaywan خيان
- Town
- Location in Yemen
- Coordinates: 16.27978°N 44.06591°E
- Country: Yemen
- Governorate: Amran
- District: Huth
- Elevation: 5,344 ft (1,629 m)
- Time zone: UTC+3 (Yemen Standard Time)

Khaywan (Arabic: خيوان, romanized: Khaywān) is an old town and corresponding 'uzlah in Huth District of Amran Governorate, Yemen.

== History ==
Khaywan is an ancient settlement, attested in pre-Islamic inscriptions. According to Ibn al-Kalbi, in pre-Islamic times, the god Ya'uq was worshipped here. Early medieval texts indicate that Khaywan was an important stopping place on the pilgrimage route from Sanaa to Mecca at the time. It was the third stage on that route, after Raydah and Athafit. The 9th-century writer Ya'qubi listed Khaywan as one of the 84 mikhlafs of Yemen. The 10th-century writer al-Hamdani described Khaywan as the main settlement of the Hashid tribe, and named after one Malik b. Zayd, who was also called Khaywan and was a descendant of Hashid. It declined later on, perhaps due to the rise of nearby Huth, and is mentioned less frequently in later texts.

In the year 286 AH (899-900 CE), Khaywan was the site of a major rebellion against Al-Hadi ila'l-Haqq Yahya, the Imam of Yemen. The rebellion was led by one Ibn al-Dahhak (presumably to be identified with Abu Ja'far Ahmad ibn Muhammad), who led a nighttime attack on Khaywan after al-Hadi had left for Athafit, while his son Abu'l-Qasim had stayed behind. This led to a battle on Sunday, 15 Sha'ban, where al-Hadi fought personally on foot. The rebels were defeated, and al-Hadi had their houses and vineyards destroyed, but Ibn al-Dahhak himself managed to escape capture.
