= Al-Murtada Muhammad =

Al-Murtada Muhammad (891? - 1 May 922) was the second imam of the Zaidi state of Yemen, who ruled from 911 to 912 and was a respected religious scholar.

== Youth ==
Muhammad bin Yahya was a Sayyid who was born in Hijaz. The year of birth was allegedly 891, although it may actually have been earlier than that. He followed his father al-Hadi ila'l-Haqq Yahya to Yemen in 897, where the latter was acknowledged as imam by the tribal groups of the northern highland, conforming to the Zaydiyya version of Shi'a Islam. During the following years, Muhammad assisted his father in various political and military affairs. He also made a name as a religious authority and a poet. In June 903, he was taken captive by the Yu'firids, political rivals in the Yemeni highland. He spent several months in a prison before he was released. After 906 he was several times confronted with the aggressive Fatimid lord Ali bin al-Fadl.

== Reign and abdication ==
After the death of al-Hadi ila'l-Haqq Yahya in 911, Muhammad was chosen to succeed him. As imam, he took the name al-Murtada Muhammad. However, the new imam felt frustrated about the moral laxity of the Yemeni population, who were slow to change their old habits. After a brief reign he abdicated in the month of Dhu al-Qadah, probably in July 912. He appears to have supported the succession of his brother an-Nasir Ahmad to the imamate. He withdrew to a life of scholarship and contemplation and died in Sa'dah, the centre of Zaydiyya rule, in May 922. As a diligent scholar and poet, he wrote several works, in particular about Zaidi rites.

Preceded by al-Hadi ila'l-Haqq Yahya	Imam of Yemen; 911–912	Succeeded by an-Nasir Ahmad
