= Shibam district =

Coordinates: 15°55′N 48°35′E

Shibam District مـديـريـة شـبـام
- District
- Interactive map of Shibam District
- Country: Yemen
- Governorate: Hadhramaut
- Seat: Shibam

Population (2021)
  - Total: 77,583
- Time zone: UTC+3 (Yemen Standard Time)

Shibam District (Arabic: مـديـريـة شـبـام) is a district of the Hadhramaut Governorate, Yemen. Its capital is the town of Shibam, famous for its mudbrick-made tower houses and known as the "Manhattan of the desert". During the Yemen Civil War, the city suffered some damage.

As of 2021, the district had a population of 77,583 inhabitants.

== See also ==
- Middle East
- Shibam Kawkaban District
- South Arabia
