= Al-Muntakhab al-Hasan =

Al-Muntakhab al-Hasan (died 936) was an imam of the Zaidi state in Yemen in the period 934–936. He was the fourth ruler of the Rassid Dynasty

Al-Hasan bin Ahmad was the third of the six sons of imam an-Nasir Ahmad. An-Nasir Ahmad had been a powerful ruler who had consolidated Zaydiyyah influence in the Yemeni highland, but after his death in 934 the imamate entered into a rather uncertain period. The rival Yu'firid Dynasty controlled Sa'dah, the residence of the Rassids, for four months after an-Nasir's demise. Then al-Hasan claimed the imamate, with the regnal name al-Muntakhab al-Hasan. However, his elder brother al-Mukhtar al-Qasim was set up as a rival imam. Neither al-Mutakhab al-Hasan nor al-Mukhtar al-Qasim are listed in the later Zaidi chronicles, which count the imamate of their younger brother al-Mansur Yahya as starting from 934. The death of al-Muntakhab al-Hasan is dated in 936 by the historian Ibn Khaldun; another text says 939. The next important Rassid figure was his brother al-Mukhtar al-Qasim.

== See also ==
- Imams of Yemen
- History of Yemen

| Preceded by an-Nasir Ahmad | Zaydi Imam of Yemen; 934–936 | Succeeded by al-Mukhtar al-Qasim |
