= Al-Hadi ila'l-Haqq Yahya =

9th- and 10th-century Arab religious leader; founder of the Zaydi Imamate in Yemen

Al-Hadi ila'l-Haqq
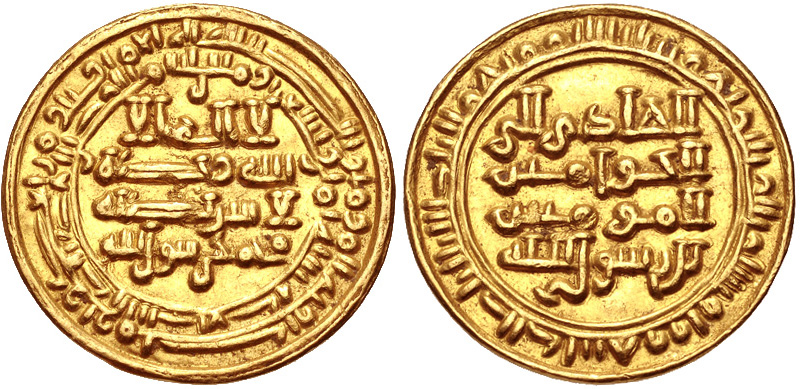
- Gold dinar of al-Hadi, minted at Sa'dah in 910/11 CE

Zaydi Imam of Yemen
- Reign: 897 – 18 August 911
- Successor: Muhammad
- Born: 859 al-Rass, near Medina, Hejaz
- Died: August 19, 911; Sa'dah, Yemen
- Issue: Muhammad; Ahmad
Names
- Abu'l-Husayn Yahya ibn al-Husayn al-Hasani
- House: Rassids
- Father: al-Husayn ibn al-Qasim al-Rassi

Yahya; يحيى

20th Zaydi Imam
- In office 860–911
- Preceded by: Al-Qasim al-Rassi
- Succeeded by: Al-Murtada Muhammad

Religious life
- Religion: Islam

Abūʾl-Ḥusayn Yaḥyā ibn al-Ḥusayn ibn al-Qāsim ibn Ibrāhīm Ṭabāṭabā al-Ḥasanī (al-Rass/Medina, 859 – Sa'dah, 18 August 911), better known by his honorific title of al-Hādī ilāʾl-Ḥaqq (Arabic: الهادي الى الحق, lit. 'the Guide to the Truth'), was a religious and political leader in the Arabian Peninsula. He was the first Zaydi imam who ruled portions of Yemen from 897 to 911. He is also the ancestor of the Rassid dynasty which ruled Yemen intermittently until the North Yemen Civil War in 1962.

== Origin and family ==
According to the later Zaydi sources, Yahya ibn al-Husayn was born in Medina in 859. However, it appears that he was actually born at a village (likely modern al-Dur or Dur Abi al-Qasim, some 57 kilometres (35 mi) southwest of Medina) near the wadi al-Rass, where his grandfather, al-Qasim "al-Rassi", had settled after bringing his family over from Egypt around 827. He was on both sides of his family a descendant of al-Hasan, a son of Ali ibn Abu Talib, the son-in-law of Muhammad and first Shi'a imam: his father al-Husayn was a great-great-grandson of al-Hasan's grandson Ibrahim al-Shibh, while his mother, Umm al-Hasan Fatima, was a great-great-granddaughter of al-Hasan's grandson Da'ud.

Yahya was born into a particularly prominent branch of the Hasanid line. His grandfather, al-Qasim al-Rassi, was one of the chief authorities of the Zaydi school of Shi'a Islam, and was honoured as "Star of the Family of the Prophet of God" (Najm Āl Rasūl Allāh) and "Interpreter of the Faith" (Turjumān al-Dīn). Al-Qasim's brother, Ibn Tabataba, raised a rebellion against the Abbasid Caliphate at Kufa in 814. Yahya's father, al-Husayn, was of lesser status, but was accounted a learned man and esteemed as a reliable transmitter of hadiths.

Yahya married his paternal first cousin, Fatima. The couple had nine sons: Muhammad, Ahmad, al-Hasan, Yahya, Isma'il, al-Husayn, Abdallah, Ja'far, and Isa. Both Muhammad and Ahmad would succeed their father as imams, and most of the imams of Yemen descend from Ahmad. Of the 73 imams of Yemen who followed Yahya, 60 were his direct descendants, and six of the rest were descended from his brother, Abdallah, and his uncle, Muhammad.

== Early life ==
Already at a very young age, Yahya distinguished himself for his character and intelligence: he was strong, brave, and well versed in Islamic jurisprudence (fiqh), to the extent that at the age of seventeen he could compose treatises and issue judgments. As a result, his family quickly came to regard him as a suitable candidate for the imamate. In Zaydi doctrine, the imam has to be a "Fatimid", i.e. a descendant of Muhammad's daughter Fatimah and her sons, al-Hasan and al-Husayn, but the position is not hereditary or by appointment (naṣṣ), unlike in the Twelver and Isma'ili traditions of Shi'a Islam. Instead, it can be claimed by any qualified Fatimid who fulfills a number (usually 14) of stringent conditions (religious learning, piety, bravery, etc.), by "rising" (khurūj) and "calling" (daʿwa) for the allegiance of the faithful. Zaydi doctrine emphasized that the imamate was not contingent on popular acclaim or election; the very act of daʿwa denotes God's choice. On the other hand, if a more excellent candidate appears, the incumbent imam is obliged to acknowledge him. Both al-Qasim al-Rassi, and Yahya's maternal great-grandfather, Muhammad ibn Sulayman ibn Da'ud, are considered as imams by the Zaydis. Later Zaydi tradition associated prophecies about Yahya's eventual imamate, both by his grandfather al-Qasim, as well as by the Islamic prophet Muhammad himself.

Like all Shi'a imams, Yahya was opposed to the Abbasid Caliphate, but was also well aware of the failure of all past attempts by Shi'a candidates to stage a successful military uprising against the Abbasids, most notably the uprising of Muhammad al-Nafs al-Zakiyya in 762, the revolt of al-Husayn ibn Ali al-Abid in 786, and a number of failed Zaydi risings in the early 9th century. These failures had obliged his grandfather to abstain from proclaiming his daʿwa in public, even though his claim to the imamate had been recognized by various communities from the Hejaz, Iraq and Persia, who had sent him pledges of allegiance. The common factor of these revolts was that they had happened in the heartlands of the Islamic world—Iraq and the Hejaz—typically beginning with a public proclamation at Medina or Mecca. In marked contrast to their failures, anti-Abbasid movements on the periphery of the caliphate were more successful: Idris ibn Abdallah, fleeing from the suppression of the revolt of al-Husayn ibn Ali al-Abid, had founded a Zaydi state in what is now Morocco, while a distant relative of Yahya's, Hasan ibn Zayd, had founded a Zaydi state in Tabaristan, a mountainous region on the southern shores of the Caspian Sea.

Between 884 and 889, Yahya and his family visited Tabaristan, then ruled by Muhammad ibn Zayd, a brother of the founder of the Zaydi state there. The family settled at Amol, the local capital, while the Zaydi imams were at the eastern region of Jurjan. Yahya quickly attracted attention, as his own uncles and cousins took to proclaiming him as the candidate for the imamate. These stories suggest that Yahya may have contemplated declaring his daʿwa at Amol. At any rate, the rumours surrounding him aroused the suspicions of Muhammad ibn Zayd, who was already ruling as imam. A khurūj by Yahya would inevitably be a challenge to Muhammad to relinquish his authority, and the latter's expected refusal would lead to an armed clash between the supporters of the two rivals. Yahya assured Muhammad that he had no such plans, but he soon learned of a plot to have him and his family arrested, forcing them to abandon Tabaristan in haste. The family returned to the Hejaz, but Yahya appears to have also briefly visited the Abbasid capital, Baghdad.

== Activity in Yemen ==
Main towns in Yemen in the 9th century

In 893/4, Yahya for the first time journeyed to the Yemen, on the invitation of the powerful Banu Futaym clan, living in the northern region of Sa'dah, in order to settle their disputes. The Yemen was at the time a troubled province of the Abbasid empire. Caliphal authority had traditionally been weak and mostly limited to the capital, Sana'a, while in the rest of the country tribal conflicts, sometimes dating to pre-Islamic times, persisted. At the time of Yahya's arrival, the country was politically fragmented and only loosely under Abbasid suzerainty. Much of the interior was held by the Yu'firid dynasty, who as Sunnis recognized the overlordship of the Abbasids. After capturing Sana'a in 861, their rule extended from Sa'dah in the north to al-Janad (northeast of Taiz) in the south and Hadramawt in the east. A rival dynasty, the Ziyadids, also nominally loyal to the Abbasids, held Zabid on the western coastal plain, and at times exercised significant control over wide portions of the interior of the country. The Banu Manakh family ruled the southern highlands around Taiz, while the northern parts of the country were in practice dominated by warring tribes owing allegiance to no-one. The lack of political unity, the remoteness of the province and its inaccessible terrain, along with deep-rooted Shi'a sympathies in the local population, made Yemen "manifestly fertile territory for any charismatic leader equipped with tenacity and political acumen to realise his ambitions". Furthermore, the distance to the other Zaydi state at Tabaristan meant that here, Yahya would not have to contend with a rival Zaydi imam.

Yahya's first attempt was cut short. He reached al-Sharafah, some distance from Sana'a, but was then forced to turn back due to indiscipline among his own men, and returned to al-Fara, southwest of Medina. A new opportunity offered itself three years later, when the same tribal leaders invited Yahya to come back and end the strife-torn conditions of northern Yemen. He arrived in Sa'dah on 15 March 897. Shortly after, he proclaimed his daʿwa and assumed the title of commander of the faithful, with the regnal name of al-Hādī ilāʾl-Ḥaqq ("the Guide to the Truth"), or al-Hadi for short.

Al-Hadi quickly secured his control the environs of Sa'dah, which became his capital and base of operations. Already in July 897, he was able to subjugate the Najran region, concluding a special treaty with the numerous local non-Muslim populace. He then set his sights on Sana'a, whose governor, Abu'l-Atahiyah of the Tarif family, in 899 switched his support from the Yu'firids to him. The prolonged and changeful struggle for control of Sana'a would dominate al-Hadi's reign, and highlight the limitations of his regime. On 19 January 901, al-Hadi entered the city in person. He struck coins and the khutbah was read in his name. This was opposed by the Yu'firids, however, and Sana'a rapidly changed hands between him and the Yu'firid ruler Abd al-Qahir. By this time the imam suffered from poor health, and his tribal supporters were unreliable. Eventually he left the city to its fate in May 902, being carried back to Sa'dah in a litter. A new expedition against Sana'a was undertaken in the next year but led to another defeat, in which al-Hadi's son Muhammad was captured by the Yu'firids.

Al-Hadi was not the only Shi'a leader who had tried to propagate his doctrine in Yemen: already in 881, two missionaries of the rival Isma'ili sect had arrived in the country, Ibn Hawshab and Ali ibn al-Fadl. They too exploited the political fragmentation of the country to establish bases of operations: Ibn Hawshab in the mountains northwest of Sana'a, and Ibn al-Fadl in the highlands north of Aden. In November 905, Ibn al-Fadl captured Sana'a, which allowed Ibn Hawshab to in turn seize the Yu'firid capital of Shibam. With the exception of al-Hadi's domain around Sa'ada in the north, Ziyadid-ruled Zabid on the western coast, and Aden in the south, almost all of Yemen was now under Isma'ili control.

Al-Hadi's own campaign into the western coast, which likely took place in 905, was unsuccessful, but the local leaders opposed to Ibn al-Fadl invited al-Hadi to come to their aid, and in April 906, he again captured Sana'a. This occupation also did not last long, as he quarreled with As'ad ibn Abi Yu'fir, and left the city in November of the same year, allowing the Isma'ilis to recapture Sana'a. Al-Hadi's rule over northern Yemen was also constantly challenged by tribal rebellions, especially by the Banu'l-Harith tribe of Najran, who in 908 overthrew and killed their Zaydi governor. Al-Hadi, plagued by illness, was unable to restore his control over the province. In 910, al-Hadi exploited Ibn al-Fadl's absence on campaign to the western coastal plain to once more occupy Sana'a on 7 April, but was forced to abandon it again on 23 June.

== Death ==
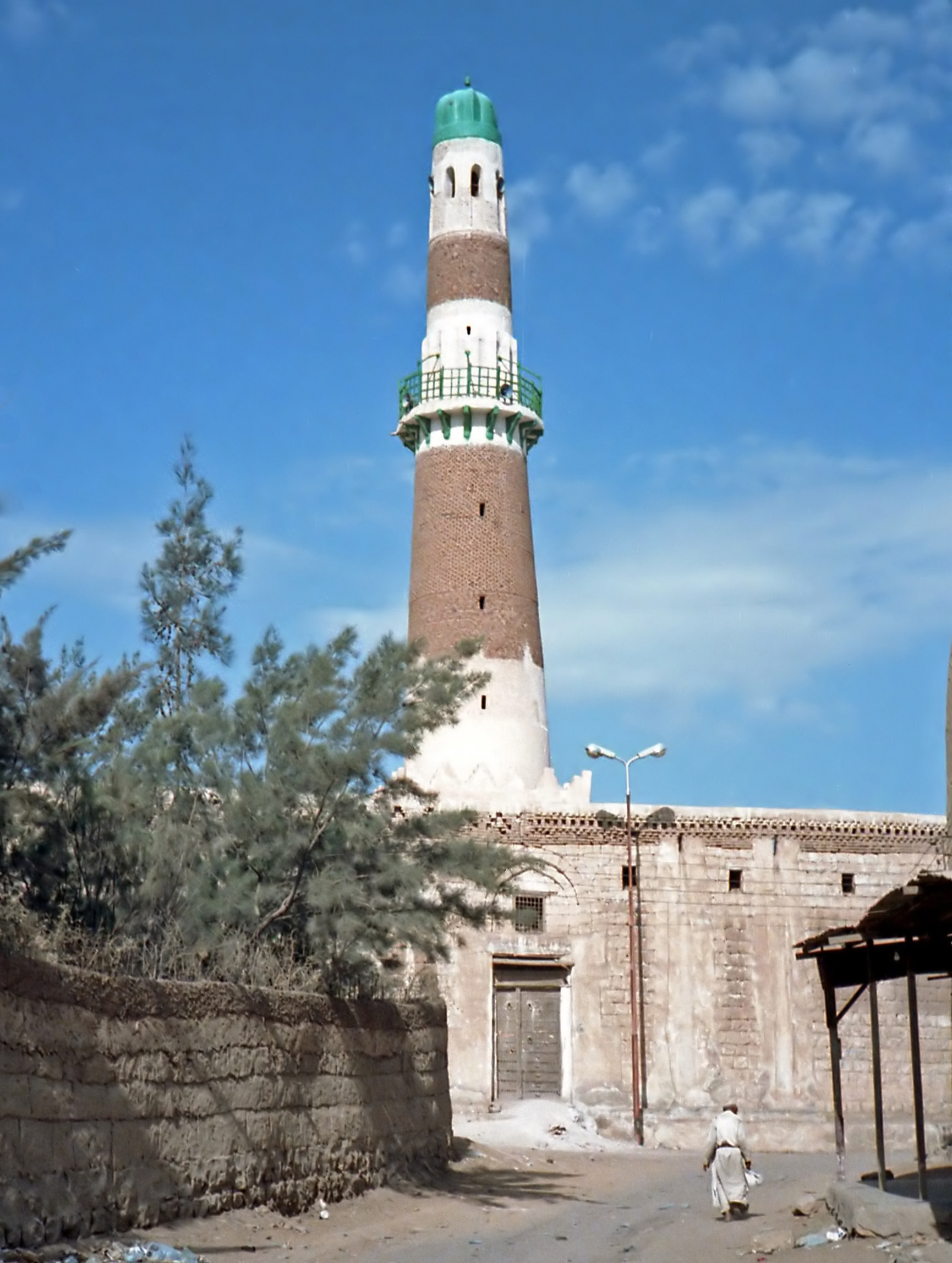
The Mosque of al-Hadi in Sa'dah, in 1986

Al-Hadi died at Sa'dah on 18 August 911. His tomb is adjacent to the al-Hadi mosque in Sa'dah, which is named after him and one of the oldest buildings of Islamic Yemen. It has been a site of pilgrimage for Zaydi faithful since. He was succeeded in his dignity by his son Muhammad.

== Legacy ==
Al-Hadi's reign was marked by instability: he could only rely on the loyalty of his own relatives, other Alids, and a small number of "Ṭabarīs", Zaydi followers from Tabaristan, who arrived in 898 and 902. Although al-Hadi was not always a successful ruler, he made a lasting impression on the tribal groups in the Yemeni highland, successfully propagating the Zaydi ideology of Islam – it has actually been argued that it was the Zaydis who seriously introduced Islam in Yemen. Personally, he had the strength, courage and religious knowledge that were a prerequisite for the imamate. He was believed to have fought 70 battles, and was reportedly so strong that he could obliterate the stamp on a coin with his fingers.

Al-Hadi saw himself as the restorer of Muslim beliefs, as seen from quotations of his works: "I revived the Book of God after it had perished", or "I revive the Book and the Sunna which have been rejected". Al-Hadi's ideas were based on those of his grandfather, but with some changes to more mainstream Shi'a views. His views on jurisprudence were laid down in two books, the unfinished Kitāb al-Aḥkām written by al-Hadi himself, and the Kitāb al-Muntakhab, compiled by his follower, Muhammad ibn Sulayman al-Kufi. Al-Hadi's work was adopted by the Yemeni Zaydis, where it was elaborated on by his two sons and immediate successors, as well as some of the Zaydis of Tabaristan, where it was elaborated by the imams al-Mu'ayyad bi'llah and Abu Talib al-Natiq. In his theology, he relied mostly on Mu'tazili doctrines rather than those of his grandfather; but although some later sources claim that he studied under the Mu'tazili leader Abu'l-Qasim al-Balkhi, this is unlikely.

He took great care to collect taxes according to the religious scriptures, but also to avoid abuses and arbitrary tax harvesting. On the other hand, there was still no formal administrative apparatus or fixed pattern of succession, and in some respects the Zaydi regime was hardly a state at all. The imam had to rely on tribal support, but also did his best to Command the Right and Forbid the Wrong (al-amr bi'l-nar'uf wa-'l nahy 'an al-munkar), and to administer Islamic justice and law. In 898, al-Hadi captured the towns of Khaywan and Athafit, south of Sa'dah.

Al-Hadi's religious teachings were in many respects strict, adhering to the school of his grandfather and Zayd bin Ali. He strove for a community where the imam, as the divinely designated leader, ensured the spiritual welfare of the people. For example, he expected women to be veiled, and soldiers to share the spoils in accordance to the Qur’an. He also tried to force the dhimmis of Najran to sell back any land they had bought in the Islamic period, but in the end he had to modify this. Al-Hadi's subjects in the northern highland were not always content with the austere code of conduct that the imam tried to impose. Those who invited him had expected a prestigious mediator in their intratribal conflicts, rather than someone who tried to implement strict Islamic precepts. The career of al-Hadi (and of his successors) was therefore turbulent, as he tried to discipline rebellious and ostensibly sinful subjects.

== See also ==
- Imams of Yemen
- History of Yemen
- Islamic history of Yemen

== Sources ==
- Eagle, A. B. D. R. (1994). "Al-Hādī Yahyā b. al-Husayn b. al-Qāsim (245–98/859–911): A Biographical Introduction and the Background and Significance of his Imamate". New Arabian Studies. 2: 103–122. ISSN 1351-4709.
- Halm, Heinz (1991). Das Reich des Mahdi: Der Aufstieg der Fatimiden [The Empire of the Mahdi: The Rise of the Fatimids] (in German). Munich: C. H. Beck. ISBN 978-3-406-35497-7.
- Kay, Henry Cassels, ed. (1892). Yaman: Its Early Mediæval History, by Najm ad-Din ʿOmāarah al-Ḥakami. Also the Abridged History of Its Dynasties by Ibn Khaldūn, and an Account of the Karmathians of Yaman by Abu ʿAbd Allah Baha ad-Din al-Janadi. London: Edward Arnold.
- Landau-Tasseron, Ella (1990). "Zaydī Imams as Restorers of Religion: Iḥyāʾ and Tajdīd in Zaydī Literature". Journal of Near Eastern Studies. 49 (3): 247–263. doi:10.1086/373443. ISSN 0022-2968. JSTOR 546245. S2CID 162385880.
- Landau-Tasseron, Ella (2010). "Arabia". In Robinson, Chase F. (ed.). The New Cambridge History of Islam, Volume 1: The Formation of the Islamic World, Sixth to Eleventh Centuries. Cambridge: Cambridge University Press. pp. 397–447. ISBN 978-0-521-83823-8.
- Madelung, W. (1971). "Imāma". In Lewis, B.; Ménage, V. L.; Pellat, Ch. & Schacht, J. (eds.). The Encyclopaedia of Islam, Second Edition. Volume III: H–Iram. Leiden: E. J. Brill. pp. 1163–1169. OCLC 495469525.
- Madelung, W. (1991). "Manṣūr al-Yaman". In Bosworth, C. E.; van Donzel, E. & Pellat, Ch. (eds.). The Encyclopaedia of Islam, Second Edition. Volume VI: Mahk–Mid. Leiden: E. J. Brill. pp. 438–439. ISBN 978-90-04-08112-3.
- Madelung, W. (2004). "al-Ḥādī Ila 'l-Ḥaḳḳ". In Bearman, P. J.; Bianquis, Th.; Bosworth, C. E.; van Donzel, E. & Heinrichs, W. P. (eds.). The Encyclopaedia of Islam, Second Edition. Volume XII: Supplement. Leiden: E. J. Brill. pp. 334–335. ISBN 978-90-04-13974-9.
- Serjeant, R. B.; Lewcock, Ronald, eds. (1983). Ṣan'ā': an Arabian Islamic City. London: World of Islam Festival Trust. ISBN 0905035046.
- van Arendonk, Cornelis (1960) [1919]. Les débuts de l'imāmat zaidite au Yemen [The Beginnings of the Zaydi Imamate in the Yemen] (in French). Translated by Jacques Ryckmans. Leiden: E. J. Brill. ISBN 978-90-04-00715-4.

New title	Zaydi Imam of Yemen; 897–911	Succeeded by al-Murtada Muhammad
