= Shibam =

Shibam شِبَام (Arabic)
- Town
- Old Walled City of Shibam
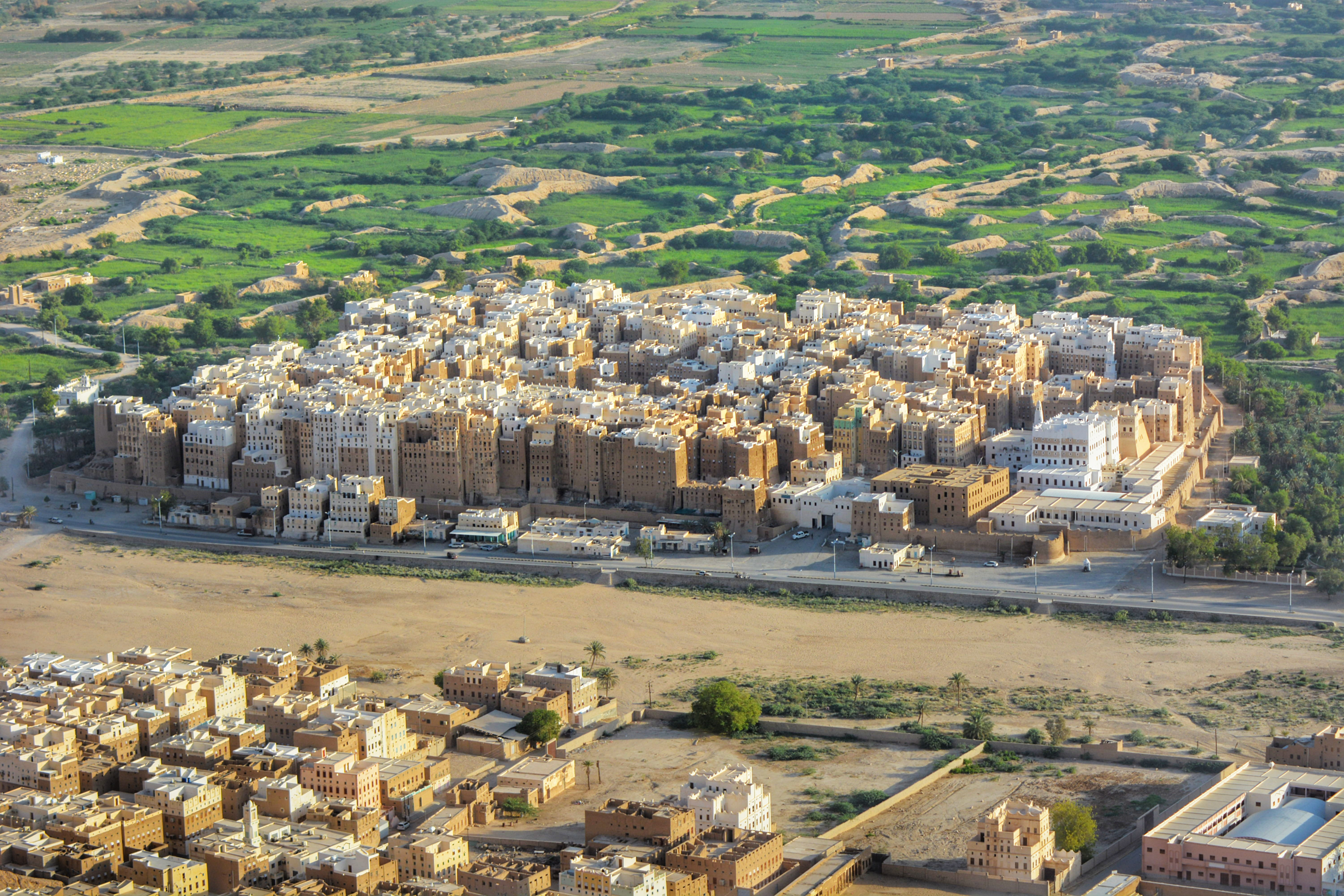
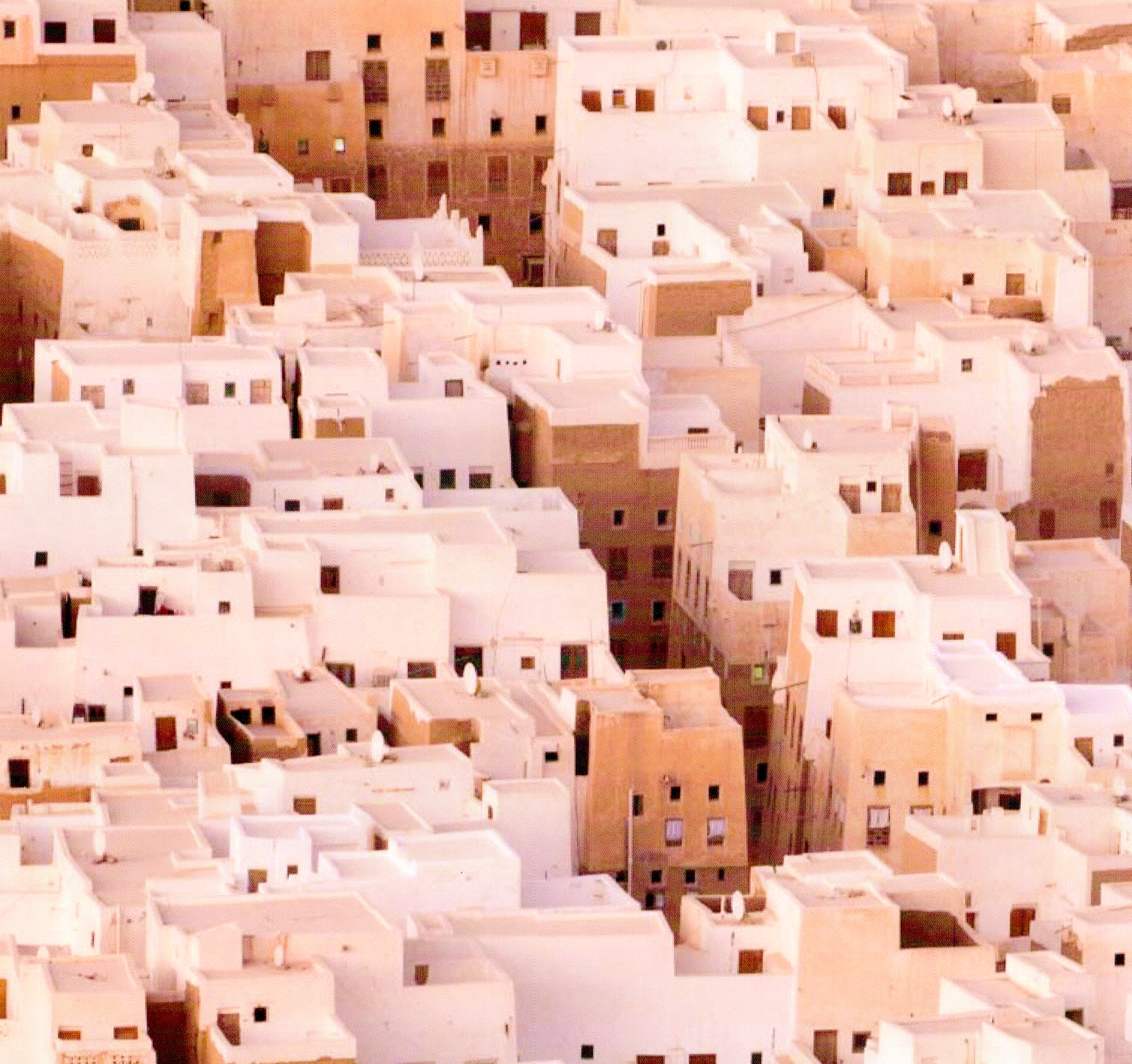
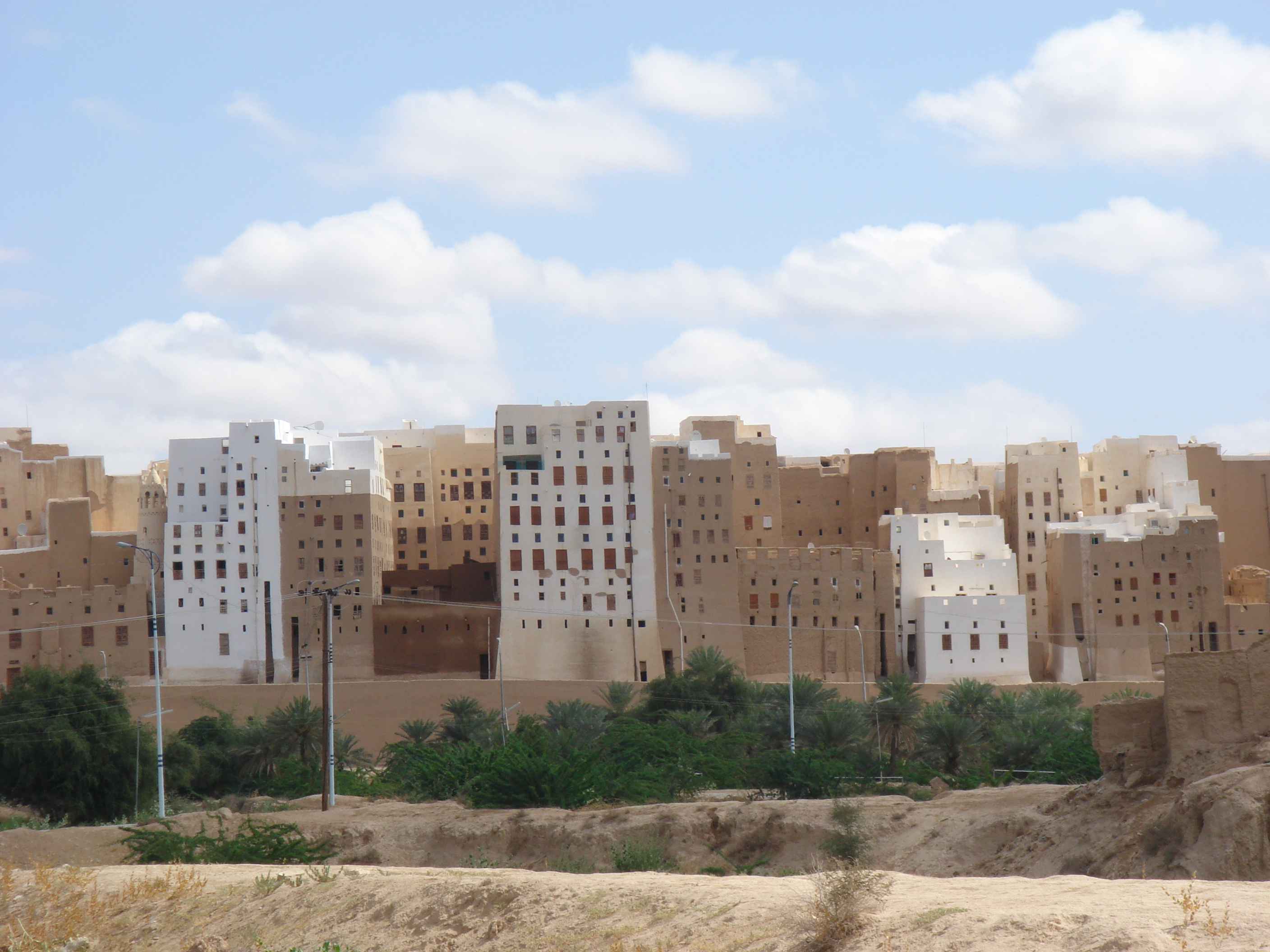
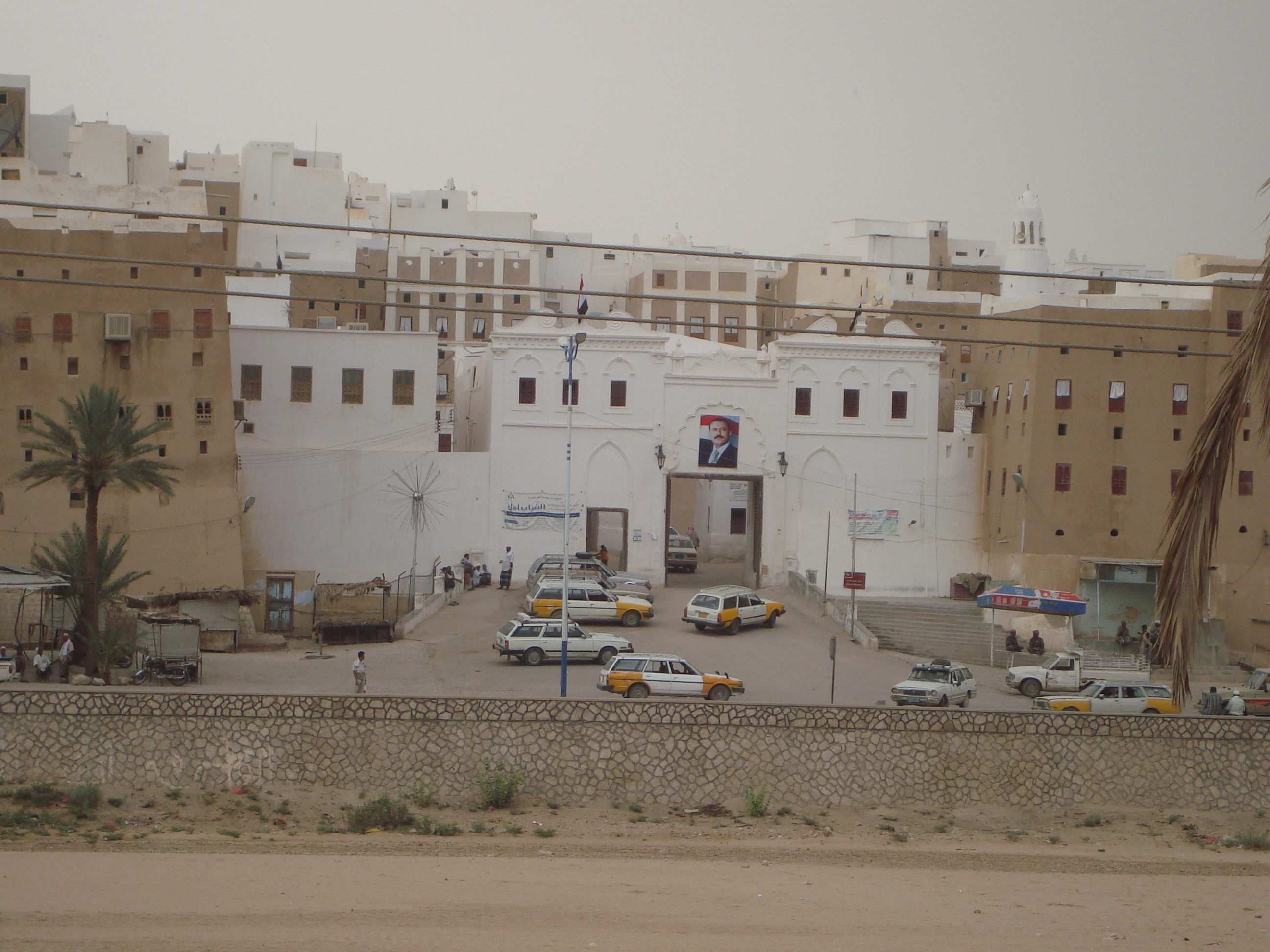
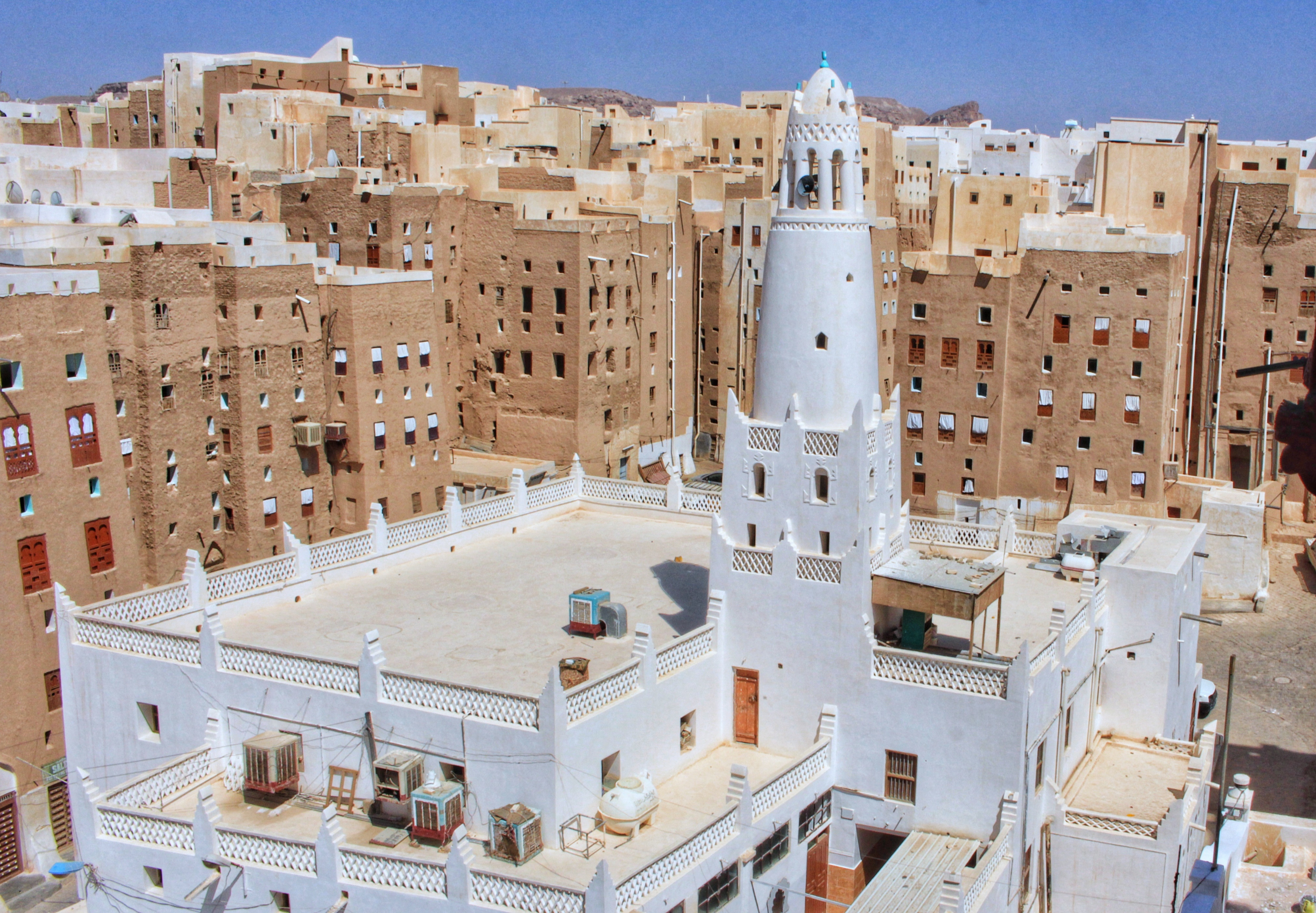
- Aerial view of Shibam Roofs of the towers View of the city and its walls City gate Great Mosque of Shibam
- Nicknames: Manhattan of the Desert (مَانْهَاتَن ٱلصَّحْرَاء); Chicago of the Desert (شِيْكَاغو ٱلصَّحْرَاء)
- Map of the city

- Location in Yemen Shibam (Middle East)
- Coordinates: 15°55′37″N 48°37′36″E
- Country: Yemen
- Governorate: Hadhramaut
- District: Shibam

Population
  - Total: 7,000
- Time zone: GMT+3

UNESCO World Heritage Site
- Official name: Old Walled City of Shibam
- Type: Cultural
- Criteria: iii, iv, vi
- Designated: 1982; endangered as of 2015
- Reference no.: 192
- Region: Arab States

Shibam (Arabic: شِبَام, romanized: Shibām), officially the Old Walled City of Shibam (Arabic: مدينة شبام القديمة وسورها), is a town in Wadi Hadhramaut in eastern Yemen with about 7,000 inhabitants. It is the seat of the Shibam District in the Hadhramaut Governorate. It is known for its mudbrick-made high-rise buildings, with some of the buildings reaching as high as eleven stories. The design centred around protecting the residents of the city from Bedouin attacks.

The city was founded around the 3rd century and became the capital of the Kingdom of Hadhramaut in 300 AD. Its strategic location along ancient trade routes contributed to its prosperity. Shibam has been continuously inhabited for an estimated 1,700 years. In 1982, Shibam was designated a UNESCO World Heritage Site due to its unique architecture and cultural significance. It is sometimes informally referred to as the "Manhattan of the Desert" (مَانْهَاتَن ٱلصَّحْرَاء) or "Chicago of the Desert" (شِيْكَاغو ٱلصَّحْرَاء).

== History ==
The first known inscription about the city dates from the 3rd century CE. According to al-Hamdani, the origins of the city of Shibam date back to the pre-Islamic period, when the town rose to prominence until it became the capital of the Kingdom of Hadhramaut in 300 AD, after the destruction of its previous capital, Shabwa, located in the far west of the Hadhramaut Valley. It is not clear whether the current city is standing where the ancient city stood, a theory suggests that the city's rise of more than 6 meters from the surrounding floor plain might be because of the accumilation of ruins over a long period of time, although there hasn't been any archaeological excavations that back this theory up and it might be a natural outcrop of the mountain spur behind it.

There are two major archaeological sites near Shibam: Jujah and Gabusa. Jujah used to be a quarry for large squared building stones. Gabusa was the site of an Assyrian-style bronze lion's head.

In the 20th century, it was one of the three major cities of the Qu'aiti Sultanate, the others being Mukalla and Ash-Shihr.

The city was added to the UNESCO World Heritage List in 1982.

The 2008 Yemen cyclone flooded Shibam causing some of the buildings to collapse.. On 15 March 2009, a suicide bomber killed four South Korean tourists and a Yemeni tour guide in Shibam in a terrorist attack claimed by Al-Qaeda in the Arabian Peninsula.

During the Yemen Civil War, the city suffered some damage after insurgents detonated a car bomb. There was also coalition bombing in the area. In 2015, UNESCO listed the city, along with Old Sanaa, as "cultural heritage at risk".

== Culture ==
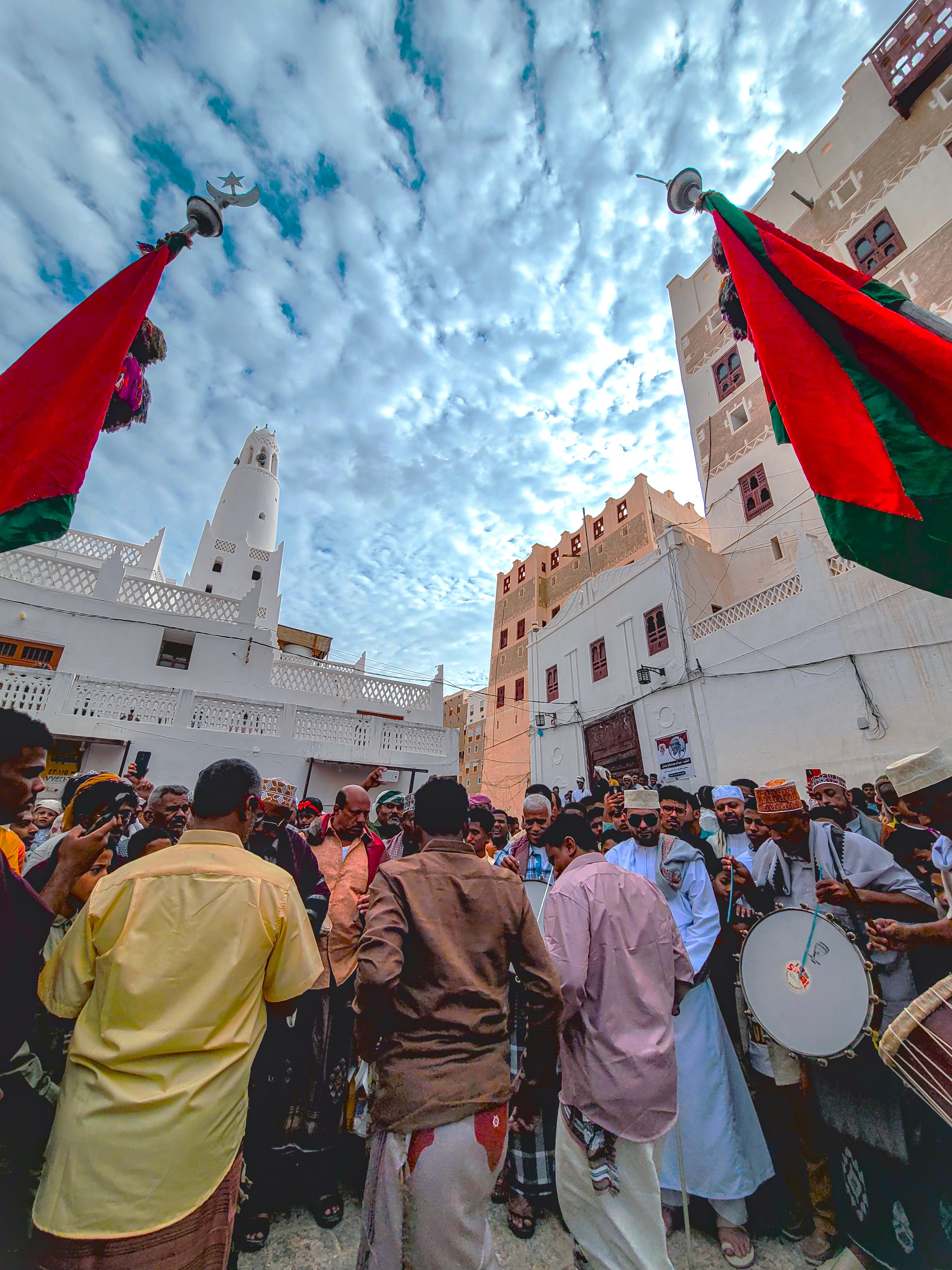
Eid celebrations in Shibam

=== Architecture ===
External videos
- Old Walled City of Shibam (UNESCO/NHK) (via UNESCO)

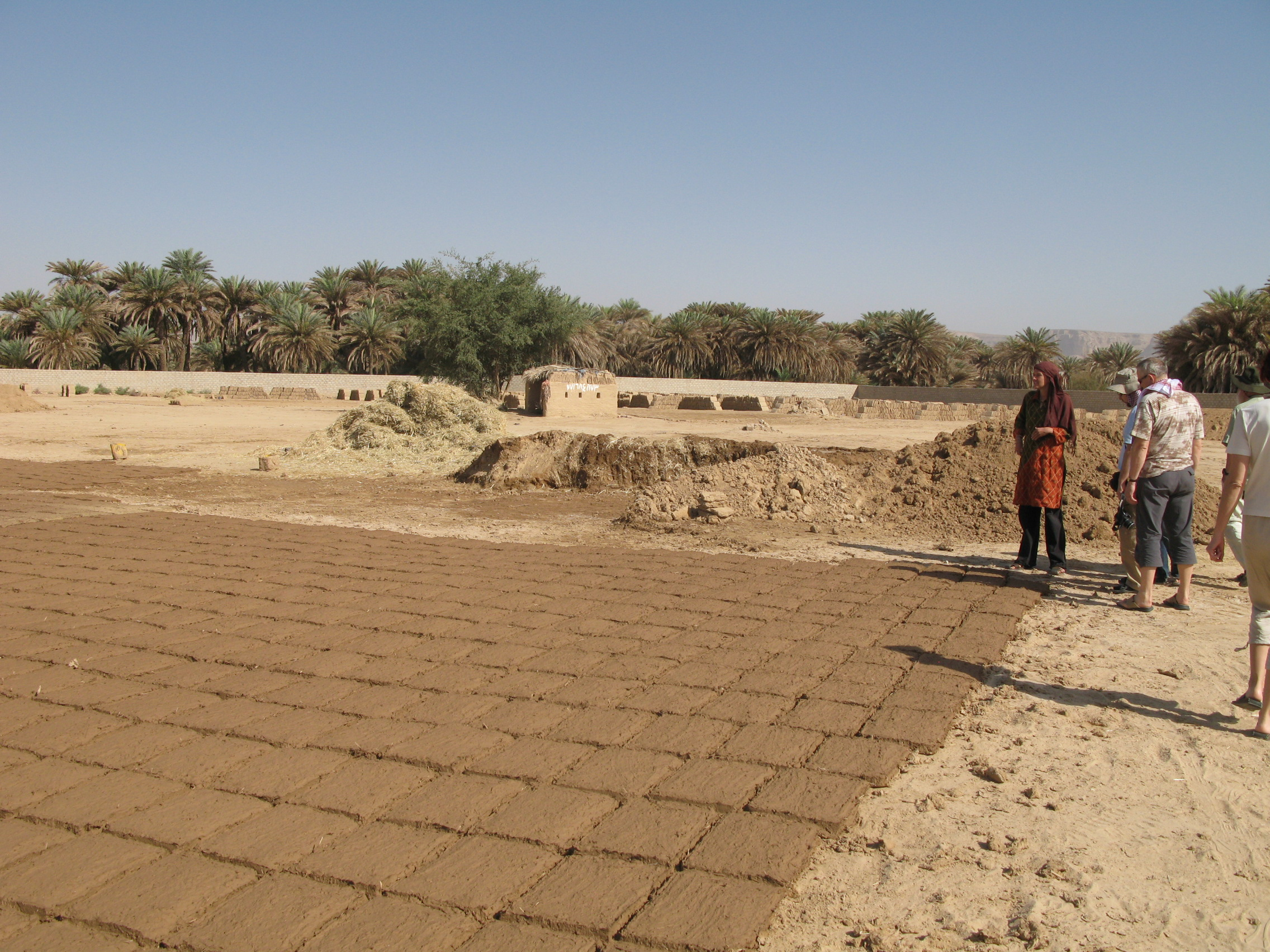
The mud bricks used in building the towers

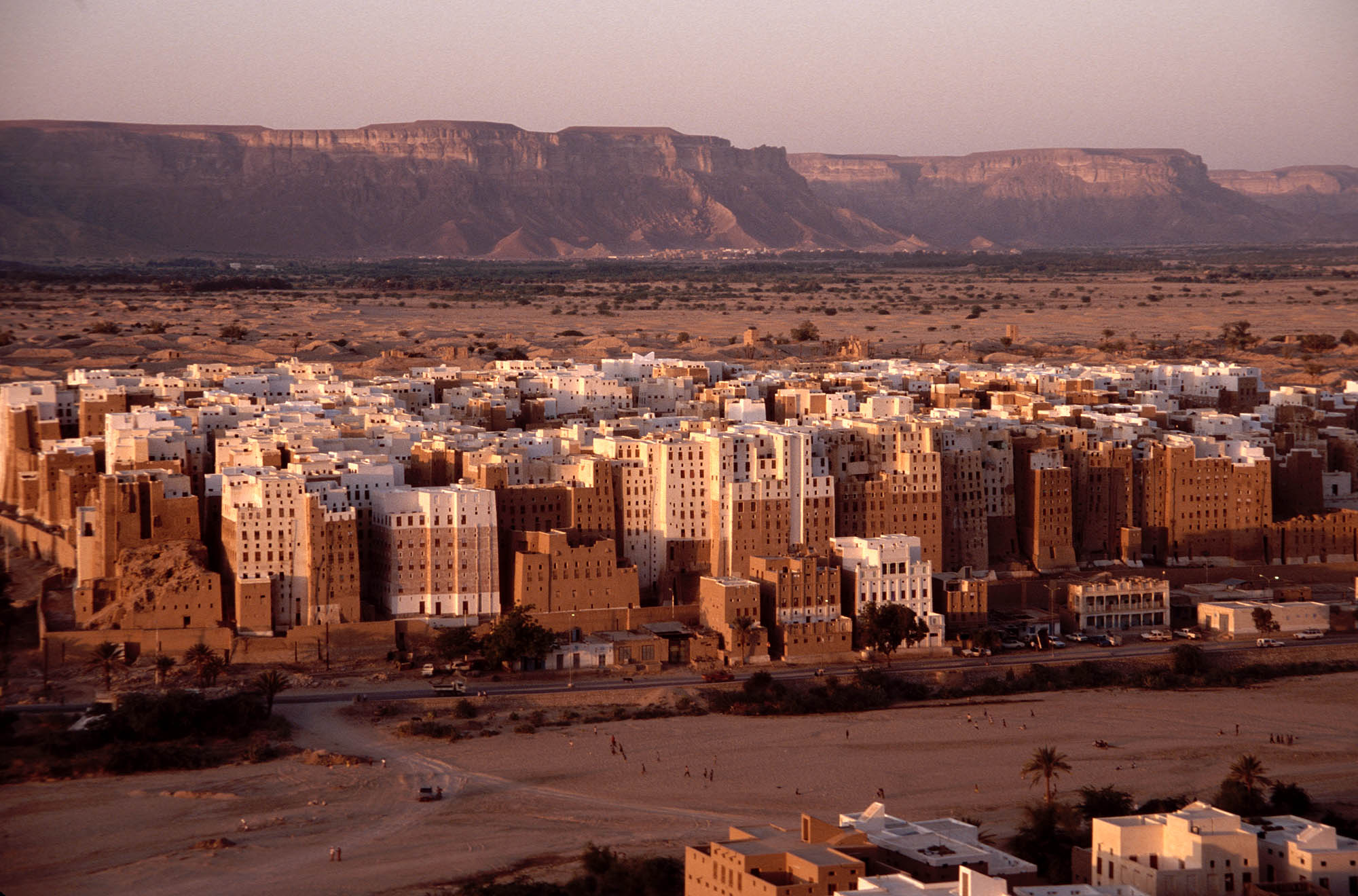
The city with the Hadhramaut Mountains in the background

Shibam, a UNESCO World Heritage Site, is known for its distinct architecture. The houses of Shibam are all made out of mudbrick, and about 500 of them are tower blocks, which rise 5 to 11 stories high, with each floor having one or two rooms. This architectural style was used in order to protect residents from Bedouin attacks. While Shibam has been in existence for an estimated 1,700 years, the present town dates to 1533. Many houses, though, have been rebuilt numerous times in the last few centuries.

Shibam is often called "the oldest skyscraper city in the world". It is one of the oldest and best examples of urban planning based on the principle of vertical construction. The city has some of the tallest mud buildings in the world, with some of them over 30 m (98 feet) high, thus being early high-rise apartment buildings. In order to protect the buildings from rain and erosion, the walls must be routinely maintained by applying fresh layers of mud. The city is surrounded by a fortified wall, giving it the name "the walled city of Shibam".

==== Threats ====
The mudbrick buildings are frequently threatened by wind, rain, and heat erosion, and require constant upkeep in order to maintain their structures. The city was heavily affected by flooding from a tropical storm in 2008. The foundations of many of the buildings in the city were compromised by the flood waters, eventually leading to their collapse. It was also the target of an Al Qaeda attack in 2009.

In 2015, Shibam was added to the list of World Heritage Sites in danger when violent civil war erupted in Yemen. Historic buildings were significantly damaged during heavy bombing in Sanaa, and remain at risk from armed conflict.

In 2026, a historic mud-brick house in Shibam's Mosque Square collapsed. It reportedly did not lead to any casualties or damage to adjacent property.

== Geography ==
The town is located in the central-western area of Hadhramaut Governorate, in the desert of Ramlat al-Sab'atayn. Its main road links Sanaa and other cities of western Yemen to the far eastern territories. The nearest towns are Seiyun, seat of an airport, and Tarim, both in the east. Another road, departing from the village of Alajlanya, in the west, links Shibam to Mukalla, the governorate's capital on the Indian Ocean.

== Climate ==
Shibam has a hot desert climate (Köppen: BWh). At an average temperature of 28.0 degrees Celsius (82.4 degrees Fahrenheit), June is the hottest month of the year. January is the coldest month, with temperatures averaging 18.6 °C (65.5 °F).

Climate data for Shibam
Month	Jan	Feb	Mar	Apr	May	Jun	Jul	Aug	Sep	Oct	Nov	Dec	Year
Mean daily maximum °C (°F)	24.0 (75.2)	25.3 (77.5)	27.4 (81.3)	29.5 (85.1)	31.8 (89.2)	33.4 (92.1)	32.5 (90.5)	31.8 (89.2)	30.8 (87.4)	29.0 (84.2)	26.7 (80.1)	25.3 (77.5)	29.0 (84.1)
Daily mean °C (°F)	18.6 (65.5)	19.9 (67.8)	22.1 (71.8)	24.3 (75.7)	26.7 (80.1)	28.0 (82.4)	27.5 (81.5)	26.9 (80.4)	26.0 (78.8)	23.3 (73.9)	20.8 (69.4)	19.8 (67.6)	23.7 (74.6)
Mean daily minimum °C (°F)	13.3 (55.9)	14.6 (58.3)	16.9 (62.4)	19.2 (66.6)	21.7 (71.1)	22.7 (72.9)	22.6 (72.7)	22.1 (71.8)	21.3 (70.3)	17.6 (63.7)	14.9 (58.8)	14.3 (57.7)	18.4 (65.2)
Average precipitation mm (inches)	8 (0.3)	5 (0.2)	17 (0.7)	10 (0.4)	3 (0.1)	0 (0)	3 (0.1)	4 (0.2)	1 (0.0)	0 (0)	5 (0.2)	8 (0.3)	64 (2.5)
Source: Climate-Data.org

== Influence ==
The Dubai Global Village, an open-air shopping and entertainment complex in the United Arab Emirates, includes a Yemeni pavilion with mud-brick structures intended to evoke the architecture of Shibam.

== Gallery ==
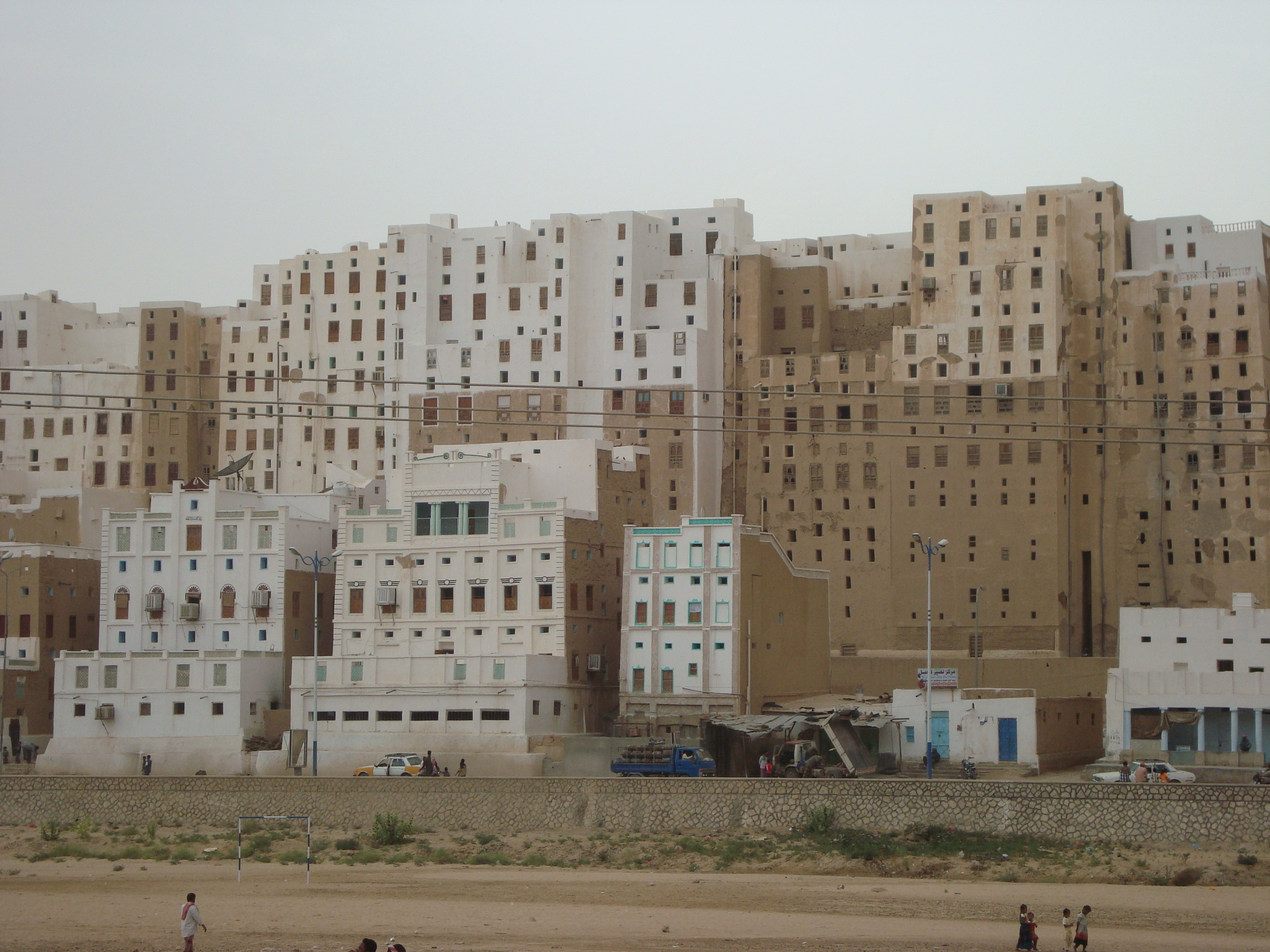
View of several buildings

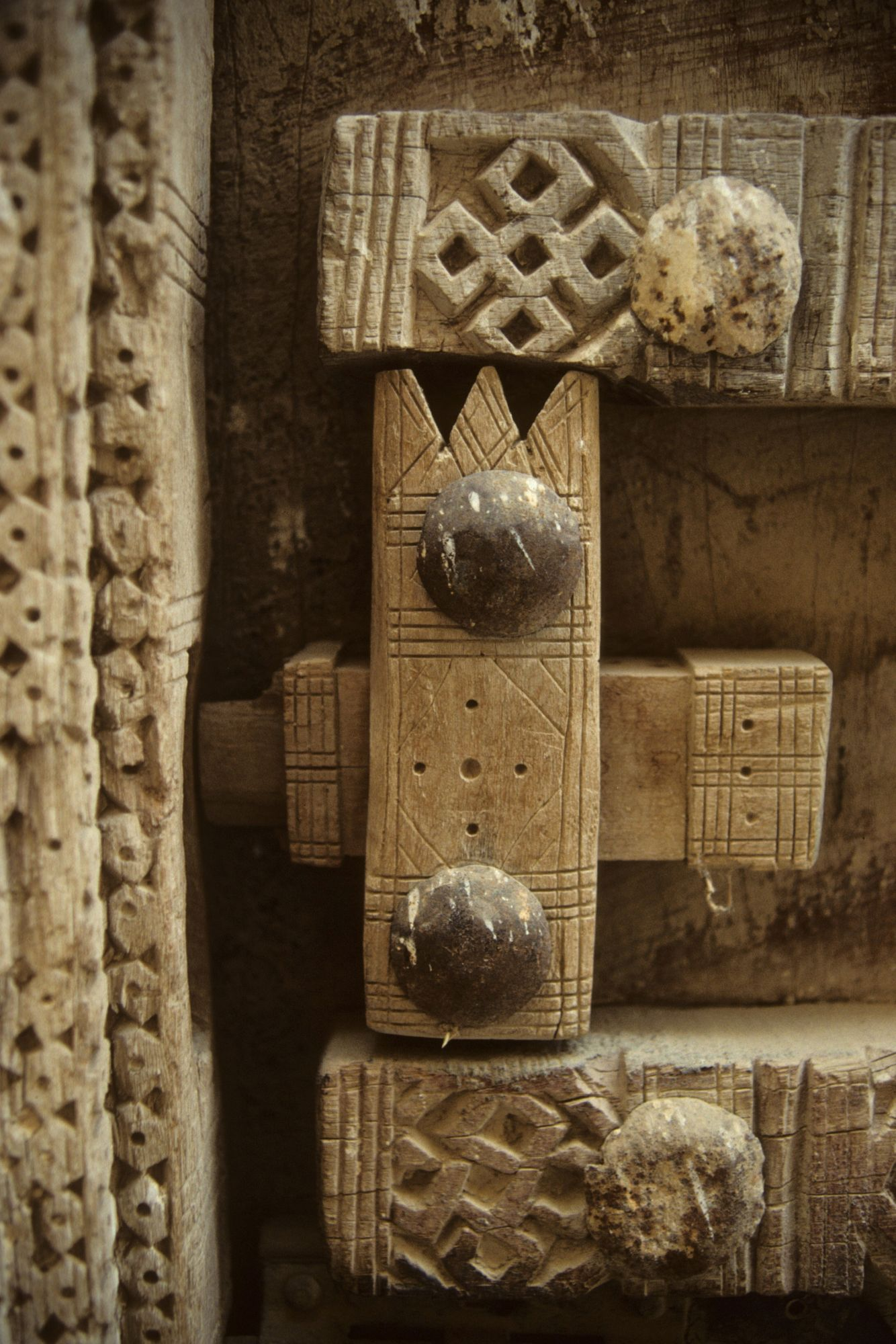
Detail of intricate wooden door

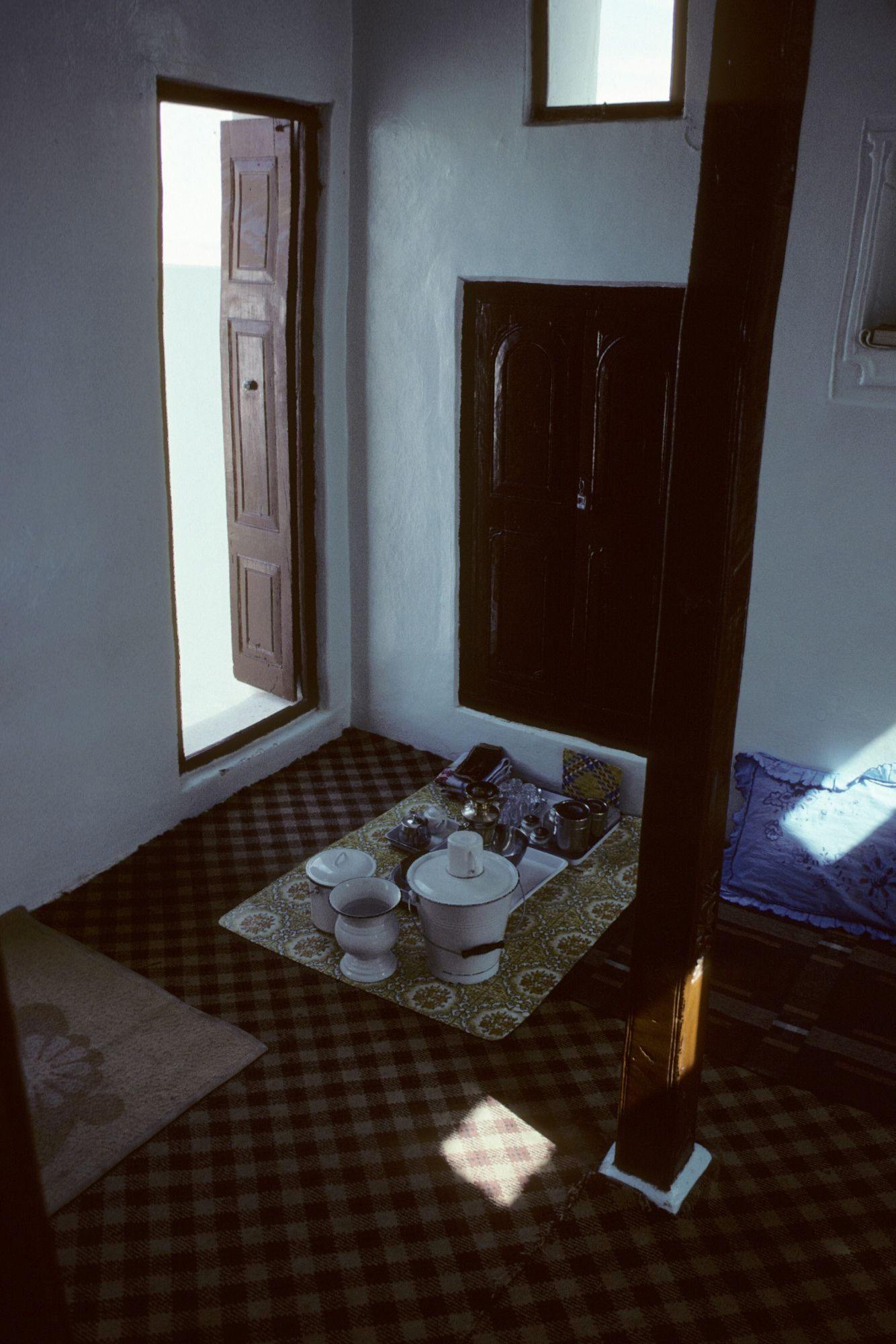
Interior of one of the buildings

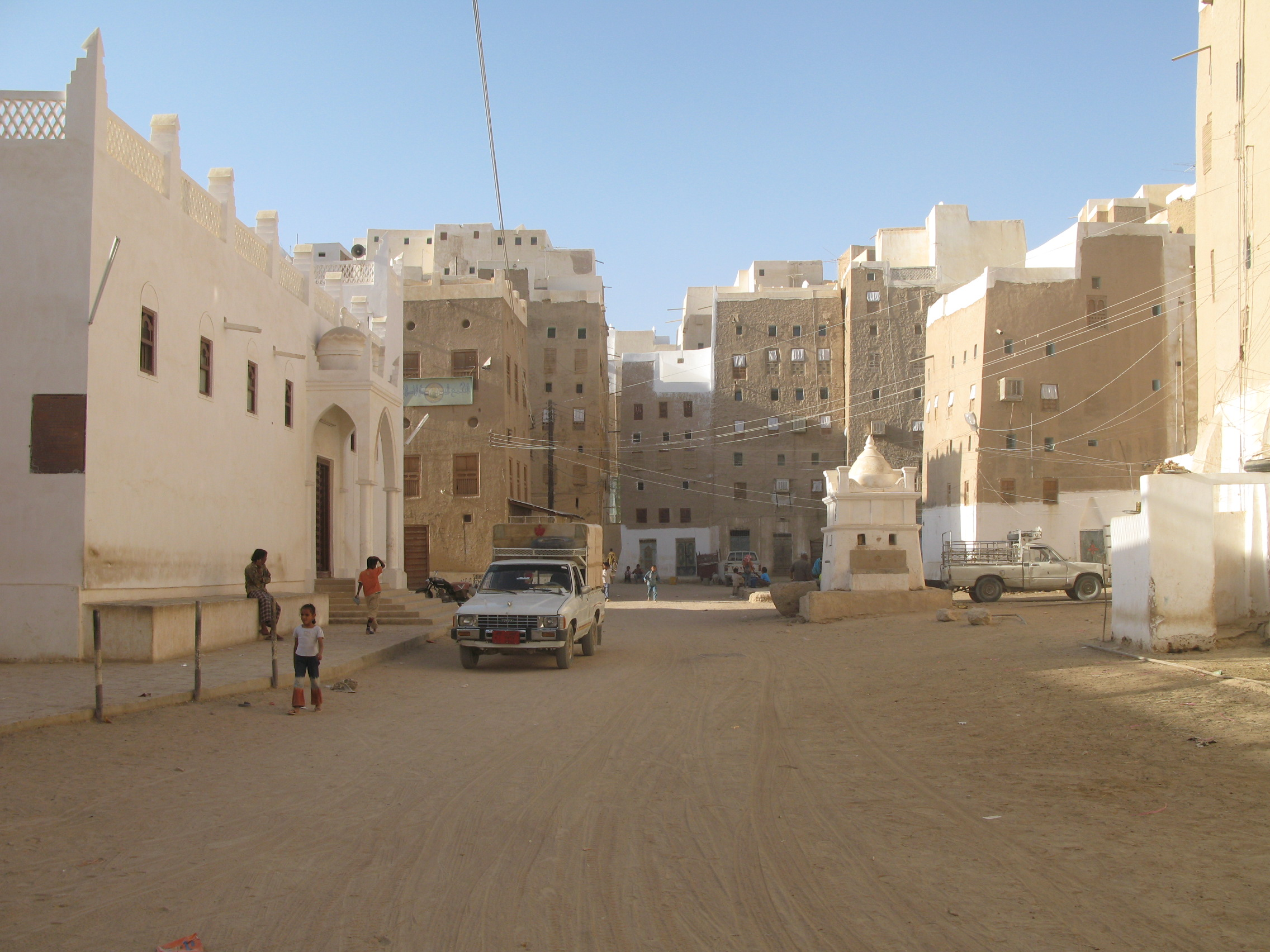
Street view

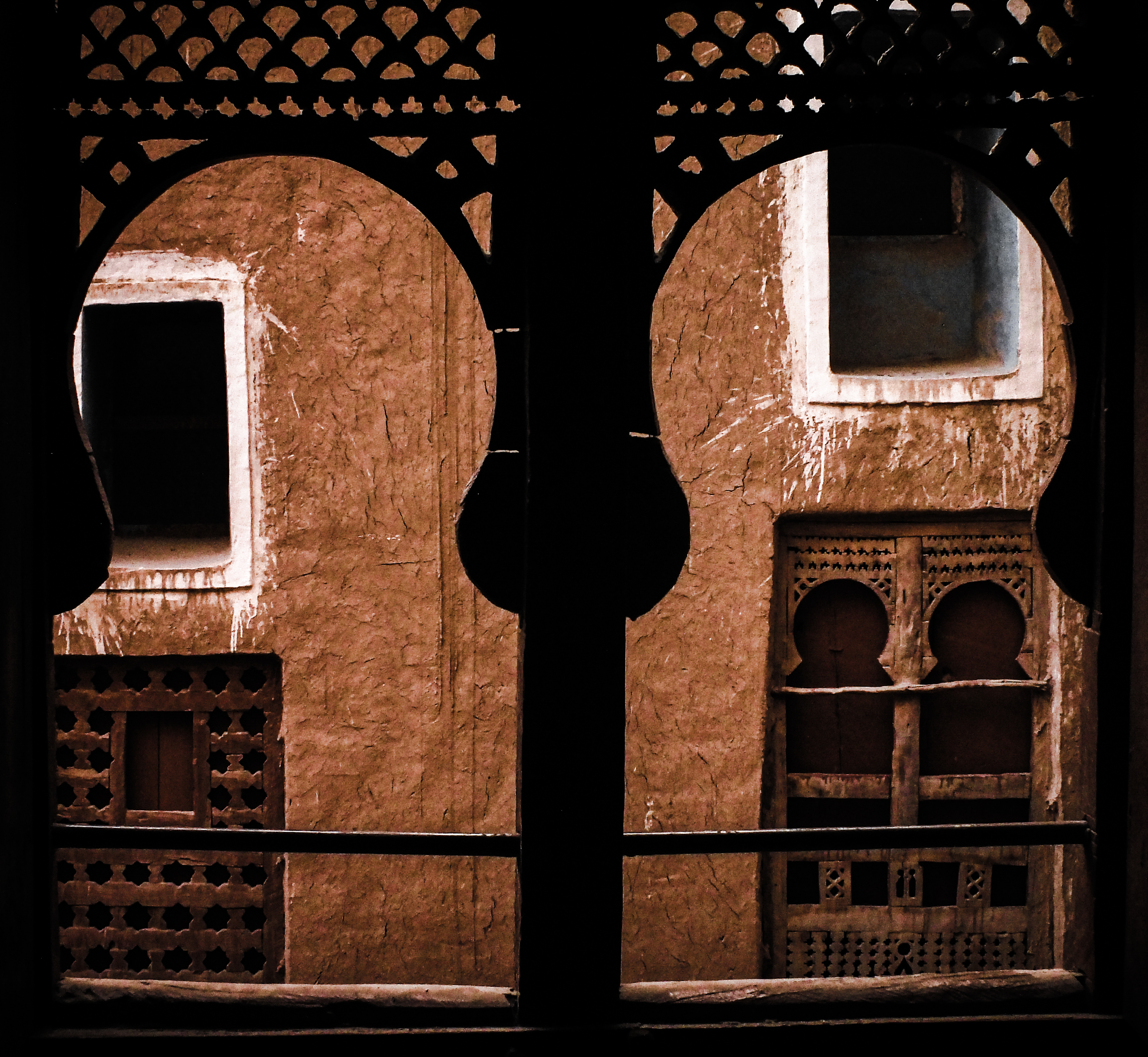
Wooden windows of the city

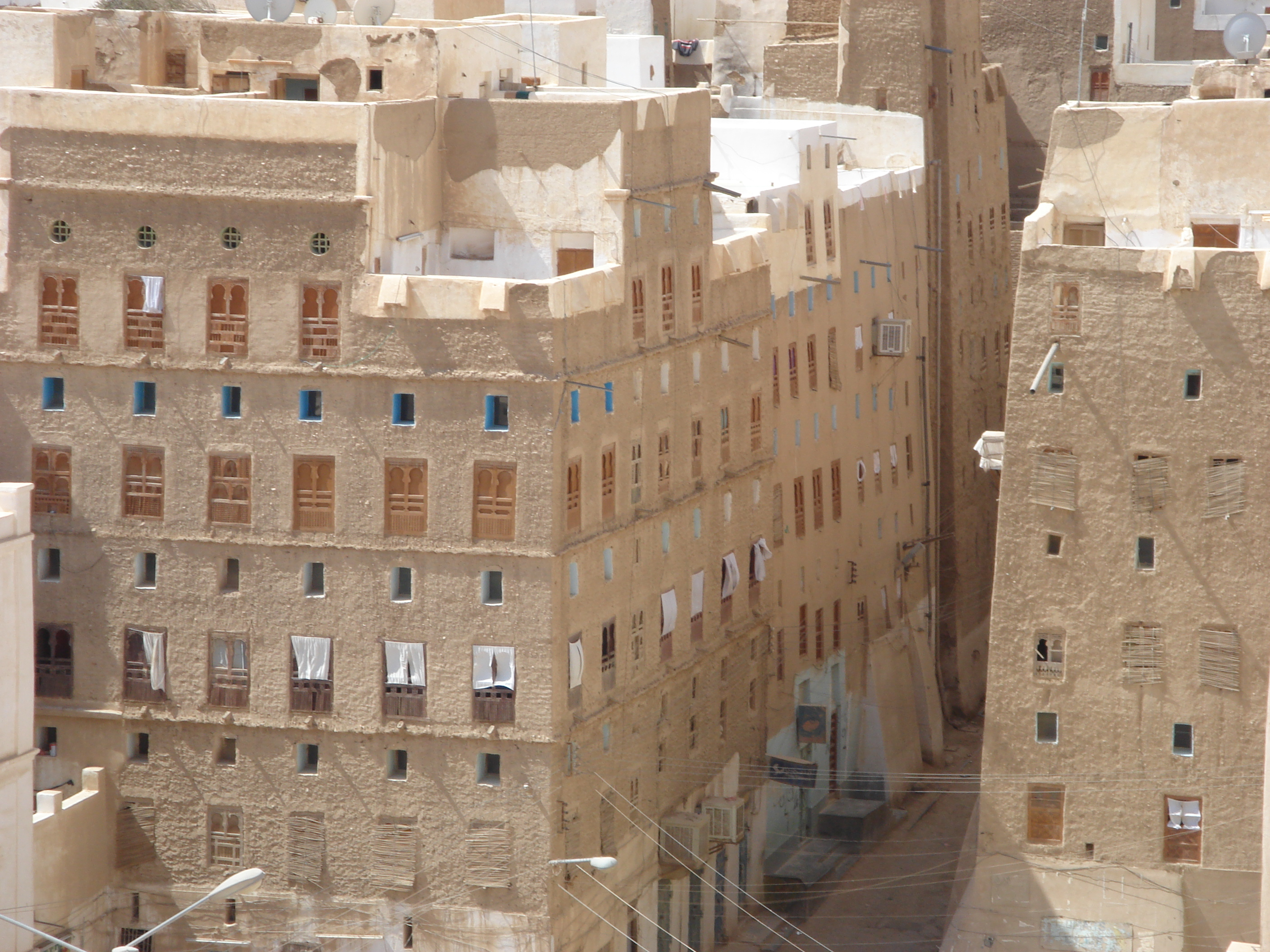
Shibam buildings with balconies

Video of several scenes of Shibam

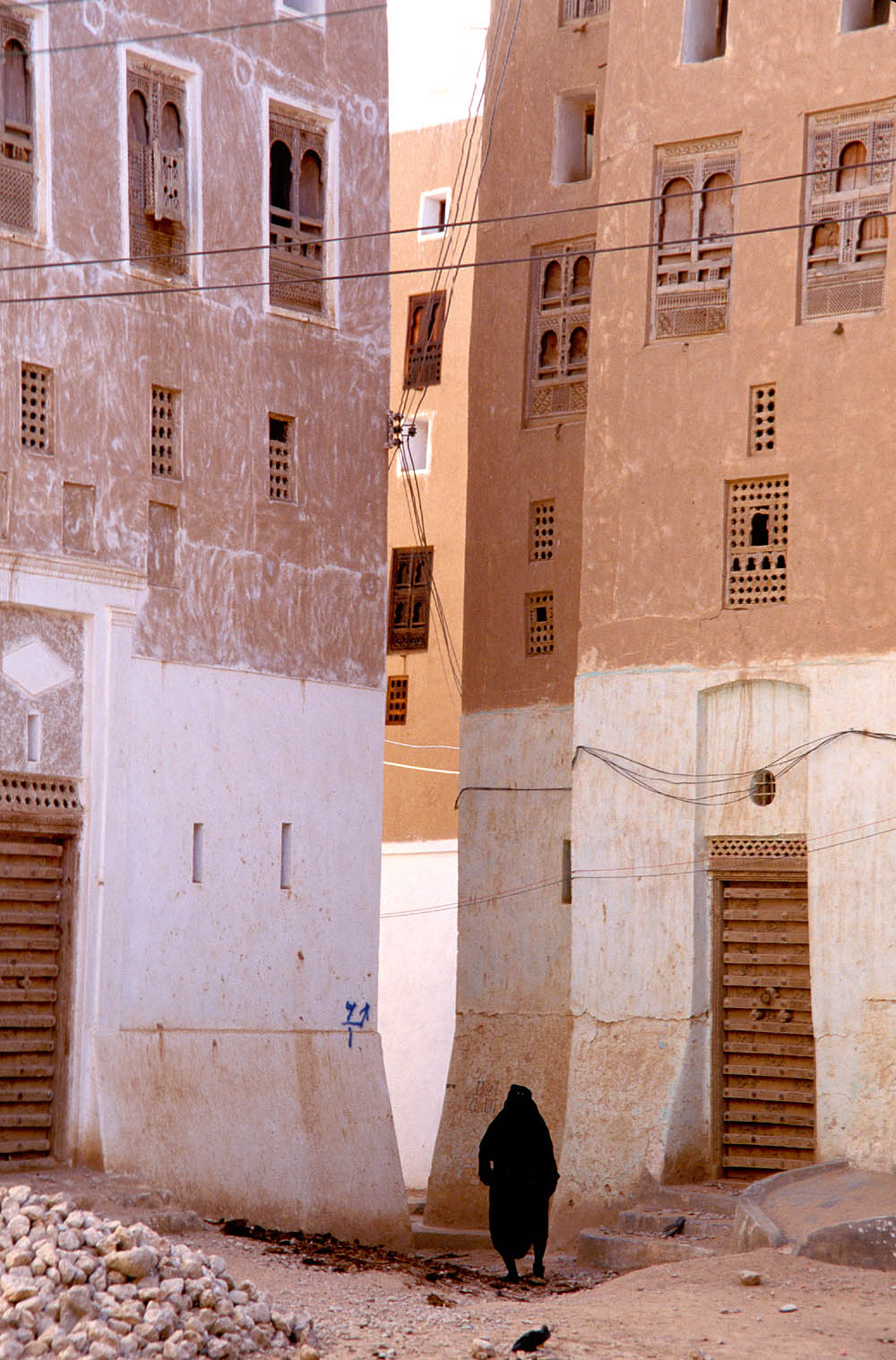
Buildings on a street inside the city

== See also ==
- Mukalla
- Marib
- Seiyun
- Tarim

== Sources ==
- Lewcock, Ronald B. (1986). Wādī Ḥaḍramawt and the Walled City of Shibām. Unesco. ISBN 978-92-3-102338-5.
