= Babak Khorramdin Revolt =

Zoroastrian uprising against the Abbasids

- Part of the Persian rebellions against the Caliphate
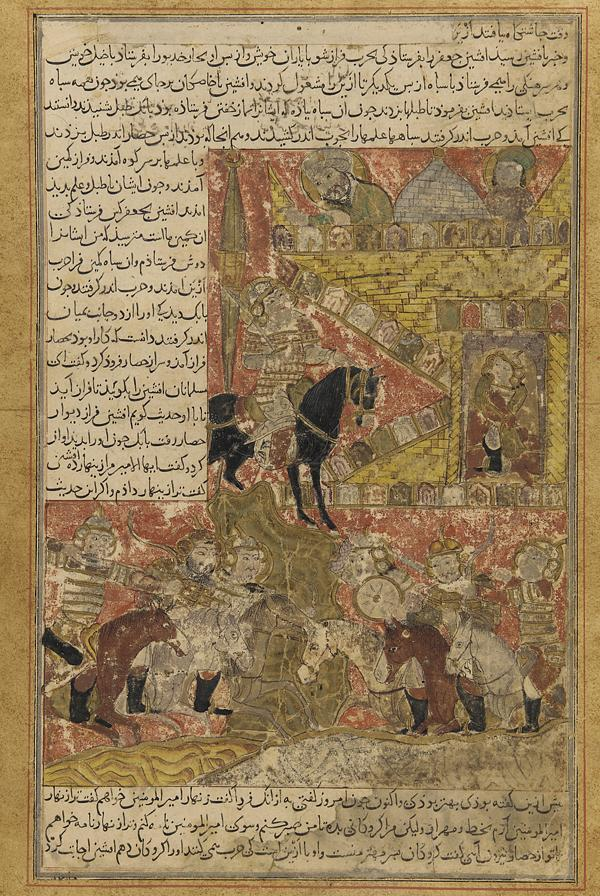
- Babak Khorramdin in negotiations with Al-Afshin
Date	816–837
Location	Northwestern Iran, Iranian Azerbaijan
Result	Abbasid victory (Note: "Although al-Mu'tasim's general Afshin had finally succeeded in annihilating Babak in 837, this victory was won at the price of such sacrifices that the Caliphate was in no position to undertake any other contests." "Babak’s resistance ended in 838 when he was defeated by an Iranian general."): Suppression of the uprisings; Destruction of Babak Fort; Capture and execution of Babak Khorramdin
Territorial changes	Abbasids reassert control over Azerbaijan and other surroundings after suppressing the revolt

Belligerents
Abbasid Caliphate	Khurramite Rebels; Qarinvand dynasty Supported by: Byzantine Empire

Commanders and leaders
Al-Ma'mun; Al-Mu'tasim; Al-Afshin; Ishaq ibn Ibrahim; Bugha al-Kabir (Note: al-Tabri has mentioned Bugha's participation in the Abbasid campaigns against Babak in 835-836.); Muhammad bin Humayd al-Tusi †; Abu Sa'id Muhammad ibn Yusuf; Abu Dulaf al-Ijli; Muhammad ibn al-Ba'ith (after 835)	Babak Khorramdin (executed); Ishmah al-Kurdi (executed); Ali ibn Mazdak; Muhammad ibn al-Ba'ith; Mu'awiya; Mazyar (executed)

Strength
Unknown	100,000–200,000 rebels (probably overstated) (Note: "The size of his army has been variously described as between 100,000 and 200,000 fighters, which is probably an exaggeration, but it does show that he had much support for his cause.")

Casualties and losses
High casualties (Exaggeration) (Note: Crone writes, "As one Armenian put it, he killed 30,000, more than 100,000, or 255,000—counting Muslims only—a million, or 500,000 according to low estimates, uncountable numbers according to high ones. Clearly nobody knew. She concludes it was not the number, but Babak's readiness to kill anyone that earned him his bloodthirsty reputation. Various figures, said to have been obtained from an executioner or executioners whom Bābak had employed, are given for those whose death he ordered in the course of his long revolt; the figure of 255,000 or more in most of the sources. is obviously an exaggeration, no doubt intended to impute cruelty and bloodthirstiness to Bābak.)	Up to 100,000–230,000 rebels killed (Note: Ishaq ibn Ibrahim dealt a decisive blow to the Khurramites and ruthlessly suppressed the rebellion, killing 60,000 to 100,000 Khurramites. Richard Foltz claims that after Babak's uprising was suppressed, 100,000 of his followers were killed. during the Khurramite uprising of Azerbaijan, reportedly 30,000 men were killed, and so many women and children enslaved.)

The Revolt of Babak Khorramdin (Persian: شورش بابک خرمدين, romanized: Shuresh Bābak Khorramdin ; Arabic: ثَوْرَةُ بَابَكْ الخُرَّمِيِّ, romanized: Thawrat Bābak al-Khurramī) was a series of uprisings by Babak Khorramdin, who led the Khurramite movement from 816 to 837, after Javidhan. It was one of the largest Persian uprisings against the Abbasid Caliphate and occurred during the reigns of Al-Ma'mun and Al-Mu'tasim, lasting for 20 years. The uprising was eventually suppressed and the Abbasids captured and executed Babak.

== Background ==
The Khurramites under Babak's leadership, proclaimed the division and the redistribution of the great estates and the end to the despotic foreign rule. Taking advantage of the turmoil created by the Abbasid Civil War, they began making attacks on Muslim forces in 816 in Iran and Iraq. Babak's rise to the leadership of the Khurramites began when Javidhan ibn Sahl enlisted the help of a young man of illegitimate birth named Babak, appointing him to manage his local estate. The leader of the other Khurramite movement was a certain Abu Imran, who often clashed with Javidhans forces. During one of the clashes, Abu Imran was defeated and killed, whilst Javidhan was mortally wounded, dying three days later. Javidhan was succeeded by Babak, who had already converted to Khurramism under the latters service. when Babak's master died, he seized control of the Khurramite movement, claiming that Javidhan's spirit had passed to him. It was in 201/816-17 that Babak became the new leader of the Khurramites. The Khurramites opposed Muslims, particularly Arabs. Babak's revolt was based in Badhdh, a city located in the mountainous region south of Araxes river, situated between Ardabil and Ahar. The Khurramites seized control of Azerbaijan and other regions, seeking to restore the faith to Mazdakism. From his mountain fortress capital al-Badhdh (located south of the Aras river in modern Qarāja-dāḡ), Babak sent his forces westward to Armenia, eastward to Khorasan. Northern Azerbaijan was the epicenter of this prolonged rebellion. The Abbasids during the reign of al-Ma'mun and al-Mu'tasim launched a series of campaigns against Babak's rebellion across the mountainous areas of Azerbaijan. These highland areas had remained largely independent from Muslim control until the Abbasid army made a plan to reassert control over the mountain inhabitants.

=== Khurramite uprisings during the Reign of Harun al-Rashid ===
In 807, Caliph Harun al-Rashid Dispatched Abdallah ibn Malik al-Khuza'i to fight against the Khurramites in Azerbaijan, Abdallah captured and enslaved many of them, Harun ordered the execution of the prisoners and the sale of the Khurramite captives.

In the same year, Harun al-Rashid died while traveling to Khorasan. During this time, the Khurramites took advantage of Harun's death as an opportunity and rebelled in many villages around Isfahan and mountainous regions including Rayy, Hamadan, Karaj, and Dastaba. A major uprising occurred in Azerbaijan, where many women and children were enslaved and reportedly 30,000 men were killed. The Abbasids successfully Suppressed the rebellions.

== Abbasid campaigns ==
=== al-Ma'mun's campaigns ===
The khurramites Rebelled against the Caliphate for the third time in (212AH/827CE) at Isfahan, In response, the Abbasid caliph al-Ma'mun dispatched several commanders to defeat Babak. He sent Khorasani Iranian commanders such as Yahya ibn Mu'adh al-Razi, A veteran who fought against Babak unsuccessfully in 201/816-17. In the next year al-Ma'mun then sent another commander, Mohammed bin Abi Khalid, a Khorasani Iranian who was also defeated by Babak. Later al-Ma'mun dispatched a Khorasani Arab commander called Muhammad bin Humayd al-Tusi to Azerbaijan. Muhammad's first mission was to Defeat one of Babak's allies named Zurayq. After eliminating Zurayq, Muhammad ibn Humayd turned his attention to Babak. In 212/827, he arrived in Azerbaijan and deceptively summoned 26 regional leaders under the pretense of seeking military advice, then had them arrested and imprisoned in Dinawar on the caliph's orders. The following year, Muhammad launched a systematic campaign against Babak, establishing supply lines and fortified positions while advancing northward from Maragha. His forces included local Arabs, volunteers from Azerbaijan and Mosul, and irregular troops. However, in 213/828, Babak's forces confronted Muhammad's army in a mountain engagement, they managed to defeat Muhammad's army and have him killed in the battle. This engagement ended al-Ma'mun's attempts to suppress Babak's rebellion.

=== al-Mu'tasim’s first campaign and The Great Revolt ===
After al-Ma'mun's death, the new Abbasid caliph al-Mu'tasim began campaigning against the Khurramited as his first major campaign of the new reign was directed against the Khurramites in Adharbayjan and Arran. As Babak's influence was expanding until the reign of al-Mu'tasim, during which the Khurramites gained strength and reached the al-Jibal region. it was recorded as the fourth rebellion of the Khurramites in (833CE/218AH), and is considered one of the major uprisings known as "The Great Revolt ". Many people from Isfahan, Hamadan, Masabadhan, Mihrajanqadhaq, including the two Māhs (Nihawand, Dinawar) and some people of Fars among other regions joined the movement, they adopted the Khurramite beliefs and were operating under Babak's direction. They caused various actions including killing Tax collectors, Robbing Travellers, and slaughtering Muslims. The Khurramite rebels in Fars were defeated by the Caliphal forces. Later, the Khurramites launched a campaign in the lead of Ali ibn Mazdak in which they successfully captured Karaj, the centre of the local ruler of Abu Dulaf al-Ijli in Isfahan, It was said that Abu dulaf was away with his troops during the Engagement and it's likely that he didn't know about the Khurramite attack. According to Tarikhnama babak sent supplies to al-Jibal, And according to al-Ya'qubi The Khurramites managed to defeat the first army in the lead of Hashim bin Batijur, which was the first army sent by al-Mu'tasim. Then later al-Mu'tasim dispatched the Governor of baghdad Ishaq ibn Ibrahim al-Mus'abi, Ishaq led a ruthless campaign and dealt a decisive blow to the Khurramites, resulting in a suppression of the Khurramite rebellion, killing 60,000 to 100,000 Khurramites. the engagement between Ishaq and the Khurramites took place near the district of Hamadan. After sending a victory dispatch in December 833, he returned to Iraq in May 834, bringing with him a large number of captives and individuals who had received guarantees of safe conduct. The remaining of the Rebels that survived the ruthless campaign escaped to the Byzantine territories. The survivors converted to Christianity, later they joined the imperial Byzantine army. the person who led those survivors to the Byzantine lands was named "Nusayr" who was later known as Theophobos.

=== al-Mu'tasim’s second campaign and downfall of Babak ===
Caliph al-Mu'tasim dispatched Abu Sa'id Muhammad ibn yusuf to rebuild the forts demolished by Babak between Zanjan and Ardabil. The Khurramites, led by a certain Mu'awiya, made a failed attack on the Arabs. Meanwhile, Muhammad ibn al-Ba'ith, the ruler of Shahi fortress and the citadel of Tabriz in Azerbaijan, was initially allied with Babak, providing a full support and supplies for Babak's troops. However, when an Abbasid army approached in 220/835, he defected to the Abbasids and pledged allegiance to Caliph al-Mu'tasim, using the opportunity to consolidate his control over Marand. As part of this, he trapped the Khurramite leader, Isma al-Kurdi, he got all his men and companions drunk, Killed them, and captured Isma. He transferred Isma to a fortress near Lake Urmia, later sending him to the caliph, who questioned him to learn about the pathways and military positions in Azerbaijan.

In 220/835, Caliph al-Mu‘tasim assigned his general, al-Afshin, to lead the campaign against Babak Khorramdin. As part of a broader strategy, Muhammad ibn Yusuf al-Thaghri was dispatched to Ardabil to rebuild the fortresses between Ardabil and Zanjan and to establish garrisons and secure the supply routes. al-Afshin began his campaign by clearing the Jibal region of rebellious local lords and fortified the road from Ardabil to Barzand with garrisons and defensive trenches to protect supply caravans. Operating from his base in Barzand, he engaged in gathering and advanced with extreme caution–moving his camp only four miles a day and protecting it with trenches and scattered iron spikes to avoid ambushes. By March 221/836, he had reached a position just six miles from Badhdh, Babak's fort. Though he scored several victories over Babak, he also suffered several setbacks. In 222/837, after prolonged preparation and steady progress, he stormed al-Badhdh. delivering a decisive blow to the Khurramites.

=== Capture of Babak ===
After the destruction of Babak's stronghold in 837, he retreated westward with a few of his companions and looked for sanctuary with the Armenian noble Sahl Smbatean. Babak requested that his brother be sheltered apart by another Armenian noble, trying to ensure safety. However, the plan was unsuccessful. Though Babak formed a temporary alliance with Armenian nobles, these relationships were often fragile and self-interested. Eventually, Sahl handed Babak and his brother over to the Abbasids. By surrendering him to the caliphal forces, Sahl aimed to regain favour at the Abbasid leadership. it was said that Sahl had abused Babak's mother, sister, and wife in Babak's presence, that happened before turning them all over to the caliph.

Babak's tragic end, involving Sahl's betrayal and his brutal execution, reflected the belief that Babak had claimed higher status than he deserved. Sahl allegedly mocked him during the betrayal, saying:

"You are just a herder of cows and sheep. What have you got to do with kingship, political decisions, or armies?"

== Byzantine support ==
When Caliph al-Ma'mun learned that the Byzantine Emperor Michael II had begun seriously assisting Babak Khorramdin with money, weapons, and men, and was allowing Babak's followers to use Byzantine territories as refuge when under pressure from the Abbasid army, he launched a campaign and against the Byzantines to personally investigate the military and political situation in the region. In fact, Caliph al-Ma'mun also exploited the revolt of Thomas the Slav and aided him with Arab volunteers to extend his control over Asia Minor. The Russian historian Vasiliev points out:

We notice a real alliance between Thomas and the Arabs, for the presence of Arab units in Thomas's army was not a random coincidence, nor was their entry into it driven by a desire for peace and booty, but rather it followed a precisely defined hostile plan against the Romans.

Byzantine and some Syriac sources such as the history of Michael the Syrian show that an agreement was made between caliph al-Ma'mun and Thomas the Slav, whereby the former recognized Thomas as emperor over the Romans and agreed to support him until he removed his rival from the throne, while the latter agreed to hand over certain border areas and pay an annual tribute. Thomas was crowned by the Patriarch of Antioch. although Thomas gained considerable material strength through his alliance with the Muslims, the Orthodox supporters who initially backed him as a defender of icons later distanced themselves due to his alliance with the Muslims. Thomas's revolt did not last long and the emperor's supporters defeated and captured him, handing him over to Michael II in 823 CE, who executed him. Thomas's movement had effects on both the Caliphate and Byzantines. For the Byzantines, it devastated the empire's provinces economically. The Abbasid Caliphate was disappointed after Thomas's failure.

The connection between war with the Byzantines and the continued struggle against the Khurramites is very clear, as the Byzantine emperor spared no effort in helping and protecting the Khurramites, with Armenia and Azerbaijan serving as the theater for Babak Khorramdin's activities. The Byzantine Emperor Theophilos agreed to the refuge of large numbers of Khurramites in the Byzantine territory, so the Byzantine state equipped and armed them to attack the Abbasid army.

Byzantine sources indicate secret negotiations between Babak and the Byzantines, which appear to have been aimed at securing assistance when necessary. In (216AH/831-832CE), a large contingent of Babak's followers fought alongside the Byzantines. When a detachment of Babak's adherents was defeated in (218AH/833CE), the survivors fled to the Byzantine territories. During Babak's final years, as his situation became increasingly desperate, he persuaded the Byzantine Emperor to launch attacks on the Abbasid frontiers in order to relieve pressure on his own forces. When his armies were decimated and he was forced to flee, he intended to seek refuge in Byzantine lands. Additionally, a portion of his army took sanctuary in Byzantine territories following his defeat.

== Execution of Babak and Aftermath ==
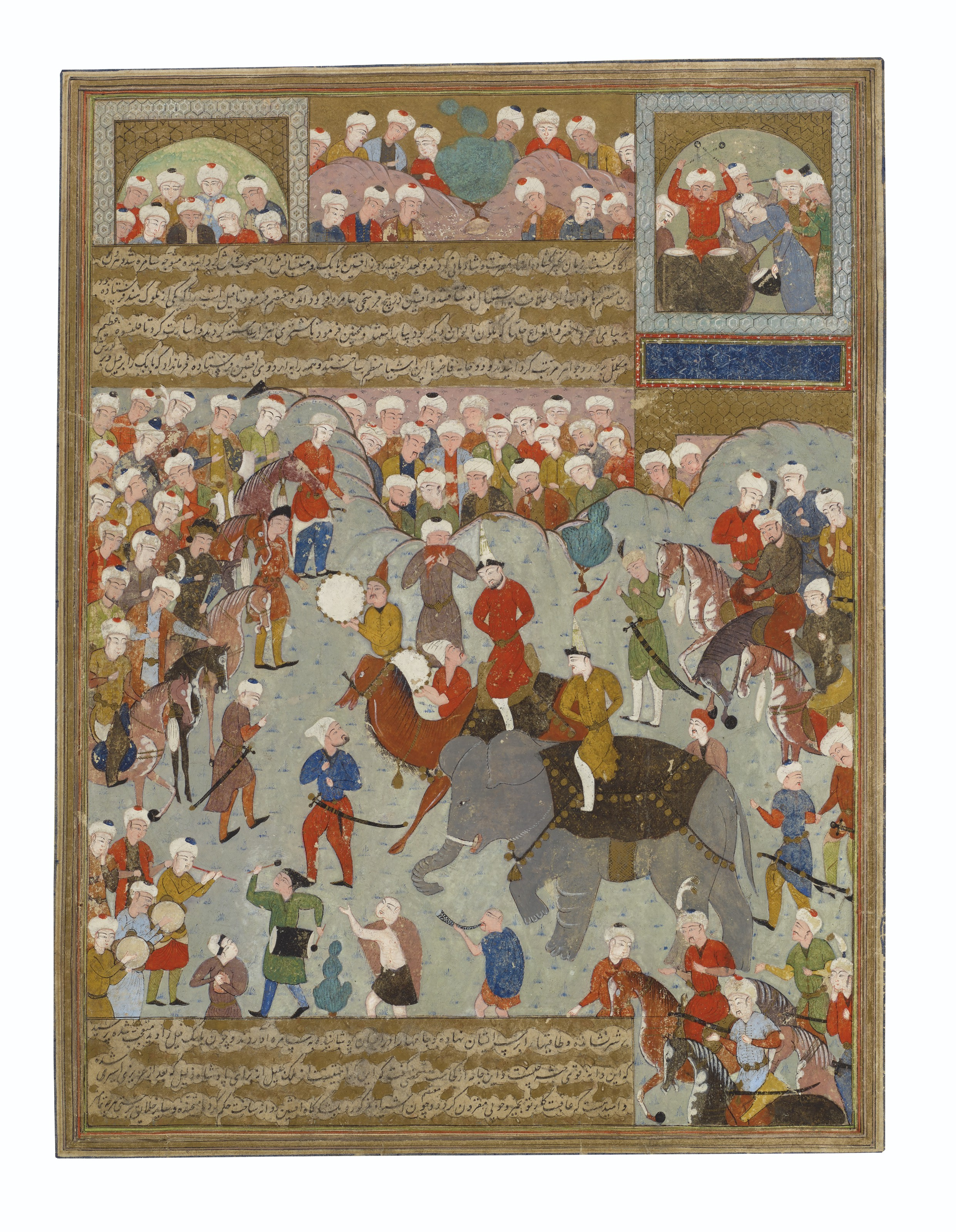
Al-Afshin, upon the camel, parades Babak, upon the elephant, into Samarra. Persian miniature created in 16th-century Safavid Iran, from a copy of Abu Ali Bal'ami's 10th-century Tarikhnama

Babak was eventually seized by Al-Afshin and handed over to the Abbasid Caliph on 3 January 838 in Samarra. Before his execution, he was paraded through Baghdad on an elephant decorated with ornate coverings, wearing ceremonial clothing consisting of a short silk jacket and sable fur hat, with a placard listing his crimes displayed for all to see. He was led between military formations along the main thoroughfare, observed by onlookers, until reaching the palace's public reception chamber where the caliph awaited. In an ironic turn, the caliph ordered that Babak's own former executioner, called Nudnud, should carry out the execution. This man had apparently also been captured. After calls for "Where is Nudnud?" the executioner appeared and performed his gruesome work on his former employer. During the execution, the Caliph's henchmen first cut off Babak's legs and hands to convey a devastating message to his followers, followed by disembowelment. He was then gibbeted alive whilst sewn into a cow's skin with horns at ear level to gradually crush his head as it dried. Babak's severed head was dispatched to Khorasan while his corpse remained on permanent display at what became known as "Babak's Execution Site". Babak's brother Abdullah was executed and displayed in Baghdad the same year under the supervision of Ishaq, who also gibbeted his corpse in Baghdad.

Shortly after, Minkajur al-Ushrusani, whom al-Afshin had appointed as governor of Adharbayjan after the defeat of the Khurramites, rose in revolt, either because he had been involved in financial irregularities, or because he had been a co-conspirator of al-Afshin's. Bugha the Elder marched against him, forcing him to capitulate and receive a safe-passage to Samarra in 840.

Subsequently, al-Mu'tasim launched his second campaign against Mazyar, the autonomous Qarinid ruler of Tabaristan. Mazyar was one of Babak's allies, rebelled in Tabaristan against the caliphate, One of his motives was to spread Zoroastrianism, however the Abbasids suppressed his rebellion and executed him, crucifying him next to Babak in 840CE. Ishaq ibn Ibrahim captured Mazyar. Upon receiving him, Ishaq ordered him to be transported on an elephant and escorted him to the caliph in Samarra. That same year Ishaq formed part of the tribunal that prosecuted the disgraced general al-Afshin, which ended with al-Afshin being found guilty of apostasy and thrown into prison. Later at the same location of "Babak's execution site" the body of al-Afshin (who had been disgraced and executed) was crucified for public display, then burned, with his ashes scattered in the Tigris River.

Another rebel appeared known as Smbat VIII Bagratuni, Smbat just like the other Armenian princes, that were able to use the Caliphate's preoccupation with the Khurramite rebellion of Babak Khorramdin to achieve a significant degree of autonomy during this period. Smbat, who had spent time at the caliphal court as a hostage, was more circumspect about openly challenging Arab power than his brother, but both were ultimately too weak to seriously threaten Abbasid predominance for the time being. When Khalid ibn Yazid al-Shaybani, who in his previous tenures had become enormously unpopular among both the Christian and the Arab princes of the country, was appointed as caliphal governor in 841, Smbat led the reaction against him. The rebels achieved his recall by the Caliph and his replacement with the weaker and more pliant Ali ibn Husayn, to whom the Armenians not only refused to hand over the expected taxes, but whom they promptly blockaded in his capital, Bardaa. When Caliph al-Wathiq (r. 842–847) reappointed Khalid as governor, Smbat was again at the forefront of a revolt against him, alongside the Muslim rebel Sawada ibn Abd al-Hamid al-Jahhafi and Sahak, Prince of Syunik. The rebels were heavily defeated at the Battle of Kawakert, however. Like all prominent nakharar, he was taken captive by Bugha al-Kabir when he invaded Armenia in 853–855.

After the Execution of Babak, Khurramites were left leaderless and they converted to Islam. According to Dionysius, in 227/842, four years after Babak's brutal execution, the Khurramites rebelled at the mountainous region of Beth Qardu, led by a man named Müsa. It was said that Persian forces were dispatched against them, but they were ineffective, rather than engaging in combat, the soldiers were housed in village homes where they lived off local provisions without accomplishing their military objectives. 15,000 soldiers lost their lives during a severe cold. According to some Muslim sources, there was another major uprising, under the leadership of a Kurd named Jafar ibn Mihrijīsh/Faharjish in 227/841. This occurred in the same mountainous region of Mosul (Beth Qardu) and was supposedly part of the same uprising, although Jafar wasn't identified as a Khurramite. The Khurramites organized another uprising in Isfahan during 227-32/841-7, launching raids on Karaj, the uprisings of the Isfahan region continued until 300/912. The Khurramites had a new leader named Bāryazdshah (or the like) who entrenched himself in the mountains near Isfahan, raiding rural settlements and intercepting trade routes. Bāryazdshah was described like Babak as bloodthirsty, killing children and the elderly. He and his followers lasted for 30 years. He was captured and his head was mounted for public display in Isfahan in 321/933, when Ali ibn Buya assaulted some Khurramite Strongholds in Karaj, marking the end of the Khurramite series of uprisings.

== Sources ==
- Bosworth, C. E., ed. (1991). The History of al-Ṭabarī, Volume XXXIII: Storm and Stress Along the Northern Frontiers of the ʿAbbāsid Caliphate: The Caliphate of al-Muʿtasim, A.D. 833–842/A.H. 218–227. SUNY Series in Near Eastern Studies. Albany, New York: State University of New York Press. ISBN 978-0-7914-0493-5.
- Bosworth, Clifford E. (1993). "al-Muʿtaṣim Bi'llāh". In Bosworth, C. E.; van Donzel, E.; Heinrichs, W. P. & Pellat, Ch. (eds.). The Encyclopaedia of Islam, Second Edition. Volume VII: Mif–Naz. Leiden: E. J. Brill. ISBN 978-90-04-09419-2.
- Bosworth, Clifford E. (2016) [1987]. "Azerbaijan iv. Islamic History to 1941". In Yarshater, Ehsan (ed.). Encyclopædia Iranica (Online ed.). Encyclopædia Iranica Foundation.
- Bosworth, Clifford E. (2018) [1984]. "=Afšīn". In Yarshater, Ehsan (ed.). Encyclopædia Iranica (Online ed.). Encyclopædia Iranica Foundation.
- Crone, Patricia (1980). Slaves on Horses: The Evolution of the Islamic Polity. Cambridge University Press. ISBN 0-521-52940-9.
- Crone, Patricia (2012). The Nativist Prophets of Early Islamic Iran. Cambridge, New York: Cambridge University Press.
- Crone, Patricia (2018) [2011]. "Ḵorramis". In Yarshater, Ehsan (ed.). Encyclopædia Iranica (Online ed.). Encyclopædia Iranica Foundation.
- Douri, Abdulaziz (2006) [1945]. العصر العباسي الأول؛ دراسة في التاريخ السياسي والإداري والمالي [The Early Abbasid Era: A Study in Political, Administrative and Fiscal History] (in Arabic). Centre for Arab Unity Studies.
- Farrokh, Kaveh (2011). Iran at War: 1500-1988. Bloomsbury Publishing. ISBN 9780755637379.
- Foltz, Richard (2016). Iran: Persia in World History. Oxford University Press. ISBN 978-0-19-933549-7.
- Gordon, Matthew S. (2001). The Breaking of a Thousand Swords: A History of the Turkish Military of Samarra (A.H. 200–275/815–889 C.E.). Albany, New York: State University of New York Press. ISBN 0-7914-4795-2.
- Kazhdan, Alexander, ed. (1991). The Oxford Dictionary of Byzantium. Oxford and New York: Oxford University Press. ISBN 0-19-504652-8.
- Kennedy, Hugh N. (1986). The Early Abbasid Caliphate: A Political History. Croom Helm. ISBN 0709931158.
- Kennedy, Hugh (2001). The Armies of the Caliphs: Military and Society in the Early Islamic State. London and New York: Routledge. ISBN 0-415-25093-5.
- Kennedy, Hugh N. (2004). The Prophet and the Age of the Caliphates: The Islamic Near East from the 6th to the 11th Century (2nd ed.). Longman. ISBN 978-0-582-40525-7.
- Kennedy, Hugh N. (2005). The Court of the Caliphs (Illustrated, reprint ed.). London: Phoenix. p. 326. ISBN 0753818965.
- Laurent, Joseph L. (1919). L'Arménie entre Byzance et l'Islam: depuis la conquête arabe jusqu'en 886 (in French). Paris: De Boccard.
- Lombard, Maurice (2003). The Golden Age of Islam. Markus Wiener Publishers. ISBN 1-55876-322-8.
- Omar, Farouk (2009). الخلافة العباسية: عصر القوة والازدهار [The Abbasid Caliphate: The Era of Power and Prosperity] (in Arabic). Vol. 1. Dar Shorouq.
- Ter-Ghewondyan, Aram (1976) [1965]. The Arab Emirates in Bagratid Armenia. Translated by Garsoïan, Nina. Lisbon: Livraria Bertrand.
- Venetis, Evangelos (2012) [2005]. "Ḵorramis in Byzantium". In Yarshater, Ehsan (ed.). Encyclopædia Iranica (Online ed.). Encyclopædia Iranica Foundation.
- Yusofi, Ḡolām-Ḥosayn (2016) [1988]. "Bābak Ḵorramī". In Yarshater, Ehsan (ed.). Encyclopædia Iranica (Online ed.). Encyclopædia Iranica Foundation.
