= Babek (film) =

- Directed by: Eldar Guliyev
- Screenplay by: Anvar Mammadkhanli
- Starring: Rasim Balayev; Hasanagha Turabov; Amaliya Panahova
- Cinematography: Rasim Ismayilov
- Music by: Polad Bülbüloğlu
- Production companies: Azerbaijanfilm; Mosfilm
- Release date: December 2, 1979
- Running time: 129 minutes
- Country: Soviet Union
- Language: Azerbaijani

Babek (Azerbaijani: Babək) is a 1979 Soviet historical drama film directed by Eldar Guliyev. A joint production between Azerbaijanfilm and Mosfilm, Babek is the most expensive film produced in Azerbaijan SSR. It stars Rasim Balayev in the title role with Hasanagha Turabov playing Abbasid general Afshin. The screenplay was written by novelist Anvar Mammadkhanli.

The film is based on the life of revolutionary leader Babak Khorramdin, whose rebellion against the Abbasid Caliphate spread throughout Iran and Azerbaijan, spanning more than two decades. Under the leadership of Babak, the Khurramiyyah movement strived for an end to despotic foreign rule. However, the rebellion was suppressed with military force by Iranian general Haydar ibn Kawus al-Afshin.

Babek is widely considered to be one of the greatest films of Azerbaijani cinema. The film's cultural impact and legacy still endures in Azerbaijan.

== Plot ==
Babak is represented as a national hero who fought for social equality and common ownership. He is also a hero fighting for the freedom of Azerbaijan against Arab invaders. The film depicts how Babak joins Khurramis, how he rises to the top of the movement, his struggle against various Arab commanders send from Baghdad, and lastly his capture and execution.

== Cast ==
- Rasim Balayev as Babak Khorramdin
- Hasanagha Turabov as Afshin
- Amaliya Panahova as Zarnisa
- Shahmar Alakbarov as Javidan
- Samandar Rzayev as Ibn Bais
- Tamara Yandiyeva as Parvin
- Mammad Verdiyev as Bughdai
- Hamid Azayev as Azrak
- Anvar Hasanov as Tarkhan
- Hamlet Khanizade as Khalifa Motasim
- Hadjimurad Yegizarov as Khalifa Mamun

== Production ==
The film was allocated 650,000 rubles by the USSR State Committee for Cinematography and 1 million rubles by Azerbaijanfilm. At first, Hasan Seyidbayli was attached to direct because of his experience in making history films. However, during the shooting of the film, Seyidbeyli was removed from the project, presumably due to his deteriorating health. The film was then entrusted to director Eldar Guliyev. Prominent Azerbaijani historian Ziya Bunyadov served as an advisor for the film.

Babek was shot in Nakhchivan. Since the filming took place during the grape harvest season, producers wanted to involve masses of locals as extras. For this, the assistance of Nakhchivan leadership was important. However, authorities were reluctant in slowing down the grape harvest. At this point, Heydar Aliyev, First Secretary of the Central Committee of the Azerbaijan Communist Party, intervened. He instructed the Nakhchivan leadership to create all necessary conditions for the filming of Babek and even said, "No problem, Nakhchivan can harvest fewer grapes this year." The Babak Fort scenes were shot in the fields between Nakhchivan and Julfa. The castle seen in the film was a set decoration. At the time of filming, 16 factories not only in Azerbaijan but also in Georgia, Tashkent, and Moscow made more than 1,500 sets of clothes for the film. Numerous factories donated swords, shields, and other necessary weapons to the creative team free of charge. Over five thousand people took part in the shootings. 170 horsemen were brought from Mosfilm's Cavalry Regiment in Moscow.

Rasim Balayev, who later received the title People's Artist of Azerbaijan SSR, played Babak. Recalling those years, Balayev said: "I was invited to the auditions. They liked the audition and I was approved. The shooting lasted for several months. We did it in Nakhchivan, Ramana Tower, the studio's pavilion, and the Ateshgah Temple in Surakhani. The sets were so skillfully built that they didn't feel like a decoration.

I went to horseriding, swimming, and fencing training with a few other actors. We were in training for about 2 to 3 months. I mainly had problems with horseriding. I was injured significantly because I fell off a horse several times. Even now I suffer from that. I have a lot of back pain, and when I go to the doctor, they say that it was caused by a trauma. I didn't feel it that much when I was young. Age and injuries now speak for themselves. Tough situations arose because it was a big production and also because it involved so many people. You could sometimes see an actor swing the sword incorrectly and wound the other guy's shoulder, arm, or leg. Many were wounded, fell off their horses, and had their hands damaged by the sword. My hands were swollen from holding a spear and a sword. The clothes I wore with Anvar Hasanov (Tarkhan) were made of pigskin. We wore more than 30 kilograms of swords and shields.

We were on the set from 6 in the morning to 11 in the evening. Everyone got up early in the morning and got ready. 5 or 6 costumers dressed thousands of people. It took hours. Everything was difficult. When the crowd was ready, they brought us to the set. There were special rules and regulations. Gathering 4-5 thousand people and making a film was not an easy task. Just imagine that in 50 degrees Celsius heat, the foreheads of the horses were covered with wet towels to protect them from the sun. The copper helmets on our heads were hot and burning our heads. We took off our helmets as soon as we could because of the heat."

== Themes ==
Babak's place in Azerbaijani history and culture may seem strange at first, considering the fact that most Azerbaijanis are Muslims and Babak is known for his resistance against Muslim Arabs and the Caliphate. However, this actually represents the strong Muslim secularism in Azerbaijan SSR. Following the Russian colonial rule, powers of the clerical establishment were severely restricted and unlike the rest of the Muslim world, secular intellectuals had a chance to publish and proselytize their own works. The secularization process continued during the Soviet period as well, and this can explain why identifying with a figure like Babak does not bear inherent conflict for most Muslim Azerbaijanis. In the movie the rebellion is not motivated by religious factors; the conflict portrayed has its seeds in patterns of property ownership and nationalism. Babak is represented as a hero fighting for the equality and freedom of Azerbaijanis.

There are many elements of symbolism in the movie. The color red is associated with Khurramis and the color black with Arabs and the Caliphate. When Afshin offers Babak his cooperation to overthrow the Arab Caliphate to establish an Iranian state, Babak rejects this offer and replies: "I have committed to ideals which demand freedom or death. Either you will be destroyed under the black flag of the caliphate or I will be destroyed under the red flag of the Khurramis." The Arab army is associated with destruction, fire, and slavery. In one scene, on the route of the Arab army, we see a vulture on a dead body and a crying child next to a dead mother.

Iran and Azerbaijan are treated as two separate entities in the film. Many Azerbaijani scholars assert that during this period the population of the region was Turkic, hence different from the rest of Iran. This is objectively false as the Turkic migrations to the region occurred in the 11th century due to the Seljuq Turks conquests. In the film, Tabriz is clearly referenced to as Azerbaijani land.

== Reception ==
Babek did very well in the Soviet box office, with more than 35 million viewers during its first year. It has been screened in more than 60 countries.

One review of the film states: "The emotional impact of the film not only baffles the audience but also surprises. Many elements of the film are rooted in Babak's idea of freedom and human love. In the screenplay, the image of Babak is not simply idolized as a historical hero. He was also portrayed as a member of a society that was close to the poor; he helped those seeking salvation, and became the heroic son of the people."
