= Mankjur al-Farghani =

9th-century Iranian Abbasid general

Mankjur or Minkajur al-Farghani (Arabic: منكجور الفرغاني) or al-Ushrusani (Arabic: منكجور الأشروسني) was a 9th-century Iranian military officer in the service of the Abbasid Caliphate. He was a cousin of the prominent Abbasid general Khaydhar ibn Kawus al-Afshin, thus belonging to the ruling family of Ushrusana. Mankjur accompanied al-Afshin in his campaign against the Khurramite Babak Khorramdin, and was later appointed as governor of Adharbayjan by him in 837. However, in 839, Mankjur, after refusing to give the caliph al-Mu'tasim some of Babak's booty, revolted against him. Al-Mu'tasim responded by sending against him Bugha al-Kabir, who managed to suppress his revolt and imprison him in Samarra. The affair of Mankjur raised suspicions about the loyalty of the al-Afshin, who was accused of encouraging the revolt, and contributed to the general's own downfall in the following year.

== Name and background ==
Mankjur's nisbah is given variously by the sources as al-Ushrusani or al-Farghani, respectively indicating an origin from the Central Asian provinces of Ushrusana or Farghana. Historian Clifford Edmund Bosworth believed that the first element of Mankjur's name may have been a corruption of the Turkish "ming/bing '1,000' or mengü 'eternal, everlasting,'" and that Mankjur may have been a Turkish slave soldier imported into Farghana prior to entering caliphal service.

According to Vladimir Minorsky, the Mingechaur ford (now the Mingachevir reservoir in Azerbaijan) of the Kura River was named after Mankjur, who may have been active in the area during his time in Adharbayjan.

== Career ==
Map of Adharbayjan in the ninth century.

Mankjur was a kinsman of the Ushrusanan ruler al-Afshin, one of the leading military figures during the caliphate of al-Mu'tasim (r. 833–842); according to al-Ya'qubi he was the uncle of one of al-Afshin's sons. During al-Afshin's campaign against the Khurramite rebel Babak Khorramdin in Adharbayjan (835–837), Mankjur was dispatched by the general to fight against a separate revolt in Warthan. In 837, following the victory over Babak, Mankjur was appointed by al-Afshin to serve as his resident governor of Adharbayjan, while al-Afshin himself departed the province and returned to Samarra.

According to al-Tabari, Mankjur was believed to have acted in a corrupt manner during his governorship, appropriating for himself a large sum of money hidden away by Babak rather than forwarding it to the caliph. His alleged activities were soon revealed by the postmaster of Adharbayjan, who wrote to al-Mu'tasim and informed him about the money. Mankjur immediately wrote to the caliph in response, calling the accusation a lie, and the dispute between him and the postmaster quickly escalated. Mankjur eventually decided to kill the postmaster, but the latter sought refuge in Ardabil, prompting Mankjur to attack the city in retaliation.

News of these events reached al-Mu'tasim, who responded by ordering al-Afshin to send someone to dismiss Mankjur. Al-Afshin accordingly dispatched Abi'l-Saj Devdad to the province, but allegations began to circulate that al-Afshin was in fact secretly supporting Mankjur, and al-Mu'tasim decided to send Bugha al-Kabir to fight Mankjur instead. Mankjur now came out openly in rebellion, but was soon defeated on the field and forced to retreat. He then rebuilt a mountain fortress which had been destroyed by Babak and fortified himself in it, relying on the mountain's inaccessibility to defend him. Despite this, his rebellion came to an end less than a month later; varying accounts state that he was either betrayed by his men and handed over to the caliphal army, or that he received a guarantee of safe conduct from Bugha. In any case, he was brought back by Bugha to Samarra, where al-Mu'tasim ordered him to be thrown into prison.

Mankjur's rebellion proved damaging to the reputation of al-Afshin, who was suspected of secretly corresponding with Mankjur and encouraging him to revolt. This belief, combined with other accusations of treason against the caliph, ultimately resulted in al-Afshin being arrested in 840 for conspiring against the state, and led to his imprisonment and death in the following year.

== Sources ==
- Gordon, Matthew S. (2001). The Breaking of a Thousand Swords: A History of the Turkish Military of Samarra (A.H. 200–275/815–889 C.E.). Albany, New York: State University of New York Press. ISBN 0-7914-4795-2.
- Madelung, Wilfred (1988). "Banu Saj". In Yarshater, Ehsan (ed.). Encyclopaedia Iranica. Columbia University.
- Mottahedeh, Roy (1975). "The ʿAbbāsid Caliphate in Iran". In Frye, Richard N. (ed.). The Cambridge History of Iran. Vol. 4. Cambridge: Cambridge University Press. pp. 57–90. ISBN 0-521-20093-8.
- Minorsky, V. (1953). Studies in Caucasian History. London and Bradford: Lund Humphries and Co. ISBN 9780521057356.
- Bosworth, C. E., ed. (1991). The History of al-Ṭabarī, Volume XXXIII: Storm and Stress Along the Northern Frontiers of the ʿAbbāsid Caliphate: The Caliphate of al-Muʿtasim, A.D. 833–842/A.H. 218–227. SUNY Series in Near Eastern Studies. Albany, New York: State University of New York Press. ISBN 978-0-7914-0493-5.
- Al-Ya'qubi, Ahmad ibn Abu Ya'qub (1883). Houtsma, M. Th. (ed.). Historiae, Vol. 2. Leiden: E. J. Brill.
