= Muhammad ibn al-Ba'ith =

Muhammad ibn al-Ba'ith ibn Halbas (Arabic: محمد بن البعيث بن حلبس) (circa early 9th century) also known as Ibn Ba'ith (Son of Ba'ith) was an Arab governor of Marand during the Abbasid caliphate.

After the Arab conquest of Persia, Halbas (his grandfather), who was a mercenary took Marand. Muhammad ibn al-Ba'ith built castles in Marand and eventually took Tabriz (815 AD) and Shahi (a place near Lake Urmia). He started in good terms with the Khurramite movement of Babak, but later joined the Caliph against the Khurramites by capturing one of Babak's generals. However, his relationship with the Abbasids did not last long and he was imprisoned under the Caliphate of Mutawwakil. Ibn Khordadbeh who wrote in 848 AD mentions Marand as being Muhammad ibn al-Ba'iths fiefdom. The historian al-Tabari retells a very graphic expedition sent against the town. Tabari states that there were walls which enclosed Marand, and its garden's was a Farsang in circumference. The forest outside of the town gave the town of Marand further protection. Ibn Ba'ith had collected some 2200 adventurers, reinforced by a number of non-Arab Iranian elements. But this was not enough and he was seized in around 849-850 AD by the forces of the Abbasid caliphate. When he was taken to the court of Mutawwakil, the Caliph ordered Ibn Ba'ith to be beheaded. However, Ibn Ba'ith recited some Arabic poetry and Mutawwakil was amazed by his poetic gifts. Subsequently he was only imprisoned and he died in prison.

Ibn Ba'ith was also considerably Iranicized and the elders of Maragha praised his bravery and quoted his Persian poetry. His Persian poetry also is an evidence of the existence of the cultivation of poetry in Persian in northwest Iran (Azerbaijan) at the beginning of the 9th century.
