= Abu Dulaf al-Ijli =

Abū Dulaf al-Qāsim ibn ‘Īsā al-‘Ijlī
- Died: 840/841; Baghdad
- Occupation(s): emir, governor, writer, poet

Abū Dulaf (Note: The proper noun ’Dulaf’ of the second declension derives from dālif (lente incedens). See de Sacy Grammaire arabe, tom. I, p.408 (2nd ed.).) al-Qāsim ibn ‘Īsā ibn Ma‘qil ibn Idrīs al-‘Ijlī (ابو دُلَف القاسم بن عيسى بن مَعْقِل بن ادريس العِجْلى) was an Arab military commander under the Abbasid caliphs al-Ma’mūn and al-Mu‘taṣim. His father had commenced construction of the city of Karaj (Note: The city of al-Karaj lies between Isfahan and Hamadan in the region of Jibal or Persian Iraq, in which al-Rayy and Zanjān also lie.) in Jibal, the tribal residence of the Banū Ijlī; (Note: The Ijlī of Ijl ibn Lujaim were a branch of the Banū Rabiat al-Faras. Ijl ibn Lujaim ibn Saab ibn Alī ibn Bakr ibn Wail was lampooned by Abū Ubaydah.) as governor, Abū Dulaf completed its construction. He was an illustrious man of letters and science, a brilliant poet, a musical composer, a talented vocalist, and an expert on the Bedouin dialect. His generosity was proverbial. He died at Baghdad in 226 or 225 AH [840–2 AD].

Isḥāq al-Nadīm gives the quote from Abū Dulaf: "Handwriting is the garden of the sciences."

== Life ==
His full (genealogical) name was Abū Dulaf (Note: From Isḥāq al-Nadīm's account in Chap. 3, § 2, Government officials who wrote books.) al-Qāsim ibn Īsā ibn Idrīs ibn Ma’qil ibn ‘Umayr ibn Sheikh ibn Muawia ibn Khosāi ibn ‘Abd al-Uzza ibn Dulaf ibn Jushm ibn Kais ibn Sa’ad ibn ‘Ijl ibn Lujaym ibn Sa’ab ibn ‘Alī ibn Bakr ibn Wā’il ibn Qasit ibn Hinb ibn Afsa ibn Dumī ibn Jadila ibn Asad ibn Rabia ibn Nizar ibn Ma’ad ibn Adnān al-Ijlī.

He was a lord and emir (Note: He was a man of noble lineage, a general and a governor.) of his people. His grand-uncle, ‘Īsā ibn Ma’qil, who adopted Abū Muslim al-Khurāsānī (Note: For Abū Muslim al-Khurāsānī see Khallikān, II, 101-8) was his grandfather Idrīs's brother. The emir Abū Naṣr ‘Alī ibn Māqūla, author of Kitāb al-Ikmāl ('Book of Completion'), was his descendant. Quṭrub the Grammarian of the Baṣrah school tutored his sons, as did Quṭrub's son, al-Ḥasan.

From an early age Abū Dulaf's poetic talents won him favour with the Abbāsid caliph Harun al-Rashid, who appointed him governor of Jabal. He suppressed raids by nomadic Kurds and Bedouin Arabs against the city of Karaj, and captured the famous qarqur brigand that operated in the area. When Hārūn died in 809 AD and civil war broke out between the caliph's sons, Al-Amin and Al-Ma'mūn, Abu-Dülaf supported al-Amin. However Al-Amin's general Alī ibn ‘Īsā ibn Mahan was killed by the forces of Al-Mamūn led by Tahir ibn Ḥusayn, and Abū-Dulaf retreated to Karaj, where he pledged to remain neutral yet refused to swear allegiance to Al-Mamūn while al-Amīn was alive. On al-Amin's death in 813 Al-Ma'mūn forgave him and he was reappointed governor of Jabal. As governor during the successive reigns of al-Ma’mūn, Al-Mu'tasim and the emir Al-Wāthiq, he expanded the territory to include Isfahan and Qazvin, and repelled Daylamite attacks. He served in the campaign against Babak Khorramdin in Azerbaijan (836/837), under Khaydhar ibn Kawus al-Afshin. As governor in Damascus he narrowly escaped a plot against him by Al-Afshin, receiving a warning from the qāḍī Ibn Abī Dā’ūd. He then made the pilgrimage to Mecca and died in Baghdad on 839/840. Khallikān relates an account that speaks to his Shiite and Mutazilite sympathies. When ten sharīf (Note: Descendants of Muhammad.) travel from Khurāsān to visit Abū Dulaf on his deathbed, he rewards them in return for a written statement of the genealogy of each; "the son of such a one, etc., the son of Alī ibn Abī Ṭālib by Fāṭima the daughter of the Apostle of God," and a declaration that read: "‘Apostle of God’, that, in relief of my distress and misery in my native town, Abū Dulaf al-Ijlī gave two thousand pieces of gold for thy favour and intercession.’”

In a further account about a dream of Abū Dulaf's son's, the son meets his father in some afterlife world called the Barzakh, (Note: ’Barzakh'; the intermediary world between death and resurrection.) and his father says:

If after death we were left (in peace), death would be a repose for all the living beings; but when we die we are raised up again and questioned respecting all we have done.

— Khallikān, (1843) II, p. 505

== Works ==
Among his books were:

- Kitāb al-Bazāt wa’l-Ṣaīd (كتاب البزاة والصيد) ‘Falcons and Hunting’;
- Kitāb al-Nazah (كتاب النزة) ‘Purity of Soul’ (Al-Nazh) (or ‘Amusements’ [Al- Nuzah]; on country estates);
- Kitāb al-Silāḥ (كتاب السلاح) ‘Weapons’; (Note: Last two titles omitted in the Beatty MS.)
- Kitāb Sīasat al-Mulūk (كتاب سياسة الملوك) Policies of Princes.
- Poetry (Note: Isḥāq al-Nadīm lists Abū Dulaf and his brother, Ma‘qil ibn ‘Īsā, among the poets of the Abbāsid period and records that Abū Dulaf composed one hundred leaves of poetry, while his brother composed a small quantity.)

== Legacy ==
Several accounts tell of the lavish beneficence Abū Dulaf bestowed on poets, who recompensed him in eulogy, or qaṣīdah, celebrating his military prowess. Among these poets were:

- Al-ʿAkawwak (Note: For the poet al-’Akawwak, see Khallikān.).
- Abū Tammām al-Tāi
- Bakr ibn al-Nattāh, (Note: Abū Wāil Bakr ibn al-Nattāh ibn Ai Himār al-Hanafī, poet in the reign of caliph Hārūn al-Rashīd who lived in Baghdād and was an associate of the poet Abū al-Atāhiya (fl. 748–828).)

His excessive generosity, gullibility and inevitable debt, satirised in stories of his life, have echoes of Shakespeare’s Timon of Athens. One example is expressed in the verse by the Khalidite Abū Bakr Muḥammad ibn Hishām:

"Poets are convinced that their hopes in you are safe from misfortune. Alchemy is a false science for ordinary mortals but not for them. You give them bags of money for words on paper."

Another example is found in the saying spoken by the reluctant mawla, ibn Abī Fatn Sālih, to his wife who would send him to war:

Do you think that my heart contains the breast of Abū Dulaf? (Note: For Arabic idioms see A.I.S. de Sacy Chrestomathie, tom. II, p.399.).

His descendants, known as the Dulafids, played a political role in the Jabal region for about fifty years.

== Bibliography ==
- Creswell, K. A C. (1940). Early Muslim Architecture. Vol. II. Oxford.
- Herzfeld, Ernst (1948). Geschichte der Stadt Samarra (in German). Hamburg: Eckardt & Messtorff; Buchhändlerischer Vertrieb durch D. Reimer, Andrews & Steiner.
- Khallikān (Ibn), Aḥmad ibn Muḥammad (1843). Ibn Khallikān's Biographical Dictionary (translation of Wafayāt al-A'yān wa-Anbā'). Vol. II. Translated by MacGuckin de Slane. London: W.H. Allen. pp. 502–506.
- Nadīm (al-), Abū al-Faraj Muḥammad ibn Isḥāq Abū Ya’qūb al-Warrāq (1970). Dodge, Bayard (ed.). The Fihrist of al-Nadim; a tenth-century survey of Muslim culture. New York & London: Columbia University Press.
- Taghrī-Birdī (Ibn), Abū al-Maḥāsin Yūsuf (1963). Popper, William (ed.). Al-Nujūm al-Zāhirah fī Mulūk Miṣr wa-al-Qāhirah (in Arabic). Vol. 2. Cairo: Dār ak-Kutub al-Miṣrīyah. pp. 243–4.
