= Samandar Rzayev =

- Azerbaijani: Səməndər Rzayev
- Born: Səməndər Mənsim oğlu Rzayev; 2 January 1945; Agsu, Azerbaijan SSR, USSR
- Died: 27 March 1986 (aged 41); Baku, Azerbaijan SSR, USSR
- Citizenship: Soviet Union
- Education: Azerbaijan State University of Culture and Arts
- Occupation: Actor
- Years active: 1967-1986
- Children: Rashid Samandar
- Awards: State Prize of the Azerbaijan SSR Honored Artist of the Azerbaijan SSR

Samandar Rzayev (Azerbaijani: Səməndər Mənsim oğlu Rzayev, 2 January 1945 — 27 March 1986) was an Azerbaijani actor. He was awarded the title Honored Artist of the Azerbaijan SSR (1974), and Laureate of the State Prize of the Azerbaijan SSR (1980).

== Biography ==
Samandar Rzayev was born on 2 January 1945 in Agsu. He worked in a drama club in Agsu District. In 1964-1968 he studied at the faculty of drama and film acting of the Azerbaijan State Theater Institute named after Mirzaagha Aliyev. Adil Isgandarov, Mehdi Mammadov and Rza Tahmasib were his teachers. In 1968, while S.Rzayev was studying in the last year of the institute, he was admitted to the troupe of the Azerbaijan State Academic National Drama Theatre with the invitation of the chief director Tofig Kazimov. His first role was Horatio in William Shakespeare's Hamlet tragedy.

The actor died from cirrhosis of the liver on 27 March 1986.

== Awards ==
- Honored Artist of the Azerbaijan SSR — 1 June 1974
- State Prize of the Azerbaijan SSR — 1980

== Filmography ==
- Birthday
- Babamizin Babasinin Babasi
- Babek
- Bagh Movsumu
- Bayin Oghurlanmasi
- Dali Kur
- Evlari Kondalan Yar
- Nesimi

== Sources ==
- Azərbaycan Respublikası Mədəniyyət Nazirliyi. C.Cabbarlı adına "Azərbaycanfilm" kinostudiyası. Aydın Kazımzadə. Bizim "Azərbaycanfilm". 1923-2003-cü illər. Bakı: Mütərcim, 2004.- səh. 53.
- Hüseynov, F. “Bu kino ki var...”: Unudulmaz aktyor Səməndər Rzayevin xatirəsi yad edildi: [Dövlət Film Fondunda] //Mədəniyyət. - 2015.- 6 mart.- S.5.
- Kazımzadə, A. Kral Aktyor: [Əməkdar artist Səməndər Rzayev haqqında] //Kaspi.- 2015.- 14-16 mart.- S.14.
