= Babak Fort =

Castle in Kaleybar County, Iranian national heritage site

Coordinates: 38.8369°N 46.9812°E

- قلعه بابک / دژبذ
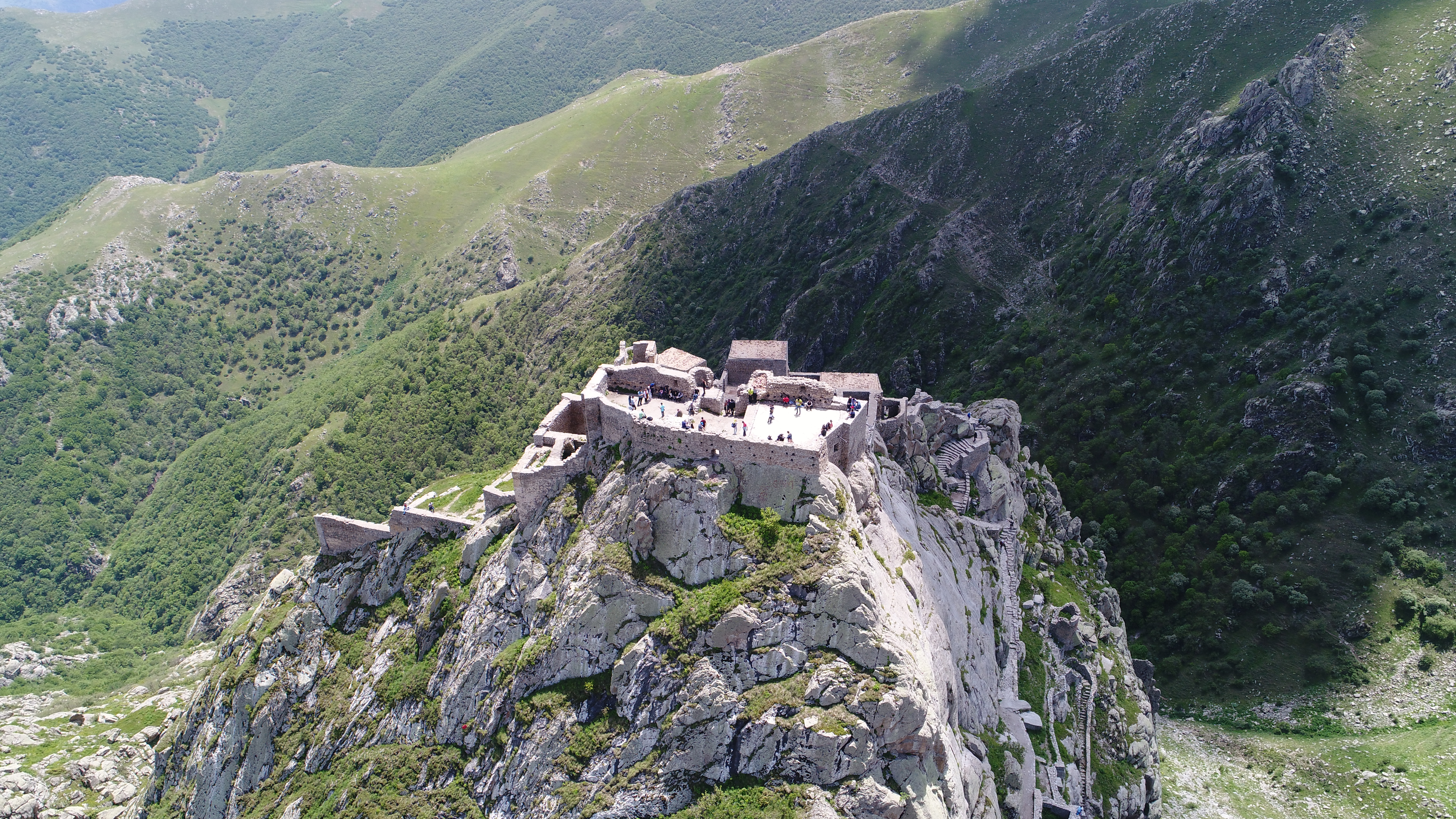
- Babak Castle

Site information
- Type: Citadel

Iran National Heritage List
- Official name: Babak Fort
- Type: Fort
- Designated: 1967
- Reference no.: 623
- Conservation organization: Cultural Heritage, Handicrafts and Tourism Organization of Iran

Pāpak Fort or Babak Castle (Persian: قلعه بابک, romanized: Ghal’eh-e Bābak), is a large citadel on the top of a mountain in the Arasbaran forests, 50 km from Ahar, one parasang from Ardabil, 6 km southwest of Kalibar City in northwestern Iran. According to Ibn al- Nadim, it was the stronghold of Javidhan and Babak Khorramdin, the leaders of the Khurramites in Iranian Azerbaijan who fought the Islamic Abbasid Caliphate. The fort was conquered and ruined by Abbasid general Afshin's army in 837.

== Access ==
The castle is built at an altitude of 2300–2600 meters.

The surrounding Arasbaran oak forest, jagged cliffs and mountains in the distance can be seen from the castle. The last stretch to the main castle is a narrow passageway and a 200-meter corridor-shaped temple. The castle is nearly impossible to capture, due to its elevated location in the mountains and being protected by ice and snow.

== History ==
The castle is believed to date to the Parthian era, with modifications during the Sasanian era.

=== Khurramites in the fort ===
The movement of Khurramites in Azerbaijan was associated with Javidhan who was a landlord leader of one of the two Khurramite movements in Azerbaijan (from 807–808 to 816–817), with his headquarters being in Badd, located close to the Aras river. The leader of the other Khurramite movement was Abu Imran, who often clashed with Javidhans forces. During one of the clashes, in probably 816, Abu Imran was defeated and killed, whilst Javidhan was mortally wounded, dying three days later. Javidhan was succeeded by his apprentice Babak Khorramdin, who also married Javidhan's widow.

Tabari records that Babak started his revolt in 816–817. In 827–828 Moḥammad b. Ḥomayd was sent to overcome Babak.

Despite several victories, his troops were defeated by Babak during the last battle at Hashtadsar in 829. Caliph Al-Ma′mun's moves against Babak had failed when he died in 833. Babak's victories over Arab generals were associated with his possession of Badd fort and the inaccessible mountain stronghold, according to Arab historians who mentioned that his influence also extended to the territories of today’s Azerbaijan Republic- "southward to near Ardabīl and Marand, eastward to the Caspian Sea and the Shamakhi district and Shervan, northward to the Mughan (Moḡān) steppe and the Aras river bank, westward to the districts of Julfa, Nakhchivan, and Marand".

The last battle between the Arab caliphate and the Khurramites took place in the fortress of Badd on 837. The Khurramites were defeated and Afshin reached Badd. Afshin had additional forces from the Caliphate under the Arab magnate Abū Dolaf and settled in a camp six miles away from Badd fortress. He used this camp as a base for mountain attacks against Badd. After setting up siege machinery and naphtha-throwers, he was able to invade Badd. The Khurramites were defeated and after capturing the Badd fortress, Babak escaped, but was later captured and executed.

=== Present day ===
The remaining parts of the fortress are currently known as Qaḷʿa-ye Jomhūr. It is situated 50km from Ahar on the left branch of Qarasū river. A castle and a palace on atop a mountain remain from the Badd fort.

At the site has been found 13th-century coin and pottery samples as well as carved and glazed pottery, dating to the beginning of the 7th century.

== Gallery ==
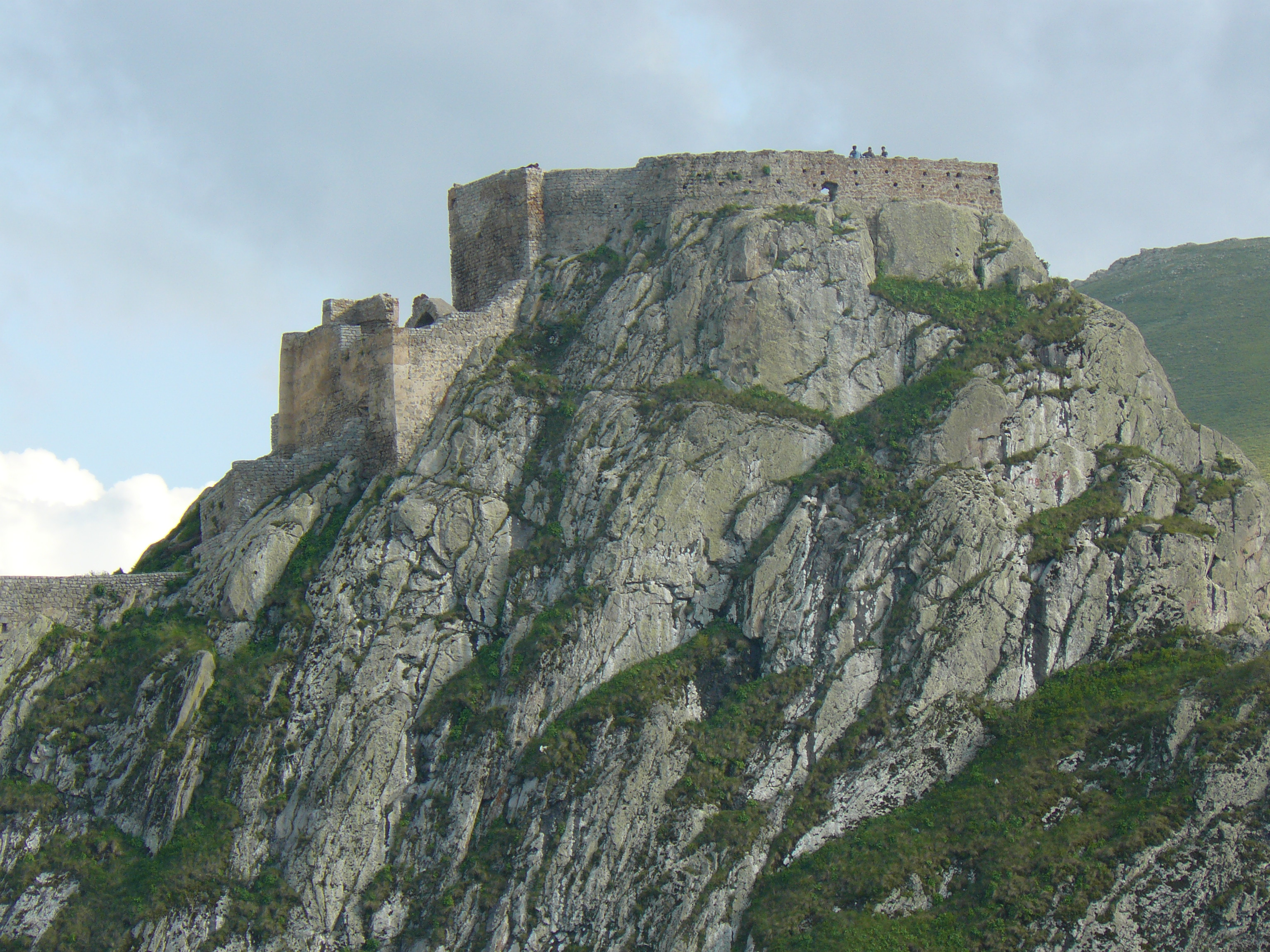
Babak Fort

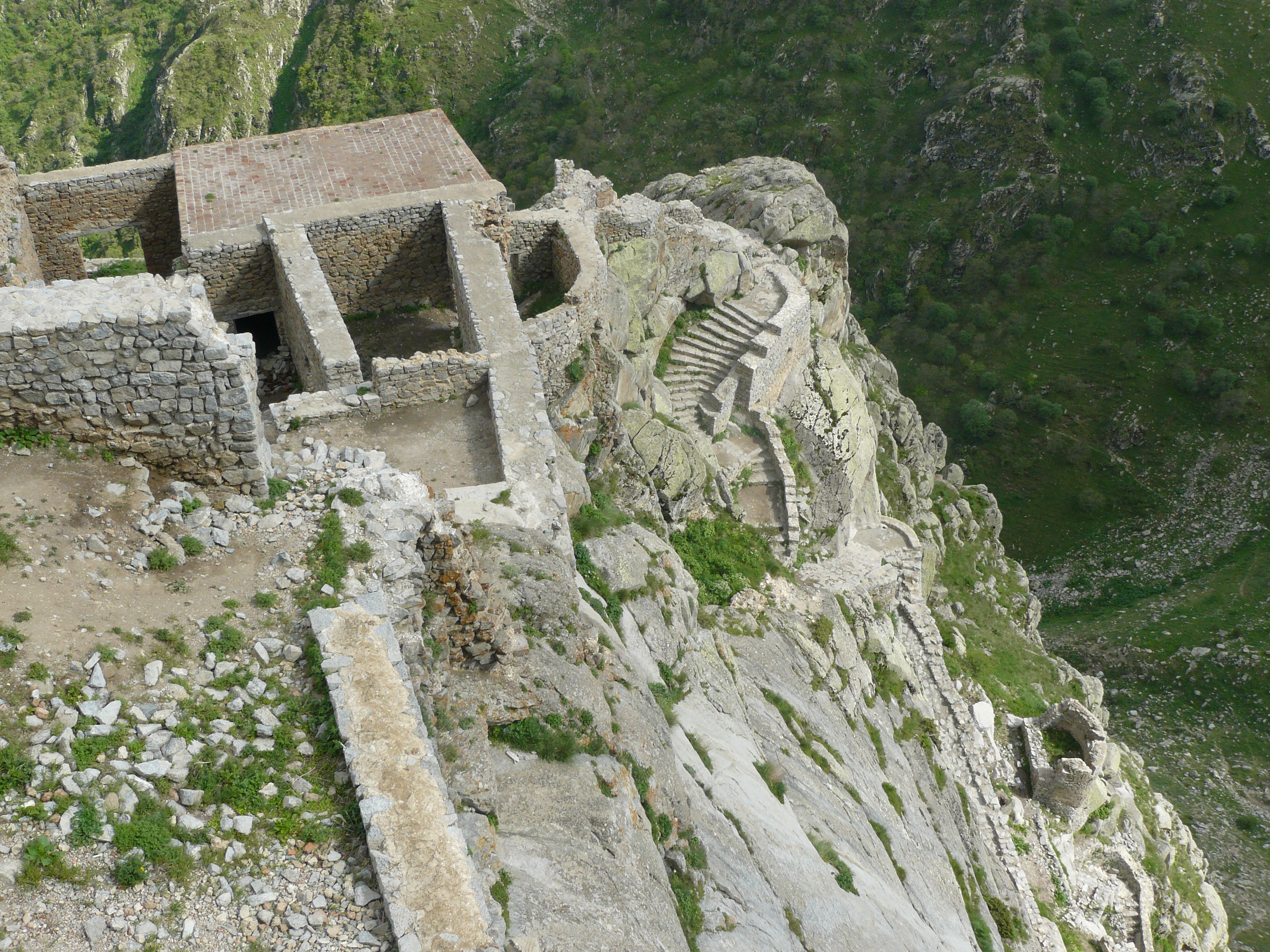
Babak Fort

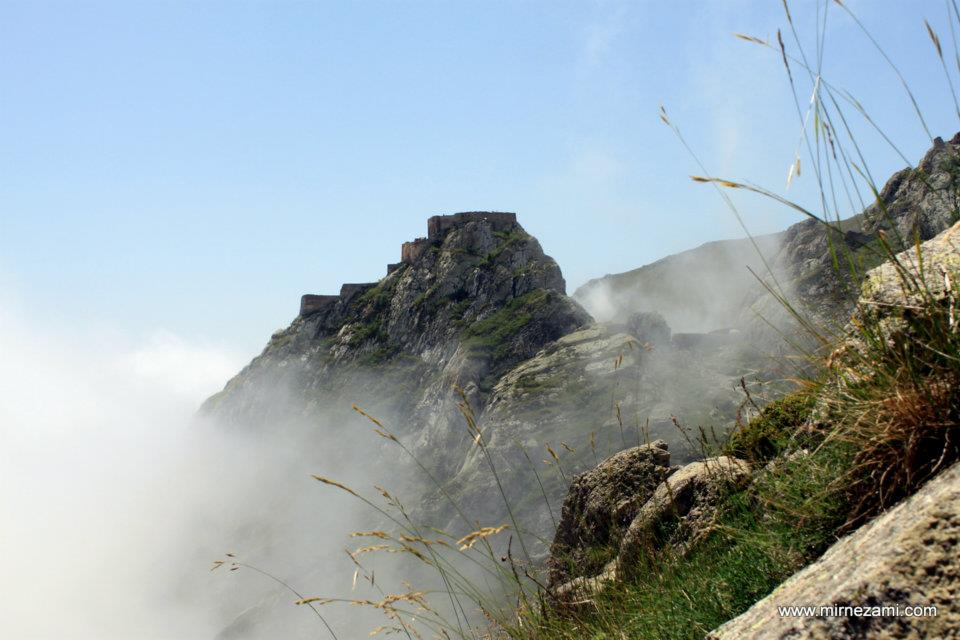
Babak Castle

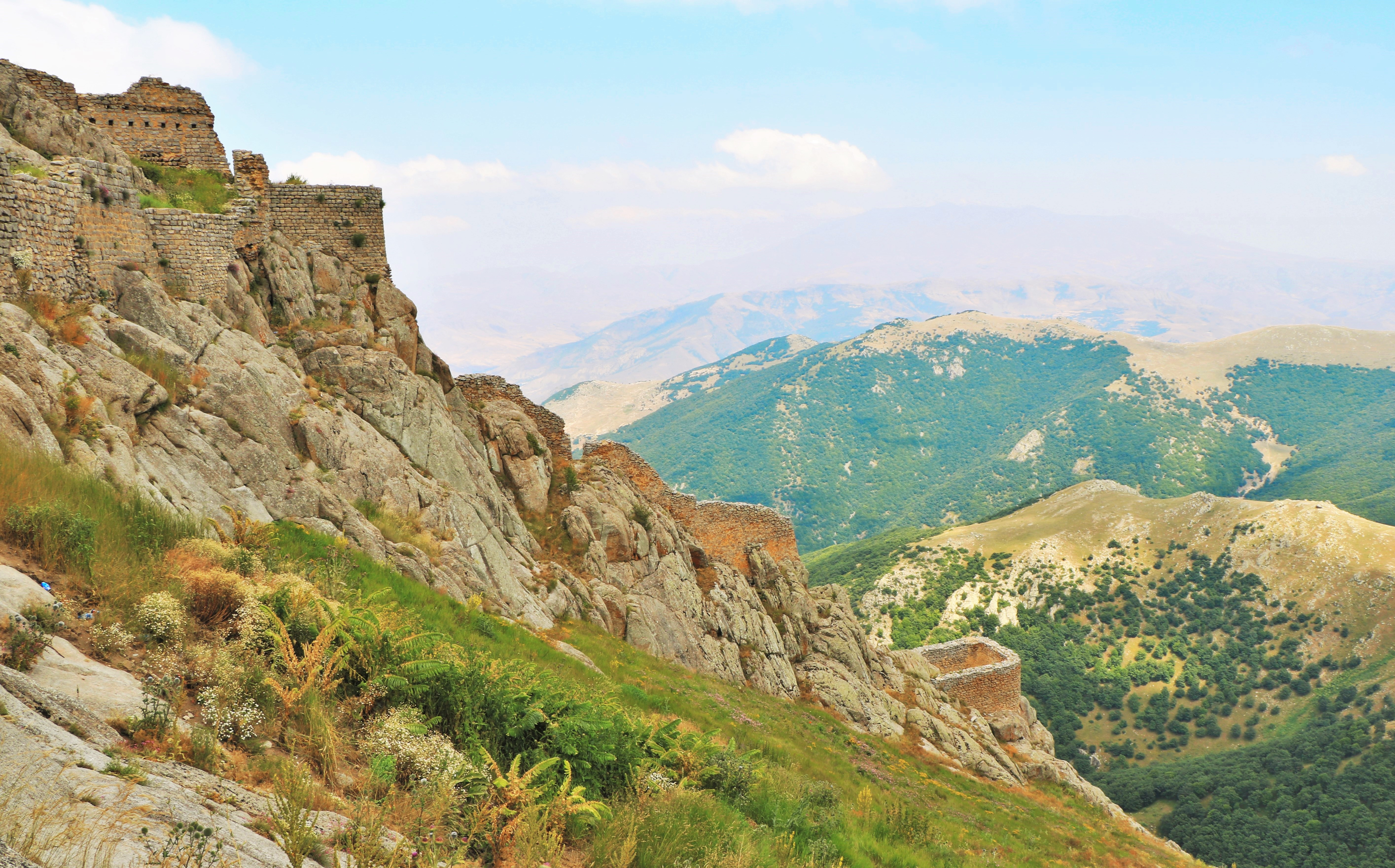
Babak Fort

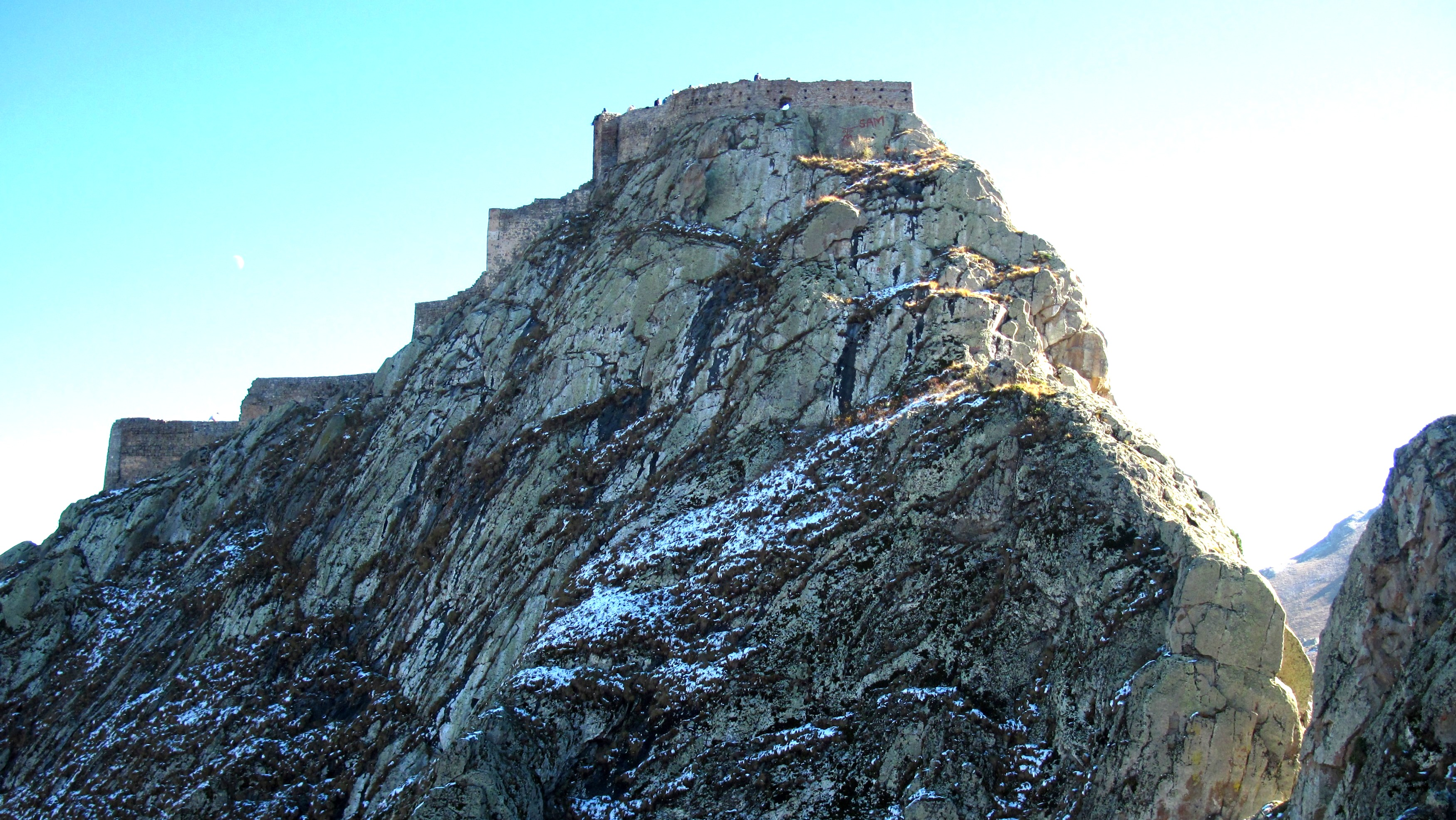
Babak Fort

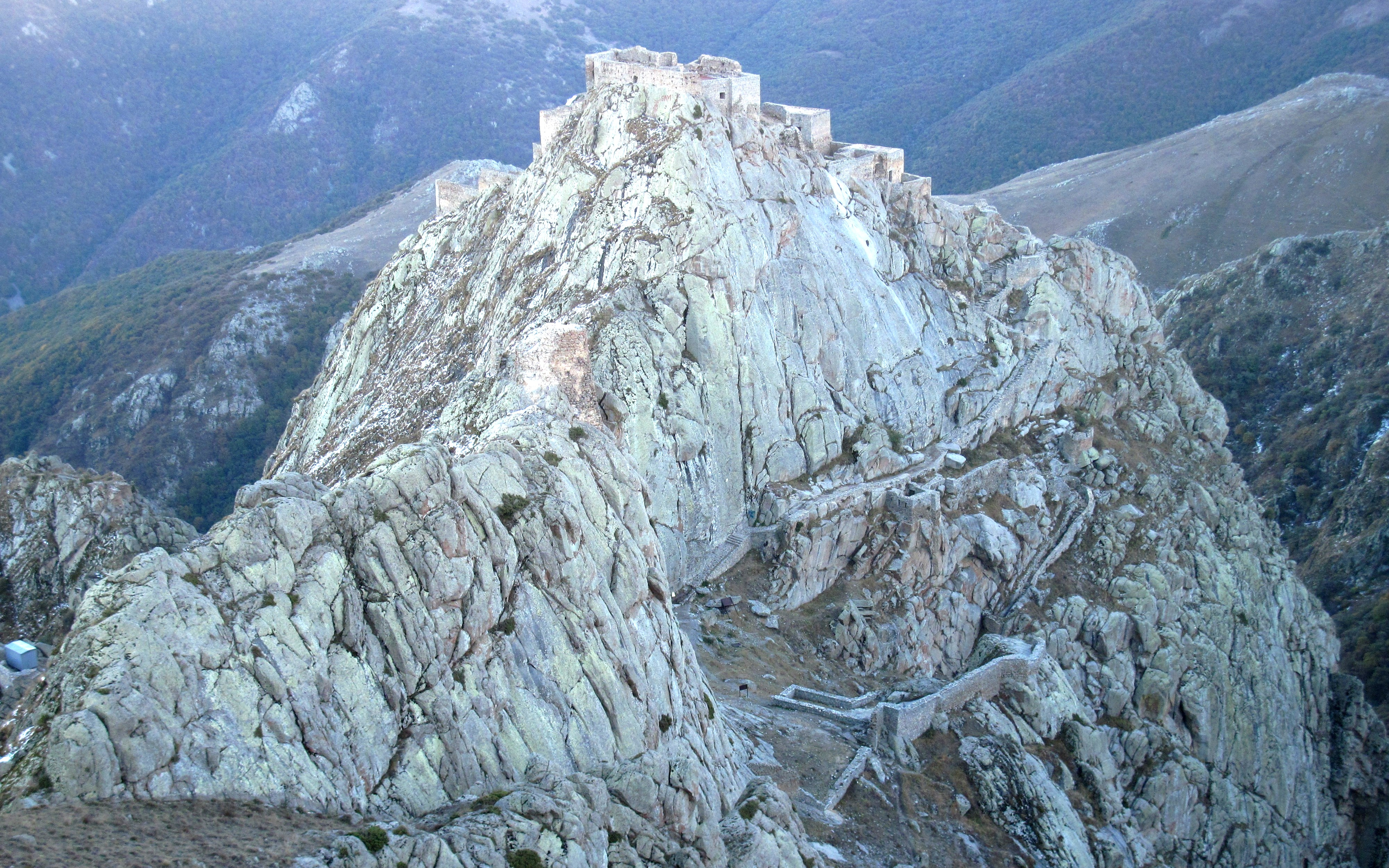
Babak Castle

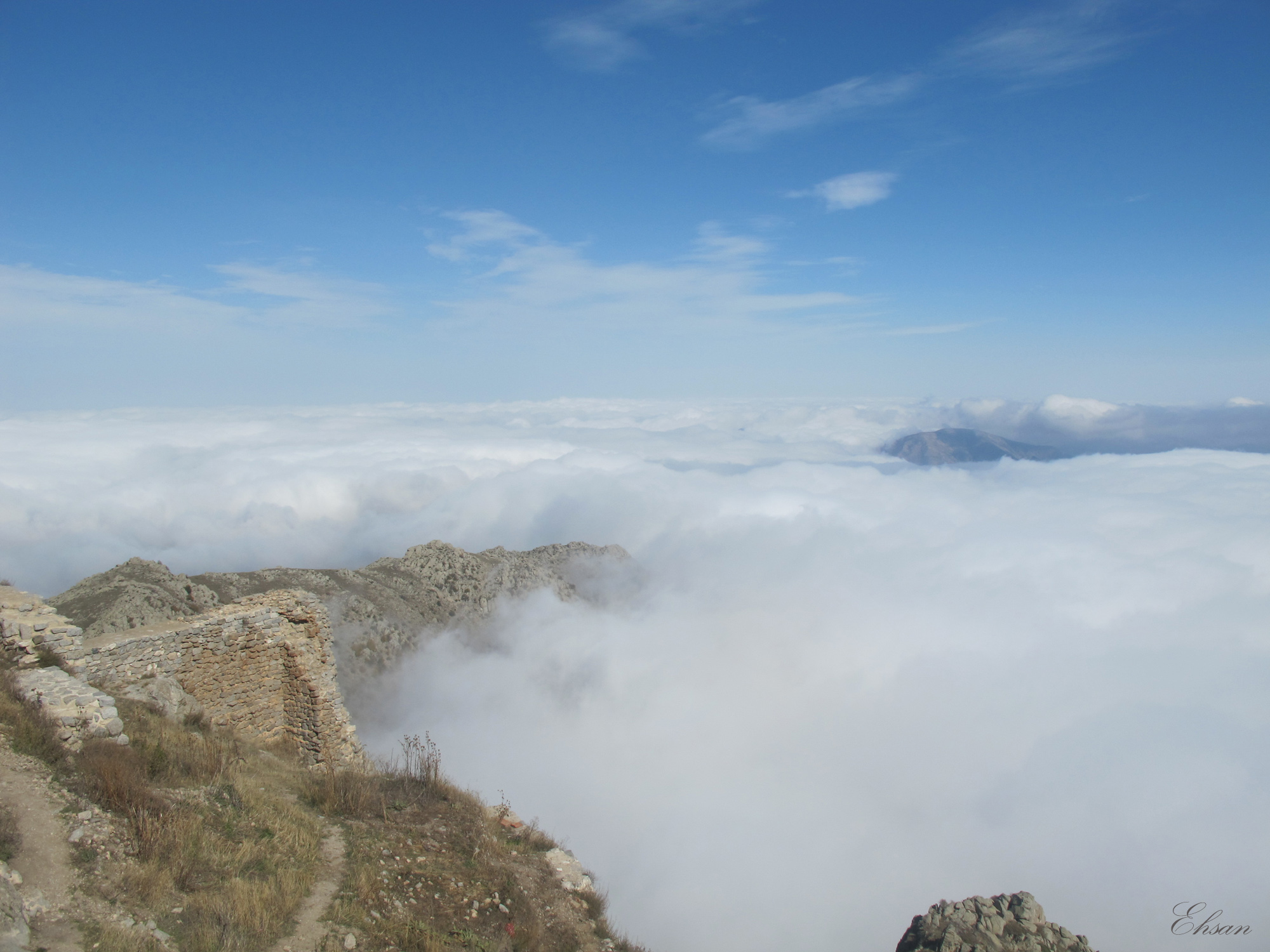
Babak Fort

== See also ==
- Iranian architecture
- Arasbaran forests
- Atashgah Castle
- List of castles in Iran
