= Javidhan =

Map of Azerbaijan in the 9th-century.

Javidhan ibn Sahl was an Iranian landlord and leader of one of the two Khurramite movements in Azerbaijan, with his headquarters being in Badhdh. The leader of the other Khurramite movement was a certain Abu Imran, who often clashed with Javidhans forces. During one of the clashes, in probably the early 810s, Abu Imran was defeated and killed, whilst Javidhan was mortally wounded, dying three days later. Javidhan was succeeded by his apprentice Babak Khorramdin, who also married Javidhan's widow. Javidhan was survived by a son, who was most likely too young to succeed him.

== Sources ==
- SOURDEL, D (1986). "BĀBAK". Encyclopaedia of Islam. Vol. 1 (2nd ed.). Leiden: E. J. Brill. p. 844. ISBN 90-04-08114-3.
- Yusofi, GH. -H. (2011). "Bābak Ḵorramī". Encyclopaedia Iranica, Vol. III, Fasc. 3. pp. 299–306.
- Frye, R. N. (1988). "Bābak (1)". Encyclopaedia Iranica, Vol. III, Fasc. 3. pp. 298–299.
- Bahramian, Ali; Hirtenstein, Stephen; Gholami, Rahim (2013). "Bābak Khurram-Dīn". In Wilferd Madelung; Farhad Daftary (eds.). Encyclopedia Islamica. BRILL Online.
- Yarshater, E. (1988). "Azerbaijan vii. The Iranian Language of Azerbaijan". Encyclopaedia Iranica, Vol. III, Fasc. 3. pp. 238–245.
- Crone, Patricia (2011). "Bābak". In Kate Fleet; Gudrun Krämer; Denis Matringe; John Nawas; Everett Rowson (eds.). The Encyclopedia of Islam, THREE. BRILL Online.
- Crone, Patricia (2012). The Nativist Prophets of Early Islamic Iran: Rural Revolt and Local Zoroastrianism. Cambridge University Press. pp. 1–543. ISBN 9781139510769.
- Crone, Patricia (2011). "Ḵorramis". Encyclopaedia Iranica.
- Bosworth, C. E. (1987). "Azerbaijan iv. Islamic History to 1941". Encyclopaedia Iranica, Vol. III, Fasc. 2-3. pp. 224–231.
