= Babak Khorramdin =

9th-century Iranian revolutionary leader

- Persian: بابک خرمدین
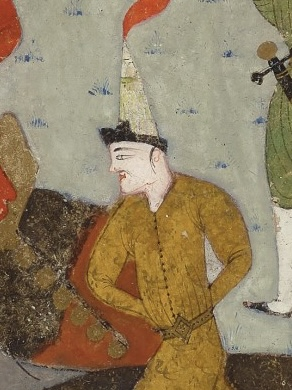
- Babak upon the elephant, into Samarra. Persian miniature created in 16th-century Safavid Iran, from a copy of Abu Ali Bal'ami's 10th-century Tarikhnama.
- Born: 795 or 798; Ardabil, Abbasid Caliphate (present-day Iran)
- Died: probably 7 January 838 (age 40 or 43); Samarra, Abbasid Caliphate (present-day Iraq)
- Known for: Leader of the Khorram-Dinān
- Opponent: Abbasid Caliphate
- Spouse: Banu

Bābak Khorramdin (Persian: بابک خرمدین, romanized: Bābak-e Khorramdīn; 795 or 798 – January 838) was one of the main Iranian revolutionary leaders of the Iranian Khorram-Dinān ("Those of the joyous religion"), which was a local rebellion against the Abbasid Caliphate. Khorramdin appears to be a compound analogous to durustdin "orthodoxy" and Behdin "Good Religion" (Zoroastrianism), and are considered an offshoot of neo-Mazdakism. Babak's Iranianizing rebellion, from its base in Azerbaijan in northwestern Iran, called for a return of the political glories of the Iranian past. The Khorramdin rebellion of Babak spread to the western and central parts of Iran and lasted more than twenty years before it was defeated when Babak was betrayed. Babak's uprising showed the continuing strength of ancestral Iranian local feelings in the region.

== Etymology ==
Bābak (بابک) is a New Persian name meaning "father", which is derived from the Middle Persian Pāpak/Pābag (𐭯𐭠𐭯𐭪𐭩), a common name in pre-Islamic Iran and also the name of one of the ancestors of the Sasanian dynasty, whose founder Ardashir I (r. 224–242) was the son of a prince named Pabag. Babak's original name was al-Hasan and he probably adopted the name Babak near the beginning of his rebellion.

== Background ==
Map of Azerbaijan in the 9th century.

Babak was born in 795 (or 798) in Bilalabad in the Mimadh district of the Ardabil area, which was part of Azerbaijan, a region in north-western Iran. The Mimadh district had provided the Sasanian marzban ("margrave") of Ardabil with troops during the Muslim conquest of Iran in 633–654, which resulted in the fall of the Sasanians and the conquest of Azerbaijan. The region was briefly occupied by the Khazars in 730–731 and had been controlled by the Arab Rawadid clan since the mid-8th century. Azerbaijan was populated by an Iranian people known as the Adhari, who were closely related to but distinct from the Persians. They spoke Adhari, an Iranian language.

Babak was most likely not of pure Persian extraction, and his native language may have been Adhari. His mother Mahru (whose name means "(a) beauty") was a non-Muslim wet-nurse from Azerbaijan. She is described as being "one-eyed" in Muslim sources and furthermore, by al-Tabari, as having become pregnant with her son after being raped by a mercenary. However, these stories are likely fabrications created by hostile authors in order to disgrace Babak. As for the identity of Babak's father, there are also multiple conflicting accounts. Al-Waqidi, as quoted by Ibn al-Nadim, states that he was an oil-seller from al-Mada'in (Ctesiphon) who had settled in Azerbaijan. Dinawari, who wrote his history in the late 9th century, states that there is ample evidence to support that his father's true name was Mutahhar and that he was a descendant of Abu Muslim, the Persian leader of the Abbasid revolution, through his daughter, Fatima. C. E. Bosworth argues that more credence should be lent to this latter account, as other sources are hostile and are eager to propose lowly or otherwise less honorable origins for Babak. Gholamhoseyn Yusofi writes that there is no way to know whether the report of Babak's descent from Abu Muslim is true, a fiction created by Babak to gain supporters, or a later invention. In the other sources, Babak's father's name is variably given as Abdallah, Amir ibn Abdallah, or Amir ibn Ahad, all of which suggest that he was a Muslim. Al-Tabari calls Babak's father Matar, while al-Sam'ani calls him Mirdas. This latter name has been interpreted by some as "man-eater" and is also the name of the father of the legendary villain Zahhak; it may be associated with Babak's reputation in the sources as a bloodthirsty person.

Babak's original faith is uncertain; he was born with the Muslim name of al-Hasan, and his three brothers, Mu'awiya, Abdallah, and Ishaq, also had Muslim names. According to Crone, non-Muslims could adopt Muslim names without becoming Muslims, but this was typically the practice of non-Muslim elites "who needed to move freely in Muslim society". Since Babak's parents were probably no more than landless villagers (per Crone, following al-Waqidi), this was likely not their reason for giving their sons Muslim names. Rather, they knew that "the future of their children lay with the Arab warlords [of Azerbaijan], and so brought them up to think of themselves as Muslims."

== Early life ==
During Babak's youth, his travelling father was killed near Sabalan. Until the age of twelve, Babak worked as a cowherd, and afterwards entered the service of an Arab warlord named Shibl ibn al-Muthanna al-Azdi in Sarab, where he worked as a groom and servant. The ghilman ("slaves") of Shibl taught Babak how to play the lute. Babak also learned to recite poetry, probably in the local Adhari dialect. According to the 11th-century writer Abu'l Ma'ali, Babak played the lute and sang songs for the locals whilst working as a fruit vendor in the village. Babak later established himself in the city of Tabriz. There he worked under another Arab warlord, Muhammad ibn Rawwad Azdi for two years, until he reached adulthood and left for his village, Bilalabad. There Babak encountered a wealthy and influential landlord named Javidhan, who was reportedly impressed with the latters cleverness, and as result recruited him into his service. Unlike the previous men Babak had served, Javidhan was a local Iranian, and the leader of one of the two Khurramite movements in Azerbaijan. The leader of the other Khurramite movement was a certain Abu Imran, who often clashed with Javidhans forces. During one of the clashes, Abu Imran was defeated and killed, whilst Javidhan was mortally wounded, dying three days later. Javidhan was succeeded by Babak, who had already converted to Khurramism under the latters service. It was most probably during this period that Babak changed his name from al-Hasan to Babak.

== Movement ==
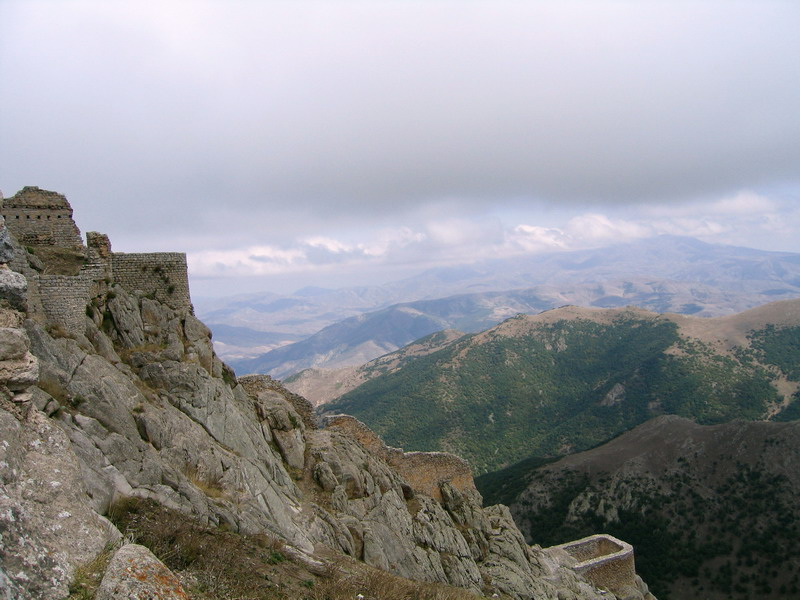
View of the landscape from the castle.

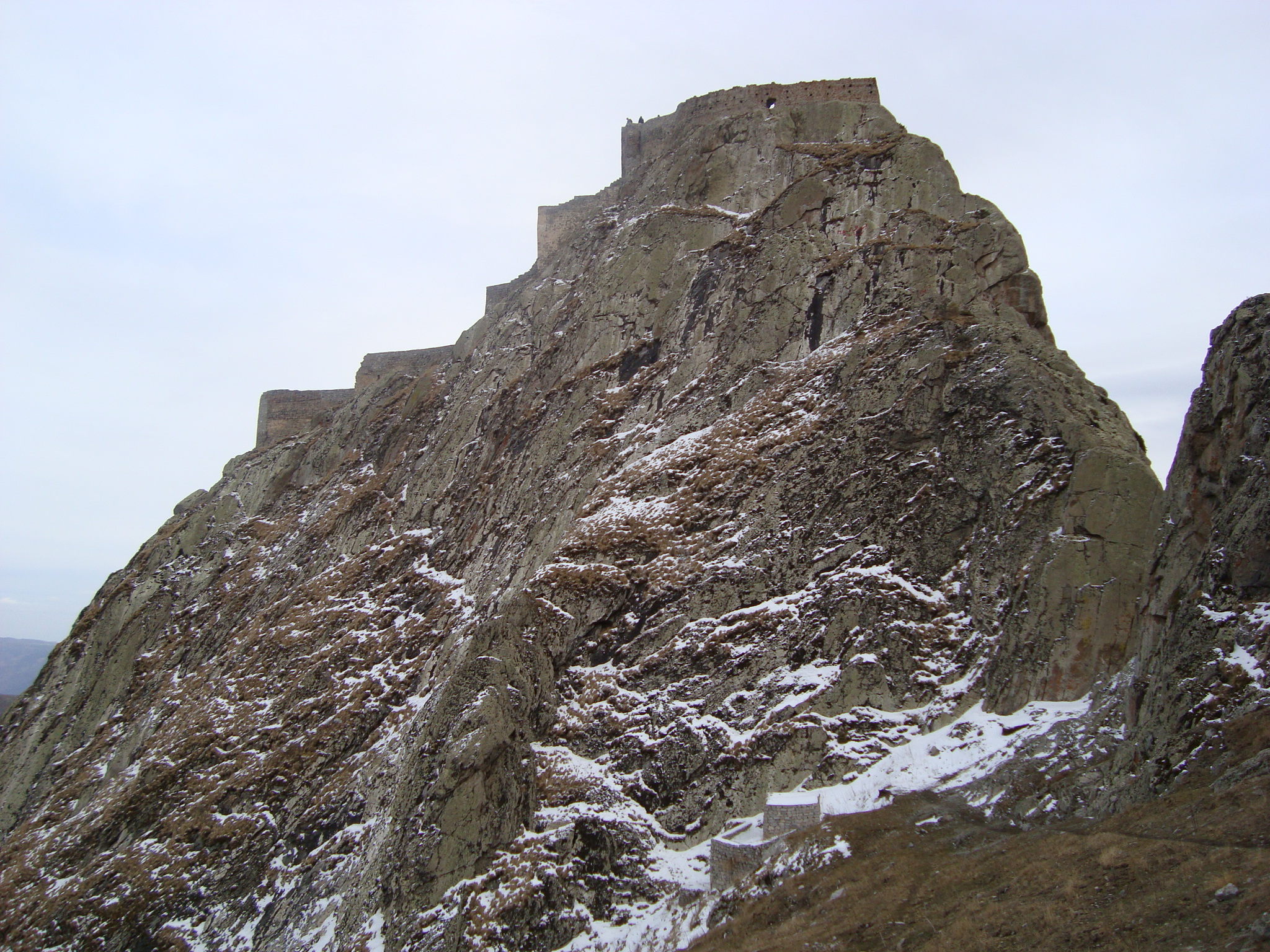
Babak Castle

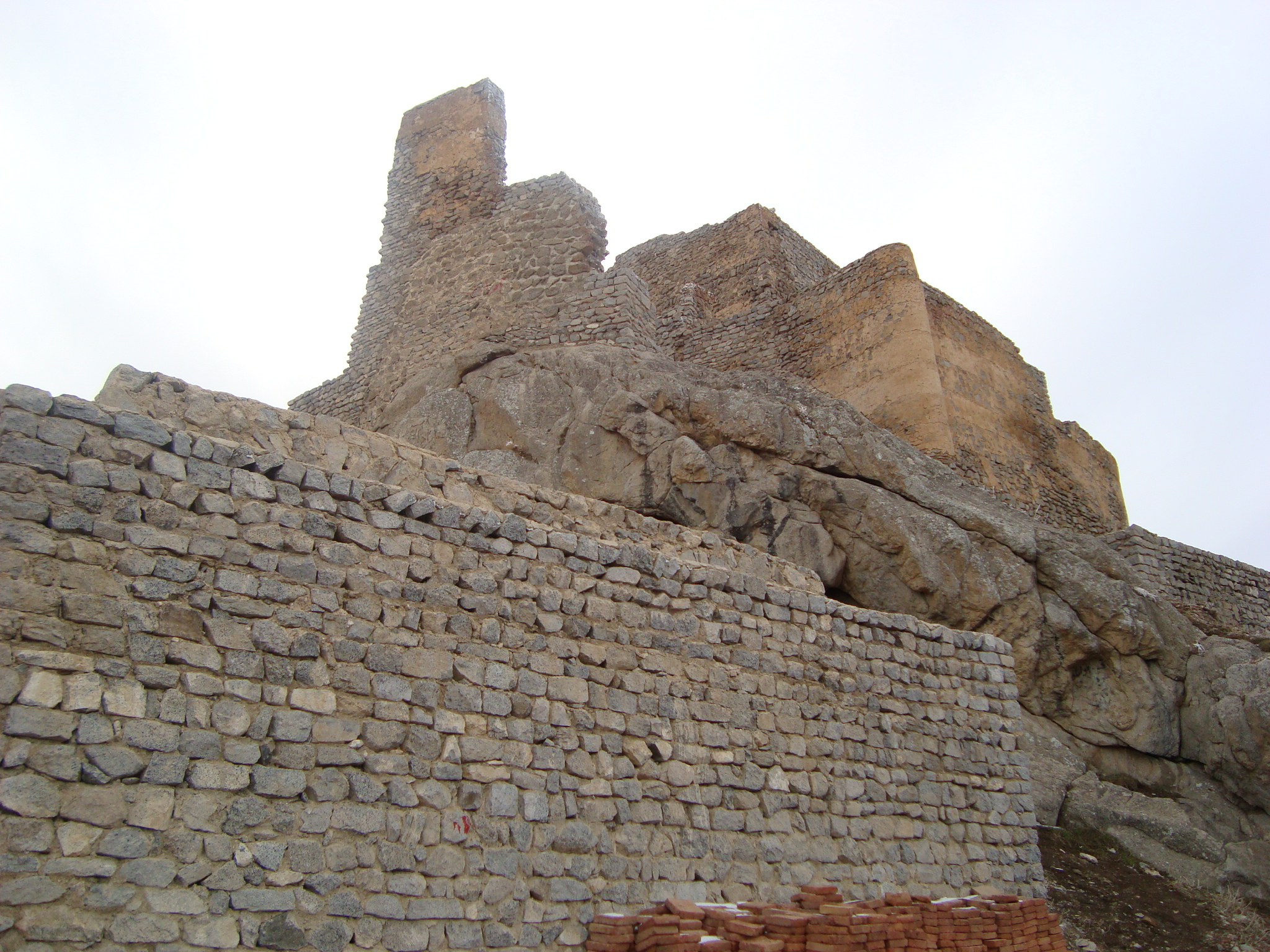
Babak Castle

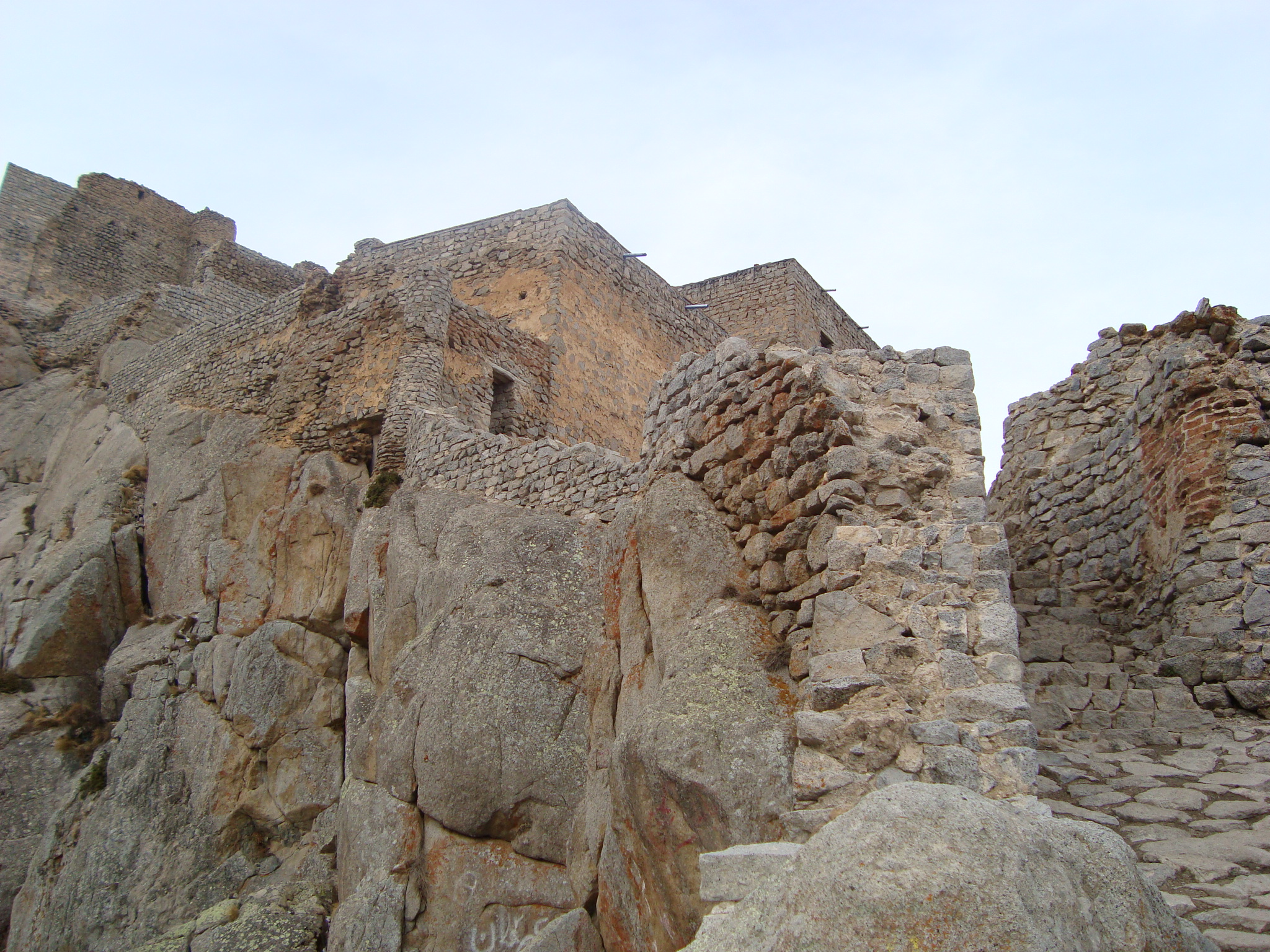
Babak Castle

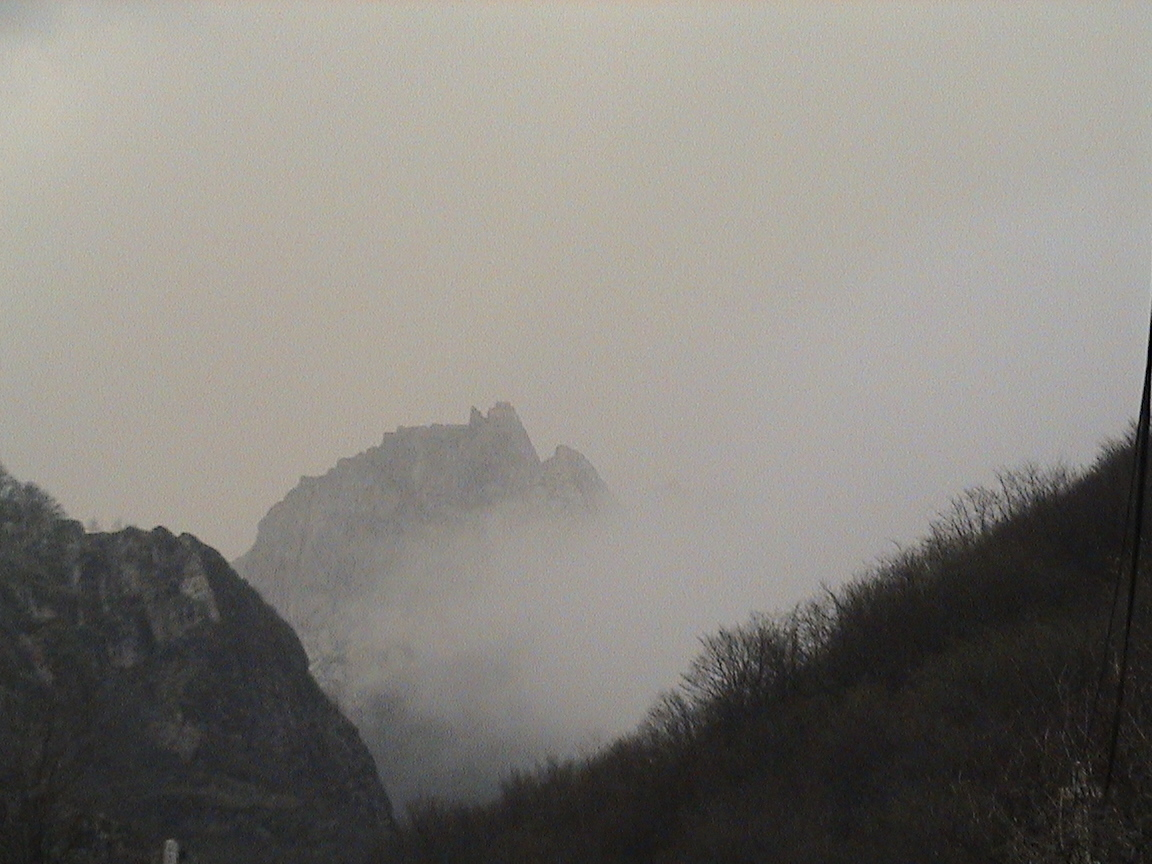
The castle could be seen at the peak between fog.

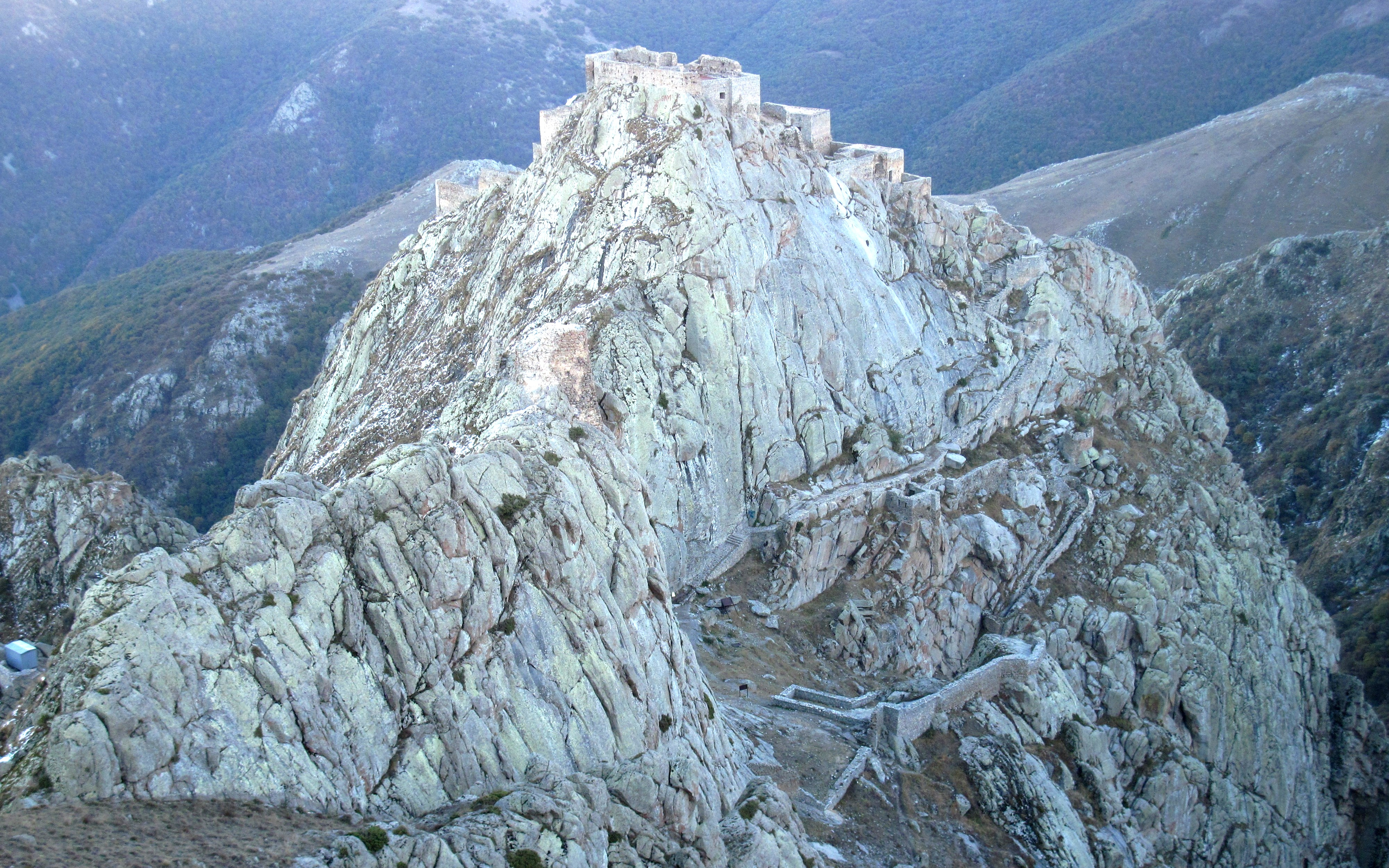
The castle from the camp.

In 755, Abu Muslim was murdered. Although he had helped the Abbasids to defeat the former Caliphs, the Umayyad dynasty, the ruling Caliph had given the order to kill him, probably because of his increasing popularity among Iranians and non-Muslims. This incident led to many revolts, mostly by angry Khurramiyyah (Khorram-Dinān) and some Zoroastrians. This, in turn, forced the Caliphs to use more violence against the Iranian population in order to keep the eastern provinces under control. The constant revolts did not come to an end in the following decades, and the Iranian population of the Caliphate was constantly being oppressed.

Babak joined the Khurramiyyah (Khorram-Dinān). The story of joining the Khorrami movement is being told in Waqed's account, in summary, as follows:

Two rich men named Javidhan b. Shahrak (or Shahrak) and Abu 'Emran were then living in the highland around the mountain of Badd and contending for the leadership of the highland's Khorrami inhabitants. Javidhan, when stuck in the snow on his way back from Zanjān to Badd, had to seek shelter at Balalabad and happened to go into the house of Babak's mother. Being poor, she could only light a fire for him, while Babak looked after the guest's servants and horses and brought water for them. Javidhan then sent Babak to buy food, wine, and fodder. When Babak came back and spoke to Javidhan, he impressed Javidhan with his shrewdness despite his lack of fluency of speech. Javidhan therefore asked the woman for permission to take her son away to manage his farms and properties, and offered to send her fifty dirhams a month from Babak's salary. The woman accepted and let Babak go.

Under the direction of his mentor Javidhan, a leader of one of the sects of the Khorramdin, Babak's knowledge of history, geography, and the latest battle tactics strengthened his position as a favorite candidate for commander during the early wars against the Arab occupiers.

Babak was a highly spiritual person who respected his Zoroastrian heritage. He made every possible effort to bring Iranians together and also with leaders such as Maziar to form a united front against the Arab Caliph. According to the medieval historian, Ibn Isfandyar, who composed the book Tarikh-e Tabaristan (History of Tabaristan), Maziar said:

I (Maziyar) and Babak had made an oath and allegiance that we re-take the government back from the Arabs and transfer the government and the country back to the family of the Khosrows (Sasanians).

However, one of the most dramatic periods in the history of Iran was set under Babak's leadership between 816–837. During these most crucial years, they not only fought against the Caliphate, but also for the preservation of Persian language and culture.

After the death of Javidhan, Babak married Javidhan's wife and became the Khorramis' leader, sometime in the year 816–17 during al-Ma'mun's reign. Babak incited his followers to rebel against the caliphate.

According to Vladimir Minorsky, around the 9th–10th century:

The original sedentary population of Azarbayjan consisted of a mass of peasants and at the time of the Arab conquest was compromised under the semi-contemptuous term of Uluj ("non-Arab") – somewhat similar to the raya (*raʿiyya) of the Ottoman empire. The only arms of this peaceful rustic population were slings, see Tabari, II, 1379–89. They spoke a number of dialects (Adhari (Old Azeri language), Talishi) of which even now there remains some islets surviving amidst the Turkish speaking population. It was this basic population on which Babak leaned in his revolt against the caliphate.

At that time of Babak, there were Khorramis scattered in many regions of Iran, besides Adharbayjan, reportedly in Tabarestan, Khorasan, Balkh, Isfahan, Kashan, Qom, Ray, Karaj, Hamadan, Lorestan, Khuzestan as well as in Basra, and Armenia.

Tabari records that Babak claimed he possessed Javadan's spirit and that Babak became active in 816–817. In 819–820 Yahya ibn Mu'adh fought against Babak, but could not defeat him. Two years later Babak vanquished the forces of Isa ibn Muhammad ibn Abi Khalid. In 824–825 the caliphal general Ahmad ibn al Junayd was sent against Babak. Babak defeated and captured him.

In 827–828 Muhammad ibn Humayd Tusi was dispatched to fight Babak. He won a victory and sent some captured enemies, but not Babak, to al-Ma'mun. However, about two years later, on June 9, 829, Babak won a decisive victory over this general at Hashtadsar. Muhammad ibn Humayd lost his life. Many of his soldiers were killed. The survivors fled in disarray.

Babak's victories over Arab generals were associated with his possession of Babak Castle on Badd, an inaccessible mountain stronghold according to the Arab historians who mentioned that his influence also extended even to the territories of today's Azerbaijan – "southward to near Ardabil and Marand, eastward to the Caspian Sea and the Shamakhi district and Shervan, northward to the Muqan (Moḡan) steppe and the Aras river bank, westward to the districts of Jolfa, Nakjavan, and Marand".

In 835–836 the caliph al-Mu'tasim sent his outstanding general Afshin against Babak. Afshin rebuilt fortresses. He employed a relay system to protect supply caravans. Babak tried to capture the money being sent to pay Afshin's army but was himself surprised, lost many men and barely escaped. He did succeed in capturing some supplies and inflicting some hardship on his enemies. Amongst Babak's commanders, various names have been mentioned including Azin, Rostam, Tarkhan, Mua’wiyah and Abdullah.

The next year Babak routed the forces of Afshin's subordinate, Bugha al-Kabir. In 837–838 al-Mu'tasim reinforced Afshin and provided him clear military instructions. Patiently following these enabled Afshin to capture Babak's stronghold of Babak Castle. Babak escaped. Al-Mu'tasim sent a safety guarantee for Babak to Afshin. This was taken to Babak who was very displeased. He said: "Better to live for just a single day as a ruler than to live for forty years as an abject slave."

He decided to leave the country for the Byzantine Empire and on his way Babak met Sahl Smbatean (Sahl ibn Sunbat in Arab sources), Prince of Khachen, who was Armenian. Sahl Smbatean, however, handed Babak over to Afshin in return for a large reward. Al-Mu'tasim commanded his general to bring Babak to him. Afshin informed Babak of this and told him since Babak might never return, this was the time to take a last look around. At Babak's request, Afshin allowed his prisoner to go to Badhdh. There Babak walked through his ruined stronghold one night until dawn.

Eventually, Babak, his wife, and his warriors were forced to leave Ghaleye Babak after 23 years of constant campaigns.

== Death ==
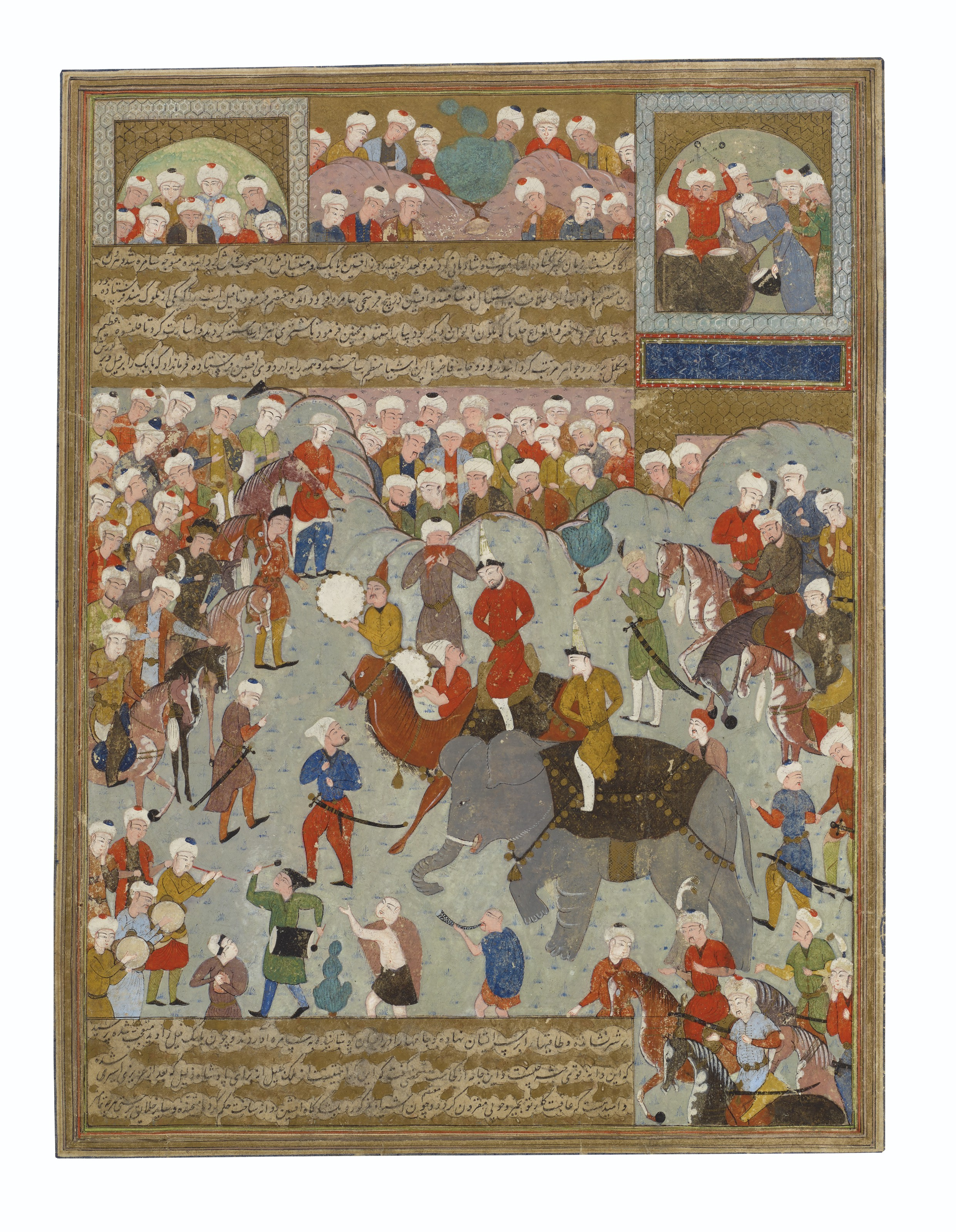
Afshin, upon the camel, parades Babak, upon the elephant, into Samarra. Persian miniature created in 16th-century Safavid Iran, from a copy of Abu Ali Bal'ami's 10th-century Tarikhnama

He was eventually seized by Khaydhar ibn Kawus al-Afshin and was handed over to the Abbasid Caliph. During Babak's execution, the Caliph's henchmen first cut off his legs and hands in order to convey the most devastating message to his followers. It is said that Babak bravely rinsed his face with the drained blood pouring out of his cuts, thus preventing the Caliph and the rest of the Abbasid army from seeing his pale face, a result of the heavy loss of blood. He was then gibbeted alive whilst sewn into a cow's skin with the horns at ear level to gradually crush his head as it dried out.

== Legacy ==
Babak Khorramdin was not well known outside academia until the 20th century; however, due to Soviet nation-building efforts and Babak's following of the teachings of Mazdak with its proto-socialist themes, Babak Khorramdin was proclaimed a national hero in the Azerbaijan Soviet Socialist Republic. For example, the Soviet-era scholar Ziya Bunyadov claimed that "Babak was a national hero of Azerbaijani people" while the Russian ethnologist, historian and anthropologist Victor Schnirelmann dismisses Bunyadov's theory, criticizing Bunyadov for not mentioning that Babak spoke Persian, and ignoring the witness accounts of Babak's contemporaries who call him Persian. To this day, in the modern Republic of Azerbaijan, Babak is a cult figure and celebrated as a national hero. A city and a district in Azerbaijan were named after Babak, and a popular Azerbaijani film was released in 1979 about his life.

In modern Iran, due to the rise of nationalism in the 20th century, and renewed interest in pre-Islamic Iran, Babak Khorramdin was rediscovered during the reign of Reza Shah, and is celebrated as a national hero. However, Babak remains a controversial figure in the Islamic Republic, whose idolization is criticized by some Shia clerics.

== Sources ==
- Bahramian, Ali; Hirtenstein, Stephen; Gholami, Rahim (2013). "Bābak Khurram-Dīn". In Madelung, Wilferd; Daftary, Farhad (eds.). Encyclopaedia Islamica Online. Brill Online. ISSN 1875-9831.
- Bosworth, C. E. (1987). "Azerbaijan iv. Islamic History to 1941". Encyclopaedia Iranica. Vol. III, Fasc. 2–3. pp. 224–231.
- Crone, Patricia (2011a). "Bābak". In Fleet, Kate; Krämer, Gudrun; Matringe, Denis; Nawas, John; Rowson, Everett (eds.). Encyclopaedia of Islam (3rd ed.). Brill Online. ISSN 1873-9830.
- Crone, Patricia (2011b). "Ḵorramis". In Yarshater, Ehsan (ed.). Encyclopædia Iranica. London and New York: Routledge & Kegan Paul.
- Crone, Patricia (2012). The Nativist Prophets of Early Islamic Iran: Rural Revolt and Local Zoroastrianism. Cambridge University Press. pp. 1–543. ISBN 978-1-139-51076-9.
- Frye, R. N. (1988). "Bābak (1)". In Yarshater, Ehsan (ed.). Encyclopædia Iranica. Vol. III/3: Azerbaijan IV–Bačča(-ye) Saqqā (Online ed.). Encyclopædia Iranica Foundation. pp. 298–299.
- Sourdel, D (1986). "Bābak". Encyclopaedia of Islam. Vol. 1 (2nd ed.). Leiden: E.J. Brill. p. 844. ISBN 90-04-08114-3.
- Tabari (1991). The History of al-Ṭabarī, Volume XXXIII: Storm and Stress along the Northern Frontiers of the ʽAbbāsid Caliphate. Translated and annotated by C. E. Bosworth. Albany: State University of New York Press.
- Yarshater, E. (1988). "Azerbaijan vii. The Iranian Language of Azerbaijan". In Yarshater, Ehsan (ed.). Encyclopædia Iranica. Vol. III/3: Azerbaijan IV–Bačča(-ye) Saqqā (Online ed.). Encyclopædia Iranica Foundation. pp. 238–245.
- Yusofi, Gh. -H. (1988). "Bābak Ḵorramī". In Yarshater, Ehsan (ed.). Encyclopædia Iranica. Vol. III/3: Azerbaijan IV–Bačča(-ye) Saqqā (Online ed.). Encyclopædia Iranica Foundation. pp. 299–306.
