= Abū Sa'īd's invasions of Asia Minor =

Military campaigns, 839–841

Abū Sa‘īd's invasions of Asia Minor
- Part of the Arab-Byzantine wars
- Map of Byzantine Asia Minor and the Byzantine-Arab frontier c. 780
Date	839–841
Location	Asia minor, Cilicia, Melitene
Result	Byzantine victory Full results: 839 invasion: Abbasid victory; 840 invasion: Byzantine victory; 841 invasion: Byzantine victory; 841 Counterinvasion: Byzantine victory

Belligerents
Byzantine Empire	Abbasid Caliphate: Emirate of Tarsus; Emirate of Melitene

Commanders and leaders
Theophilos Nasr †	Al-Mu'tasim Abū Sa‘īd; Bashīr

Strength
Khurramite Persians; Thematic forces from Cappadocia and the turmae of Charsianon and Seleucia	Forces from Syria, Al-Jazira, Cilicia and Melitene

Casualties and losses
Heavy	Heavy

Abū Sa‘īd's invasions of Asia Minor were a series of expeditions conducted by the Abbasid Caliphate against the Byzantine Empire in the later years of Caliph Al-Mu'tasim's and Theophilos' reigns. The Byzantines, still reeling from their major military defeat by the Abbasids in 838, were initially worsted by a further invasion led by Governor Abū Sa‘īd in 839. However, aided by the effective reorganization of the thematic military structures by Theophilos, the Byzantines managed to repulse the two subsequent invasions of Abū Sa‘īd in 840 and 841. Following these successes, the Byzantines conducted a successful counteroffensive into Abbasid territory.

== Background – Theophilos' military reforms ==
The reign of Emperor Theophilos had seen constant warfare against the Abbasids in the East. Though Theophilos had won notable successes campaigning in 831 and 837, celebrating triumphs on both occasions, these successes had also been tempered by defeats. The most disastrous year of Theophilos' reign had been 838, wherein the emperor's field army had been defeated in battle by the Abbasids, and the city of Amorium, from which the ruling dynasty hailed, had been sacked by an army led by Caliph Al-Mu'tasim in person.

In response to these disasters, Theophilos embarked on a project of military reform. After settling terms of a return to Byzantine service with the former Khurramite Persian troops, who had rebelled in 839 under Theophobos, the emperor integrated these auxiliaries as regular thematic troops, drawing men from their ranks to reinforce each of the seven Anatolian themes, as well as Macedonia and Thrace. Further detachments of 2,000 cavalrymen reinforced the turmae of Seleucia and Cappadocia in the Anatolikon, as well as Charsianon in the Armeniakon. Furthermore, Theophilos had instituted organizational changes to the troops of the themes, while splitting each Droungos (previously the smallest unit division, consisting of 1,000 men per piece) into five Banda of 200 men apiece, which consisted of 50 horsemen and 150 infantrymen. He also assigned an officer called a "Count" to command each of the bandas. To ensure the effectiveness of the reformed Byzantine military apparatus, Theophilos increased the pay of the soldiers, raising the salary from the previously arranged 5 nomismata to an average of 9 nomismata by 840, which in turn allowed the men to secure themselves equipment of superior quality while restoring their morale after the disasters of 838.

Meanwhile, the Abbasids had temporarily been occupied by the abuses of Minkajūr, governor of Azerbaijan. When Al-Mutasim became aware of Minkajūr's extortionate practices and deception, he ordered the governor imprisoned. Minkajūr then accused his uncle, Afshin, victor of the Battle of Anzen the previous year, of driving him to rebel against the Caliph, which led to the execution of Minkajūr and the removal of the veteran general Afshin from his post in Jibal. Nevertheless, the Abbasids had not been idle in the conflict with Byzantium. Al-Mutasim had appointed Abū Sa‘īd to a special command as governor of both Syria and Al-Jazira. From his new command, Abū Sa‘īd planned major raids into Asia Minor to maintain the strategic pressure against Byzantium in the wake of the Abbasid successes of 838.

== Invasion of 839 ==
Abū Sa‘īd conducted his first invasion into Byzantine territory in 839. According to Michael the Syrian, in this invasion Abū Sa‘īd was accompanied by another general named Bashīr. The two Abbasid commanders led two separate columns, one under Abū Sa‘īd's command consisting of units from Syria and Al-Jazira, and the other commanded by Bashīr, who led the troops of Cilicia. The Abbasid commanders directed their invasion into Cappadocia.

Bashīr's army raided far, taking significant quantities of loot and many captives. He was then stopped by a Byzantine army (composed primarily of former Khurramite Persian troops) led by the Persian Nasr, (Note: Treadgold (1988, p.321) identifies Nasr with Theophobos. However, Codoñer (p.153-164) reasons that these were to separate people as The Continuator refers to Theophobos being born and raised in Constantinople. However, Nasr may have been Theophobos' father.) who managed to defeat Bashīr, rescue the captives and retrieve the loot he had taken. However, Nasr was subsequently forced to fight a battle near the fort of Acarcus against the second Abbasid army under Abū Sa‘īd, who had come to the aid of his subordinate. In this second battle, Nasr's men were heavily outnumbered, but fought a last stand against the Abbasids. Nasr and his men were all ultimately killed by the Arabs, who, following their hard-fought victory, cut off and salted their heads, before dispatching them to the Caliph, who rejoiced at the death of Nasr (as he had been responsible for the devastation of Sozopetra in 837). He rewarded Bashīr with gifts and a gold necklace bearing his image.

Although the Byzantines had been worsted in this campaign, the heavy losses inflicted upon the enemy, particularly Bashīr's army, prevented any further raids by the Abbasids in 839. Furthermore, the Byzantines made strategic gains in the Eastern Mediterranean later in 839, where a retaliatory operation by the imperial fleet attacked and sacked the Abbasid port of Seleucia Pieria, likely in the autumn.

== Invasion of 840 ==
By the spring of 840, Abū Sa‘īd had recouped his losses and was ready to launch a second offensive into Asia Minor. The Abbasids attacked Cappadocia again and initially gained success in collecting great amounts of loot and captives. The campaign appeared to have ended in success when the governor and his army crossed the Cilician Gates into Abbasid territory with the spoils collected. However, the Byzantine thematic leadership had assembled a powerful army, likely consisting of troops drawn from Cappadocia, Charsianon, and Seleucia. These forces tailed Abū Sa‘īd through the Gates into Cilicia and caught and defeated his army there. As a result of this victory, the Byzantines were able to recover the captives and plunder the Arabs had taken in their raid that year, reversing Abū Sa‘īd's gains of the campaign.

== Invasions of 841 ==
=== Abū Sa‘īd's third offensive ===
Keen to erase the humiliation of his defeat in Cilicia, Abū Sa‘īd organized a third invasion of Asia Minor, which came in 841. (Note: The dating of Abū Sa‘īd's invasions, which are recorded in brief passages in Michael the Syrian's work and are described in the same passage, is a source of uncertainty for modern scholars. Treadgold (1997, p. 600) dates the defeat of Nasir to 840 and both of Abū's failed expeditions to the year 841, with the Byzantine victory in Cilicia taking place in the spring and the victory in Cappadocia in the summer. Codoñer (pp. 330-332) proposes that the defeat of Nasir may have taken place in 839 and that the two Byzantine victories over Abū Sa‘īd took place on different occasions between 840 & 841 despite being recorded immediately following one another by Michael.) This time, the Abbasids advanced into Anatolia from the direction of the Emirate of Melitene, targeting the territory of Charsianon. The thematic army opposed the Abbasid invasion before it could conduct widespread raiding operations, intercepting Abū Sa‘īd soon after he had crossed the Melitene Pass. The Byzantines inflicted a further defeat upon the Abbasids, forcing Abū Sa‘īd's remaining troops to retreat in disorder back to Melitene.

=== Byzantine counteroffensive ===
The Byzantine operations in 841 did not stop with the repulsion of the Abū Sa‘īd's invasion. Exploiting their victory, they pursued the Arabs through the Melitene Pass, into Abbasid territory of the Al-Awasim. The thematic forces devastated the region of Melitene. With the rout of Abū Sa‘īd and the disintegration of his army, Abbasid defences in the region appear to have been in a state of disarray at the time of this offensive. With the Arabs caught unprepared by the surprise invasion, the Byzantine army captured and sacked the fortified strongholds of Adata and Germanikeia. Content with their success, the Byzantines did not try to occupy these cities and returned to Anatolia with massive amounts of loot and captives. The magnitude of this success was particularly notable as it was comparable to Theophilos' victory in 837, but had been achieved without the involvement of the Emperor, and possibly even without tagmatic units in the Byzantine army.

== Result ==
Following the Byzantine attack on Melitene, a diplomatic exchange was opened between Al-Mu'tasim and Theophilos. Theophilos dispatched gifts to Baghdad, seeking an exchange of prisoners taken by the Abbasids in 838 and those collected by the Byzantines in 841. Though Al-Mu'tasim received the gifts and sent gifts to Theophilos in return, he refused the exchange offer on the grounds that Muslims were of greater value than Christians. Professor Juan Signes Codoñer reasons that the Caliph was careful not to accede to Byzantine terms of peace by granting the exchange, as this would have been humiliating in light of the recent Byzantine military successes. Nevertheless, according to Michael the Syrian, the negotiations eventually led to a truce between the empire and the caliphate. However, both Theophilos and Al-Mu'tasim died soon after in January 842.

The defense against Abū Sa‘īd has been considered an indicator of Byzantine military resilience and revitalization. Along with a major victory by Thracesian units over an amphibious invasion by the Cretan Arabs in 841, the successes in the east led historian Warren Treadgold to note an increased effectiveness of Byzantine thematic organization following Theophilos' military reforms. The Abbasid successes of 838 had not decisively crippled the Byzantine defensive apparatus, and as demonstrated in 841, had not deterred them from conducting offensives across the Thughur and capturing major Abbasid settlements. The Byzantine victory in 841 did not lead to retaliation by the Abbasids during the final years of Theophilos' reign in the manner the sack of Sozopetra had, with the two sides negotiating a peace settlement at this time. Thus, Codoñer has remarked on Theophilos' effective leadership that he "succeeded in redressing the situation caused by the sack of Amorion in just a couple of years"

== Bibliography ==
- Signes Codoñer, Juan (2016). The Emperor Theophilos and the East, 829–842: Court and Frontier in Byzantium During the Last Phase of Iconoclasm. Taylor and Francis. pp. 20–21. ISBN 9781317034278.
- Treadgold, Warren (1988). The Byzantine Revival, 780–842. Stanford University Press.
- Treadgold, Warren (1997). A History of the Byzantine State and Society. Stanford, California: Stanford University Press. ISBN 978-0804779371.
- Vasiliev, Alexander A. (1935). Byzance et les Arabes, Tome I: La dynastie d'Amorium (820–867). Corpus Bruxellense Historiae Byzantinae (in French). Vol. 1. French ed.: Henri Grégoire, Marius Canard. Brussels: Éditions de l'Institut de philologie et d'histoire orientales.
