= Siege of Cefalù (837–838) =

- Part of the Muslim conquest of Sicily; Arab–Byzantine wars
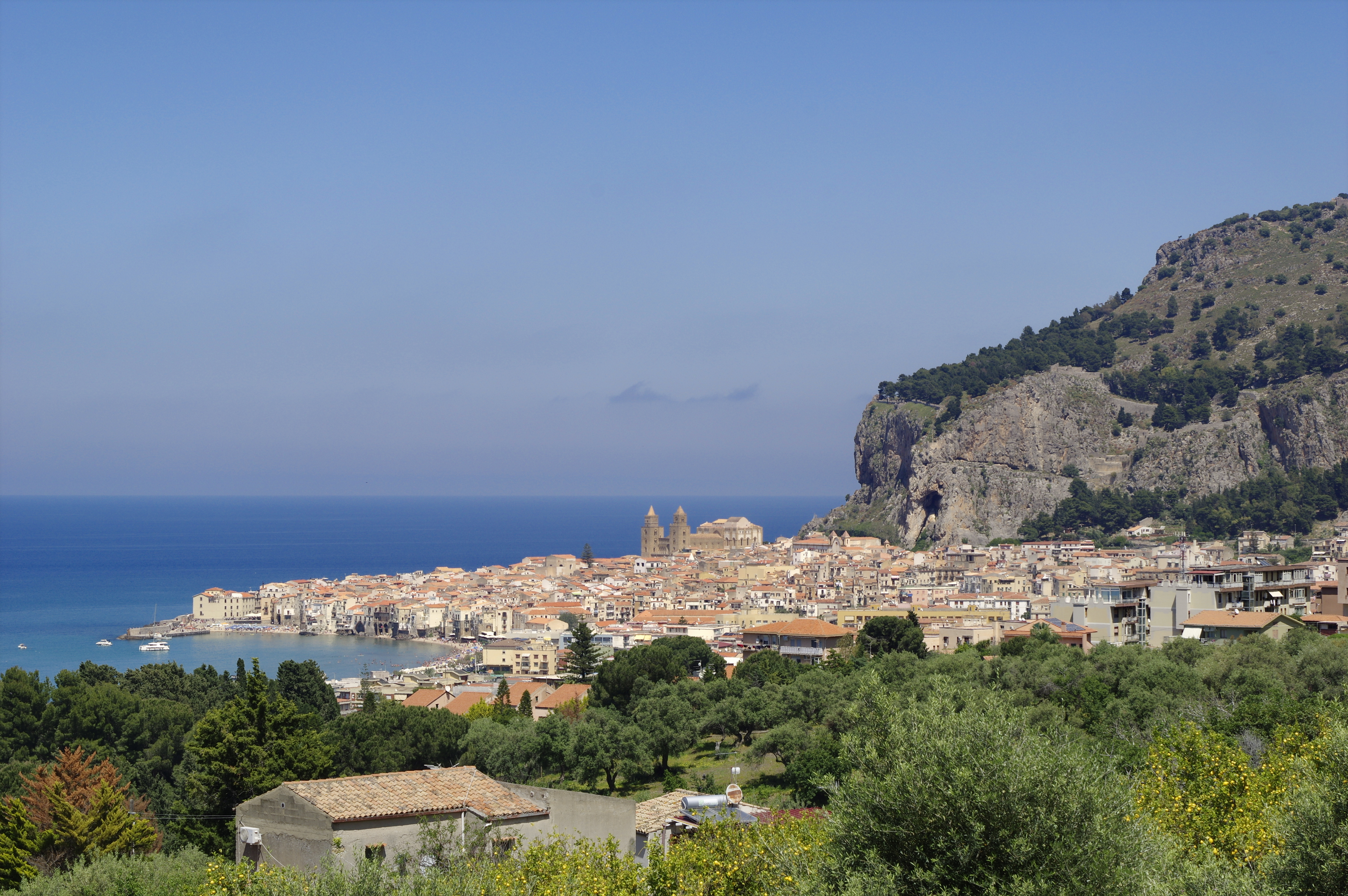
- Modern view of Cefalù and the Northern Sicilian Coast
| Date | December 837 – Spring 838 |
| Location | Cefalù, Sicily 38.037°N 14.027°E |
| Result | Byzantine victory |

Belligerents
| Aghlabid dynasty | Byzantine Empire |

Commanders and leaders
| Unknown | Alexios Mosele |

Strength
| Unknown | Unknown |

The Siege of Cefalù or Siege of Kephaloidion was undertaken by the forces of the Aghlabids against the Byzantine city of Cefalù. The siege was conducted over a prolonged period from late 837 to spring 838, before a Byzantine relief force under the Caesar Alexios Mosele arrived and broke the siege, saving the city. This operation secured Cefalù and enabled the Byzantines under Alexios to launch a counteroffensive in Sicily.

== Background ==
In the middle 830s, Aghlabid momentum in their ongoing conquest of Sicily mounted once again, as Arab forces under Al-Fadhl ibn Ya'qub scored a victory over the Byzantines near Enna. However, military fortunes in that year had not been entirely favourable to the Aghlabids, who sustained severe maritime losses. The Aghlabid emir of Ifriqiya, Ziyadat Allah, had dispatched his cousin Abu'l-Aghlab Ibrahim, to take up his appointed position of governor of Sicily. However, during the journey from Tunis part of his fleet was sunk in a storm, while the Byzantine navy engaged and destroyed many other ships. (Note: During this naval engagement, the Byzantines captured Aghlabid fireships. This demonstrates that at this time, the Ifriqiyan Arab navy had made efforts to replicate Byzantine Greek fire technology for use by their own warships. A squadron of these warships under Muhammad ibn al-Sindi attempted to pursue the Byzantines following their destruction of part of the Aghlabid fleet, though they failed to retrieve the captured ships.) Abu'l-Aghlab himself, with a small remaining squadron, managed to reach Aghlabid-held Palermo, but most of his expedition had been lost in the crossing. In spite of these heavy losses, Abu'l-Aghlab soon renewed active operations in Sicily by leading a naval raid that captured a Byzantine ship near Pantelleria, while an Aghlabid cavalry force raided Eastern Sicily past Mount Etna, burning villages, crops, and taking captives. Abu'l-Aghlab, in revenge for the losses in the crossing, beheaded the prisoners taken in these operations.

== Siege and Alexios Mosele's campaign ==
In 837, Abu'l-Aghlab began mounting further operations to reduce the most formidable strongholds of Sicily, which included Cefalù and Enna. The Aghlabids managed to sack the lower town of Enna but could not take the citadel, and thus departed in return for a ransom from the inhabitants. Around the same time, the Aghlabids attacked Cefalù. The preliminary attempts to storm Cefalù were repulsed by the Byzantine garrison, prompting the Arabs to invest the city in a protracted siege. It was likely around late 837 that Emperor Theophilos dispatched an expeditionary force under Alexios Mosele to Sicily. This siege of Cefalù dragged on through the winter into the spring of 838, at which point the Caesar's arrival tipped the balance in favour of the Byzantines. The arrival of this sizeable body of reinforcements forced the Aghlabids to lift the siege and retreat into the interior of Eastern Sicily.

Having arrived in Sicily and broken the Siege of Cefalù, Alexios launched a wider offensive into the island during which he defeated the Aghlabids in multiple battles. One of these victories was achieved near Enna against an Aghlabid army under Abd al-Salam ibn Abd al-Wahhab, who was defeated and taken prisoner, with most of his men falling in the battle. (Note: Alexander Vasiliev dates this Byzantine victory to 837 and places it before Abu'l-Aghlab's siege of Enna, with that operation being a retaliation for al-Salam's defeat. However, Warren Treadgold dates the defeat of al-Salam to 838 and proposes this as one of the Caesar Alexios' victories in Sicily.) These successes were important in lifting Byzantine morale, as in the same year Theophilos had suffered a heavy defeat at the hands of the Abbasid Caliphate, which led to the Sack of Amorium. Along with the death of Emir Ziyadat Allah, Alexios' operations temporarily halted the Aghlabid advance in Sicily.

== Aftermath ==
Despite his successes in Sicily, a political rift began to develop between Alexios and Theophilos after the passing of the emperor's daughter Maria, who had been betrothed to the Caesar. A group of Sicilians who had arrived in Constantinople accused Alexios of conspiring with the Aghlabids, seeking their military support to help him usurp the emperor. (Note: Alexios Mosele may have suffered some sort of military reverse against the Aghlabids in 839, as ibn al-Athir records Arab successes following the arrival of reinforcements from Ifriqiya, dispatched by Ziyadat Allah I's brother and successor Abu Iqal al-Aghlab ibn Ibrahim. The Aghlabids are recorded to have conducted a successful raid from Palermo in 839 and to have captured the fortresses of Corleone, Platani, and Kamikos in 839–840. However, these Byzantine setbacks may have occurred following the departure of the Caesar.) Theophilos resolved to recall Alexios, but as he feared this could arouse the Caesar's suspicions and trigger a revolt, he dispatched the archbishop of Syracuse, Theodore Crithinus, to bring back Alexios under a pledge of immunity. The archbishop assured Alexios of safe conduct, but upon arrival Theophilos had Alexios beaten, imprisoned, and stripped of his rank on the charge of him being a rebel. When Theodore Crinthinus accused Theophilos of violating his vow of safe conduct to Alexios, the emperor also had him beaten and exiled. Although Theophilos eventually recalled Theodore and even released Alexios after clearing him of charges, restoring him to the position of Caesar, Alexios never returned to campaign in Sicily. In the years following his departure, military pressure from the Aghlabids mounted until the Arabs reached a milestone in their conquest of Sicily with the capture of Messina in 843.

== Bibliography ==
- Treadgold, Warren (1988). The Byzantine Revival, 780–842. Stanford University Press.
- Vasiliev, Alexander A. (1935). Byzance et les Arabes, Tome I: La dynastie d'Amorium (820–867). Corpus Bruxellense Historiae Byzantinae (in French). Vol. 1. French ed.: Henri Grégoire, Marius Canard. Brussels: Éditions de l'Institut de philologie et d'histoire orientales.
- Amari, Michele (1858). Storia dei musulmani di Sicilia [History of the Muslims of Sicily]. Vol. 2. Florence: Felice Le Monnier.
- Bury, John Bagnell (1912). A History of the Eastern Roman Empire from the Fall of Irene to the Accession of Basil I (A.D. 802–867). London: Macmillan and Co.
- Alex Metcalfe (2009). The Muslims of Medieval Italy (illustrated ed.). Edinburgh University Press. p. 142. ISBN 978-0-7486-2008-1.
- Michele Amari (1854). Storia dei musulmani di Sicilia. F. Le Monnier. p. 302 Vol III.
