= Siege of Sozopetra (837) =

- Part of the Arab–Byzantine wars
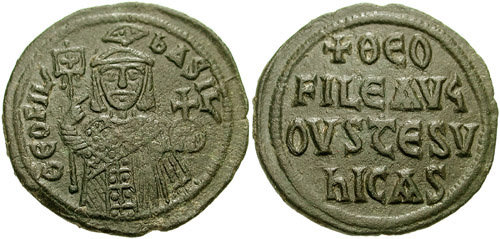
- Follis of Theophilos minted in large quantities in celebration of his successes against the Arabs after c. 835
Date	Summer of 837
Location	Sozopetra, modern Malatya, Turkey
Result	Byzantine victory: Sozopetra destroyed

Belligerents
Byzantine Empire	Abbasid Caliphate: Emirate of Melitene

Commanders and leaders
Theophilos; Theophobos; Manuel; Alexios Mosele	Unknown

Strength
Total: 100,000 men (exaggerated figure); 70,000 soldiers; 30,000 servants	Unknown garrison strength

Casualties and losses
Unknown	Entire garrison

The siege of Sozopetra was a military engagement between the Byzantine Empire and the Abbasid Caliphate. The Byzantines besieged the city of Sozopetra, in the territory of Melitene, and succeeded in sacking the city.

== Background ==
By 837, the Abbasid armies led by their general Afshin gained the upper hand against the forces of the Khurramite leader Babak in the South Caucasus, especially after the arrival of reinforcements dispatched by Caliph Al-Mu'tasim strengthened Afshin. Babak thought of a strategy of diverting Abbasid pressure by inciting the Byzantines against them. Consequently, he wrote a letter to Emperor Theophilos, informing him that the Caliph's forces were distracted and that the Byzantines would face little opposition from the Abbasids in a campaign at that time.

Theophilos had already campaigned against the Abbasids that decade, having attained a major victory in a pitched battle in 831 and celebrated a triumph, but he had also suffered a defeat in his attempt to relieve Loulon, which was captured in 832. From 832 to 836, the Byzantines campaigned with varying success, including an attack led by Theophilos into Armenia in 835 which forced Theodosiopolis to pay tribute to Byzantium. Seeking to exploit the opportunity in 837, Theophilos assembled an army from the themes of of the East, including tagmatic units under the Domestikos Manuel, along with Khuramite auxiliaries under Theophobos. According to Tabari, his army consisted of 100,000 men in total, with 70,000 soldiers and 30,000 servants. Historian Warren Treadgold considers this figure plausible, while Juan Codoñer considers it inflated. Nonetheless, Theophilos had assembled an exceptionally large army and led them into the territory of the Abbasid Emirate of Melitene.

== Siege ==
When the summer campaigning season begun, Theophilos and his army entered the district of Melitene, but the city itself was bypassed. The Byzantines instead advanced against the fortified settlement of Sozopetra and offered its garrison a passage of surrender. When the defenders refused, Theophilos' army stormed the city. The Byzantines mounted scaling ladders upon the walls and in a fierce fight, drove back the defending Abbasid troops. The city then fell to the imperial forces. Theophilos punished the residents harshly for their defiance. Though the Byzantines spared the Christians, all men among the captive Muslims were executed, while their women and children were taken prisoners. Theophilos' men also pillaged and burned much of the city. Michael the Syrian noted that some of the Khurramites auxiliaries went further in their brutality than Theophilos had ordered, raping and mutilating a number of female captives.

Following the fall of Sozopetra, the inhabitants of the nearby settlements either paid Theophilos tribute or fled to the south. Theophilos bivouacked eastwards and ravaged the territory of Melitene, taking many prisoners. The Byzantines then advanced against the city of Arsamosata and besieged it. In the panic following their defeat, the Muslims in the surrounding regions of the Abbasid Caliphate, such as Edessa began persecutions against the Christian Syriac communities, though these tentions were alleviated to some degree when news arrived that the Byzantine troops had also plundered Christian properties in Sozopetra. After campaign of 837 ended the Abbasids rebuilt the destroyed city. The fall of Sozopetra, and further defeats suffered by the Abbasids in the same year led to a response by the Caliph Al-Mutasim. Consequently, in 838 he assembled a major army and initiated a campaign that culminated in the sack of Amorium. In a later Byzantine-Abbasid prisoner exchange in Autumn 845, during the reign of Theophilos' son and successor Michael III, some of the surviving prisoners taken by the Byzantine army at Sozopetra were released.

== Bibliography ==
- Warren Treadgold (1988), The Byzantine revival, 780–842.
- Juan Signes Codoñer (2016). The Emperor Theophilos and the East, 829–842 Court and Frontier in Byzantium During the Last Phase of Iconoclasm. Taylor and Francis. pp. 20–21. ISBN 9781317034278.
- Vasiliev, Alexander A. (1935). Byzance et les Arabes, Tome I: La dynastie d'Amorium (820–867). Corpus Bruxellense Historiae Byzantinae (in French). Vol. 1. French ed.: Henri Grégoire, Marius Canard. Brussels: Éditions de l'Institut de philologie et d'histoire orientales.
