= Battle of Charsianon (831) =

- Part of the Arab–Byzantine wars
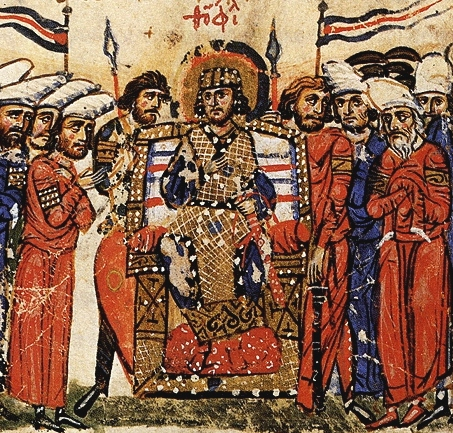
- Emperor Theophilos in the Chronicle of John Skylitzes
Date	831
Location	Charsianon, Cappadocia, modern day Turkey
Result	Byzantine victory

Belligerents
Byzantine Empire	Abbasid Caliphate: Emirate of Tarsus

Commanders and leaders
Theophilos; Eudokimos; Manuel the Armenian	Unknown

Strength
Unknown; possibly larger	Large army

Casualties and losses
Unknown	Many killed in the battle 1,600–2,000 killed in the Byzantine raid near Tarsus (Note: The 1,600 casualties figure was mentioned in Al-Tabari's account. Treadgold (p.275) identifies this figure with the casualties of Abbasid soldiers at the battle of Charsianon, but Vasiliev (p.104) and Codoner (p.224) interpret it as referring to the number of people killed by Theophilos' army while it raided near Tarsus); 20–25,000 captured (Note: Codoñer (pp.221-22) considers these figures too high as a count of captive soldiers, even after a major defeat of a large army during this period, as the number of killed usually exceeded the figure for captives and a significant part of a defeated army typically escapes. However, Codoñer reasons that these figures may be valid if they are taken to include both the captive Abbasid soldiers and civilians taken prisoner by the Byzantines during their invasion of Cilicia following the battle.)

The Battle of Charsianon was fought in 831 between an invading Abbasid army and an assembled Byzantine force, led by Theophilos, in Central Anatolia. The Abbasid army was defeated, with many killed and a significant number captured, allowing Theophilos to campaign into Cilicia and celebrate the first of two triumphs in his reign.

== Background ==
In 830 Caliph Al-Ma'mun campaigned in Byzantine Anatolia. The Abbasid armies divided into two columns, with Al-Ma'mun personally leading an army that took the fortress of Majida and then captured Corum, the headquarters of the Byzantine Theme of Cappadocia, according to Ibn Qutaybah. The second division under the Caliph's son, Al-Abbas, along with the Byzantine renegade Manuel the Armenian, entered Anatolia from the direction of Melitene and plundered the territory. However, Manuel betrayed Abbas during this campaign and defected back to the Byzantines, which may have also been accompanied by a military setback for Al-Abbas' division, which ultimately forced him to retreat from Byzantine territory through the pass of Hadath. These events may also have contributed to the withdrawal of Al-Mamun's main Abbasid division after its successes earlier in the campaign.

== Campaign and battle of Charsianon ==
Eager to retaliate against the Abbasid incursion of the previous year, Theophilos initiated a counterinvasion of Abbasid territory in 831, while Muslim border forces had concentrated into a major Abbasid raiding army and attacked the Theme of Cappadocia again. Theophilos, accompanied by the reconciled Domestikos Manuel, was able to cross the Taurus Mountains into Cilicia. With much of its defense absent, he was able to pillage the region. Theophilos' army killed 1,600 to over 2,000 people and took many others prisoner. During this invasion, the Byzantines may have also captured some forts or cities in Cilicia.

Simultaneously, a second Byzantine army, consisting of Thematic troops from Charsianon, reinforced with detachments from imperial Tagmatic forces, engaged the main raiding army, which consisted of the combined forces of Abbasid Tarsus, Mopsuestia, Adana, Eirenopolis, Anazarbos and several other bases on the Al-Awasim. According to Theophanes Continuatus, the Abbasid forces had grown bold and overconfident after their successful capture of Corum the prior year, but this time a Byzantine army opposed them when they invaded the same region again. In Vasiliev's reconstruction, this army was under the command of Eudokimos, while Treadgold and Codoñer reasoned that the Abbasids were met by an imperial field army under Emperor Theophilos' personal command. (Note: Codoñer (p.221) combines the battle with the abovementioned Byzantine attack on Cilicia and proposes that Theophilos attained this victory over the combined Abbasid Cilician armies in Cilicia itself. He reasons that Continuator's text can be construed as describing Theophilos' victory over Abbasid armies who had campaigned against him, rather than when they were campaigning against him.) In the resulting battle, the Byzantines won a resounding victory, after which 25,000 of the defeated Muslims were taken prisoner according to Theophanes Continuatus. This victory also left a significant impression on Byzantine military theorists, as it was being used as a model example of applied tactical doctrine more than a century later during the reign of Constantine VII.

== Aftermath ==
When Theophilos reached Hieria in Bithynia, on the return journey to Constantinople, he was greeted by his wife, Theodora, accompanied by the eparch and the entire Senate of Constantinople. The Emperor remained there for a week so that the huge numbers of captive enemies could be brought to accompany him when he re-entered the capital in triumph. After they had arrived, Theophilos sailed from Bithynia to Saint Mamas in Constantinople, and after three days crossed the Golden Horn to the Blachernae Palace. From there, the emperor led a triumph, and several days of festivities followed, in which the populace received gifts. The spoils and prisoners taken in the campaign were put on display.

One of the Arab warriors taken prisoner in this campaign was noted to have engaged in a duel at the Hippodrome against the eunuch Theodore Krateros, in a tale narrated by the continuator. The Abbasid swordsman was famed for his dexterity and prowess, with even the Domestikos Manuel and Theophilos himself being impressed by his skill. At the Hippodrome, the warrior was commanded to demonstrate his talents on horseback in front of the populace. Though the crowd was pleased, the eunuch Krateros openly mocked the Arab as unremarkable and, in turn, was commanded by the emperor to prove his superiority in combat. Krateros then defeated the warrior in a duel on horseback. Krateros would later be commemorated as one of the 42 Martyrs of Amorium, who were executed after the sack of the city by the Abbasids in 838.

The Byzantine successes in 831 prompted a military retaliation by the Abbasids. Caliph Al-Mamun assembled an army, including his son and heir Abu Ishaq, as well as his other son, Al-Abbas, and launched an invasion into Asia Minor in 832. The Abbasids were able to force Heraclea into submission and captured Panormus and other settlements in addition. During an attempt to relieve the siege of Loulon, a Byzantine army led by Theophilos was worsted and repulsed by Abbasid forces led by Al-Abbas. Eventually, Theophilos attempted to negotiate a peace with Al-Mamun and offered to pay 100,000 nomismata and return the 7,000 Abbasid soldiers (most of whom were presumably captives from the Abbasid defeat at Charsianon) in exchange for the return of settlements captured by the Abbasids, threatening to renew attacks on Muslim territory otherwise, though the Caliph rejected this offer. Warfare continued for the rest of the decade, with Theophilos celebrating a second triumph after he gained further victories in 837.

== Bibliography ==
- Treadgold, Warren (1988). The Byzantine Revival, 780–842.
- Codoñer, Juan Signes (2016). The Emperor Theophilos and the East, 829–842 Court and Frontier in Byzantium During the Last Phase of Iconoclasm. Taylor and Francis. pp. 20–21. ISBN 9781317034278.
- Vasiliev, Alexander A. (1935). Byzance et les Arabes, Tome I: La dynastie d'Amorium (820–867). Corpus Bruxellense Historiae Byzantinae (in French). Vol. 1. French ed.: Henri Grégoire, Marius Canard. Brussels: Éditions de l'Institut de philologie et d'histoire orientales.
- Kaldellis, Anthony (2023). The New Roman Empire: A History of Byzantium. Oxford University Press. ISBN 978-0197549322.
