= Siege of Arsamosata (837) =

Byzantine win over the Abbasids in Turkey

- Part of the Arab–Byzantine wars
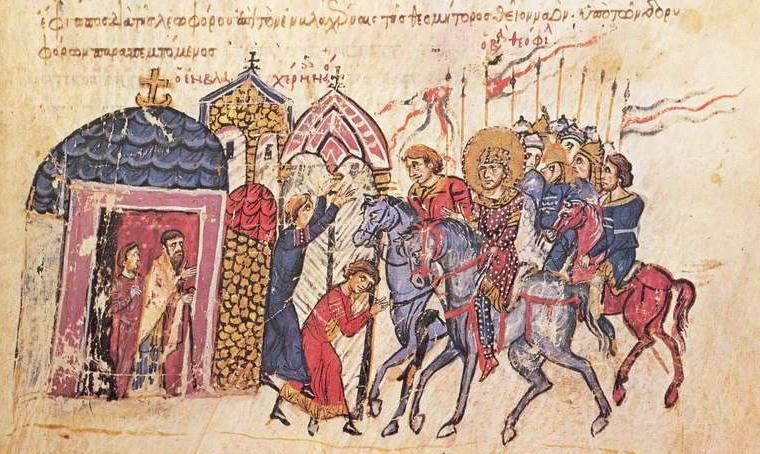
- Theophilos celebrates a Triumph in Constantinople
Date	Summer 837
Location	Arsamosata, modern Elazig, Turkey
Result	Byzantine victory: Melitene pays tribute to Byzantium

Belligerents
Byzantine Empire	Abbasid Caliphate: Emirate of Melitene

Commanders and leaders
Theophilos; Theophobos; Manuel; Alexios Mosele	Umar al-Aqta (possibly) (Note: Umar al-Aqta's involvement in this campaign is not attested in primary sources, but he is recorded as the Emir of Melitene during the Amorium Campaign in 838 (Treadgold p.299), possibly indicating he was such also in 837); Ujayf ibn ‘Anbasa

Strength
Total: 100,000 men (exaggerated figure); 70,000 soldiers; 30,000 servants	Garrison: Unknown; Relief forces: 10,000+

Casualties and losses
Unknown	Entire Garrison; Relief forces: 8,000+

The siege of Arsamosata was a siege of the Abbasid-held city of Arsamosata by the forces of the Byzantine Emperor Theophilos, during his campaign of 837. Theophilos' men invested the city and eventually captured the location, before carrying their invasion further into Armenia. The Byzantines also defeated two Abbasid relief armies in pitched battles during the campaign and forced a nominal submission of Melitene.

== Background ==
In 837 the Emperor Theophilos assembled a large army, drawing men from thematic and tagmatic forces, and launched an invasion into the vicinity of Melitene, seeking to take advantage of the ongoing Abbasid preoccupation with the revolt of Babak Khorramdin. The Byzantines first advanced against Sozopetra and successfully stormed and sacked it. Seeking to press the initiative further, Theophilos led his army eastward and extensively ravaged the regions surrounding Melitene.

== Fall of Arsamosata ==
Having inflicted extensive damage upon this sector of the Al-Awasim, the Byzantine army directed its attention against the heavily fortified city of Arsamosata and soon placed it under an intense siege. Seeking to aid the city, the Abbasid garrison of Melitene marched out and joined forces with tribal warriors from Ṭaiyayē Arab populations settled nearby. The assembled relief column advanced towards the Byzantine siegelines at Arsamosata.

The Byzantines were placed in a difficult strategic position, with the relief army advancing from the rear, while the formidable fortifications and garrison of Arsamosata lay to the front. However, the size of Theophilos' campaigning army enabled him to allocate forces in both directions. Consequently, when the relief force entered the vicinity of the siege, they were intercepted by detachments of Theophilos' army. In the ensuing battle, the Byzantines gained the upper hand and defeated their Abbasid opponents, killing 4,000 of their warriors and putting the rest to flight. This engagement sealed the fate of Arsamosata, as the victorious Byzantines stormed the city and relentlessly pillaged it. The Byzantine army then burned and destroyed Arsamosata.

== Attack on Armenia and Melitene ==
Following the sack of Arsamosata, Theophilos extended his campaign deeper into Abbasid-aligned Armenian territories. The Armenian historian, Stepanos Asoghik, records that the Byzantines captured and pillaged the fortresses of Tsmu, Paghin, Metskert and T'laberd, in the Paghnatundistrict, before advancing into Khozan in Sophene. The Byzantines conducted their invasion with brutality, annihilating all people and animals they came across and leaving the province desolated upon their departure. (Note: Codoñer (p.276-277) argues that Theophilos advanced northwest from Arsamosata and conquered the locations in Paghnatun (Paghin, T’laberd and Metskert) and then Khozan, though he doubts Tsmu was captured as Asoghik claimed as this settlement was off-route from the others)

Advancing along road west from Khozan, Theophilos began the homeward journey to Byzantine territory, but not before conducting another attack against Melitene. The Romans marched on the city of Melitene itself, and at its gates threatened its population with destruction similar to that of Sozopetra, Arsamosata and the Armenian cities. Having already sustained significant losses in their defeat at Arsamosata, Melitene's garrison and inhabitants were forced into nominal submission to the Emperor, providing him with gifts and sums, releasing Byzantine prisoners taken in raids into Anatolia and providing Byzantium hostages on an oath never to raid Anatolia again. Theophilos, wary of becoming bogged down in a siege, due to the heavy fortifications of Melitene, accepted this. The Byzantines retained 1,000 prisoners while mutilating and releasing the rest before marching back to Anatolia, carrying great quantities of loot taken in the campaign. As this occurred, a small Abbasid relief force dispatched from Baghdad, consisting of around 4,000 Elite troops led by a Ujayf ibn ‘Anbasa, reached the lands of Melitene. Perhaps encouraged by the retreat of the Byzantines, the Abbasid force engaged the Byzantines in battle but suffered a crushing defeat. Ujayf narrowly escaped, but most of his men were killed in the fighting.

== Aftermath ==
On his return journey through Anatolia, Theophilos arranged the construction of a palace at Bryas, as a dedication extolling the great victories he had attained in his campaign against Melitene. This construction was modelled after the Abbasid palaces at Baghdad, and Theophilos appointed John the Grammarian, a former Byzantine ambassador to the Caliph, to advise the architects in this construction project. Having made these arrangements, the Emperor returned to Constantinople in triumph, as he had done once before after his victory over the Abbasids in 831. The booty and prisoners taken by the Byzantines in 837 were displayed in a procession accompanied by the Caesar Alexios Mosele, (Note: Treadgold (p.295) reasons that it is likely that Caesar Mosele participated in the Melitene Campaign of 837) after which Theophilos personally drove a chariot in the Hippodrome races, bearing the colours of the Blue faction.

Though the Byzantines had defeated them in 837, the Abbasids had secured a major strategic success in that year with the final defeat of the decades-long Khurramite rebellion and death of Babak Khorramdin, at the hands of the Abbasid commander Afshin. The series of victories won by the Byzantines during the 837 campaign necessitated an overwhelming response by Caliph Al-Mu'tasim, who was able to concentrate his armies for a punishing retaliatory campaign. In 838 Al-Mutasim led a major campaign into Anatolia that targeted the key city of Amorium. After an Abbasid column under the command of Afshin attained a victory against a Byzantine field army, under the personal command of Theophilos, at the battle of Anzen, the Abbasids united their forces into a single column, over 80,000 strong under Al-Mu'tasim, and placed Amorium under siege, culminating in the successful capture and sack of Amorium.

== Bibliography ==
- Warren Treadgold (1988), The Byzantine revival, 780–842.
- Juan Signes Codoñer (2016). The Emperor Theophilos and the East, 829–842 Court and Frontier in Byzantium During the Last Phase of Iconoclasm. Taylor and Francis. pp. 20–21. ISBN 9781317034278.
- Vasiliev, Alexander A. (1935). Byzance et les Arabes, Tome I: La dynastie d'Amorium (820–867). Corpus Bruxellense Historiae Byzantinae (in French). Vol. 1. French ed.: Henri Grégoire, Marius Canard. Brussels: Éditions de l'Institut de philologie et d'histoire orientales.
