= Abbasid invasion of Asia Minor (831) =

831 Abbasid invasion of the Byzantine Empire

- Part of the Arab–Byzantine wars
- Map of Byzantine Asia Minor and the frontier region with the Abbasid Caliphate c. 780
Date	4 July – 24 September 831
Location	Central Asia Minor
Result	Abbasid victory

Belligerents
Abbasid Caliphate	Byzantine Empire

Commanders and leaders
al-Ma'mun; Al-Abbas al-Mu'tasim	Theophilos

The Abbasid invasion of Asia Minor in 831 was a military expedition launched by the Abbasid Caliph al-Ma'mun against the Byzantine Empire. The Abbasids invaded Asia Minor in response to a Muslim defeat in Cilica inflicted by the Byzantine emperor Theophilos. The Abbasids invaded Asia Minor with three separate armies, capturing some major forts and sacking several settlements and defeating Theophilos in a battle. The defeat of the Byzantines forced the emperor to sue for peace.

== Background ==
In the spring of 831, the Byzantine emperor Theophilos was reported to have said that an Abbasid raiding army, which came from the Arab settlement in Cilicia, crossed the border and began raiding Byzantine lands. This Abbasid raiding party was small in numbers, thinking that they would meet no opposition. Learning of this, Theophilos, alongside Manuel the Armenian, quickly gathered his army and marched to meet them. The Byzantines met the Arabs at Charsianon and, with numerical advantage, inflicted a crushing defeat on them. Theophilos returned to Constantinople victorious with the prisoners and received a hero's welcome. The Muslim prisoners were displayed in the Hippodrome of Constantinople.

News of this defeat reached the Abbasid Caliph al-Ma'mun, who was in Damascus. He quickly began making preparations for a retaliation. al-Ma'mun marched to Adana, and there, he received 500 prisoners from the emperor as a sign of good gesture, but the caliph was not appeased. The Caliph was accompanied by his son Al-Abbas and his brother al-Mu'tasim.

== Campaign ==
On July 4, the Abbasid army entered Cappadocia through Cilician Gates. The first target they laid their eyes upon was the city Heraclea Cybistra. This city was already sacked by Abbasids in 806. Heraclea surrendered without any resistance. From there, the three commanders separated with each of their forces to raid by themselves. The raiding party led by al-Ma'mun had little to prey upon since the main forts Cappadocia, Corum and Soandus, were destroyed in the previous year. al-Ma'mun had to contend himself with sacking underground shelters where the peasants took refuge. al-Mu'tasim raiding party captured minor places whatever they could find by allowing its inhabitants to surrender.

Al-Abbas raiding party achieved some resounding success. The Abbasids managed to capture the important fort of Tyana after it surrendered. While seeking to chase for more victories, Al-Abbas met a Byzantine army who were led by emperor Theophilos himself. The Abbasids managed to defeat the Byzantines and capture considerable spoils. By this time, the Abbasids had enough of raiding and concluded the campaign on September 24. They returned to northern Syria.

== Aftermath ==
The Byzantine defeat in Cappadocia forced the emperor to sue for peace with the Abbasid Caliph. However, al-Ma'mun with his enthusiasm to invade Byzantine territory, rejected the peace and in the next year, he invaded Cappadocia and captured Loulon.

== Sources ==
- Warren Treadgold (1988), The Byzantine revival, 780–842.
- John Bagnell Bury (1912), A History of the Eastern Roman Empire from the Fall of Irene to the Accession of Basil I. (A. D. 802–867).
- Leslie Brubaker & John Haldon (2011), Byzantium in the Iconoclast Era, C. 680–850.
