= Manuel the Armenian =

9th-century Byzantine general

Manuel Մանվել
- Born: Late 8th century
- Died: 27 July 838 / c. 860
- Burial place: Monastery of Manuel, Constantinople (modern-day Istanbul, Turkey)
- Relatives: Empress Theodora
- Military career
- Allegiance: Byzantine Empire, Abbasid Caliphate
- Rank: protostrator, strategos of the Anatolics, Domestic of the Schools
- Conflicts: Battle of Anzen

Manuel the Armenian (Ancient Greek: Μανουήλ ὁ Ἀρμένιος), was a prominent Byzantine general of Armenian origin, active from c. 810 until his death. After reaching the highest military ranks, a palace conspiracy forced him to seek refuge in the Abbasid court in 829. He returned to Byzantine service the next year, receiving the position of Domestic of the Schools from Emperor Theophilos, who had married his niece Theodora. Manuel remained in the post throughout Theophilos's reign, and reportedly saved the emperor's life in the Battle of Anzen in 838. According to one report, he died on 27 July 838 of wounds received during the battle, but other sources record his survival past this date, ascribing him a major role in the regency that governed the empire after Theophilos's death, and report that he died some time around 860.

== Biography ==
Manuel was of Armenian origin, and the brother of Marinos, the father of the future Byzantine empress Theodora. Manuel first appears in the reign of Michael I Rangabe (ruled 811–813), when he held the post of protostrator (head of the imperial stables). At the time, he must still have been young, probably in his twenties. Although he urged Michael to confront Leo the Armenian, following Michael's deposition by Leo (r. 813–820), Manuel was promoted to the rank of patrikios and entrusted with the post of strategos (military governor) of the Armeniac or the Anatolic Theme. The latter post was the most senior of the Byzantine Empire's thematic governors, and Leo himself had held the office prior to his accession. According to historians John B. Bury and Warren Treadgold, in early 819 and for about a year, Leo seems to have appointed Manuel to the exceptional post of monostrategos (lit. 'single-general') of the five land themes of Asia Minor, but this unusual concentration of command authority was apparently directed towards the more effective suppression of iconophile resistance against Leo's reinstatement of Iconoclasm rather than for military purposes. This appointment is, however, most likely a misreading of the primary source, according to the editors of the Prosopographie der mittelbyzantinischen Zeit. According to the history of Michael the Syrian, at about the same time Manuel was responsible for the negotiations with the Khurramite refugees and their leader, Nasr, who became baptized as Theophobos in Byzantine service; however, Michael's chronology of this episode is confused and of doubtful accuracy.

Manuel's career under Leo's successor, Michael II the Amorian (r. 820–829), is unclear, as he is not mentioned in the sources during this period. Certainly at the time of the outbreak of the great rebellion of Thomas the Slav, the strategos of the Armeniacs was Olbianos, while the Anatolics joined the rebellion. Manuel himself, however, evidently remained loyal to Michael, and it was probably the latter who raised him to the high court rank of magistros. The editors of the Prosopographie der mittelbyzantinischen Zeit suggest that Manuel may have been recalled by Michael to Constantinople, especially if the marriage of Michael's son and heir Theophilos (r. 829–842) and Manuel's niece Theodora took place around 821, as suggested by E.W. Brooks, and not around 830, as suggested by Treadgold.

=== Escape to the Caliphate ===
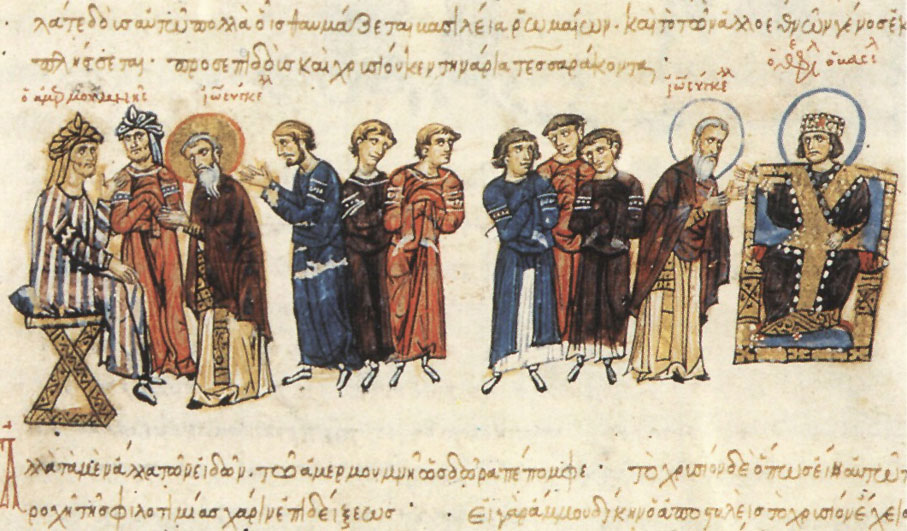
The embassy of John the Grammarian in 829 to Ma'mun (depicted left) from Theophilos (depicted right), as depicted in the Madrid Skylitzes.

In 829, either some time before (according to Theophanes Continuatus, followed by E.W. Brooks and the Prosopographie der mittelbyzantinischen Zeit and others) or shortly after (according to Symeon Logothetes, accepted by Treadgold, the Oxford Dictionary of Byzantium and others) the death of Michael and the accession of Theophilos, Manuel defected to the Abbasids as a result of machinations at court: the logothetes tou dromou (foreign minister) Myron had accused him to the new emperor of plotting to seize the throne. Using the carriages of the imperial post, he crossed Asia Minor in haste and offered his services to Caliph al-Ma'mun (r. 813–833), on condition that he would not be forced to convert to Islam. According to the 13th-century historian Vardan Areveltsi, so great was Ma'mun's joy at this defection that he gave Manuel a daily salary of 1,306 silver dirhams, and continually presented him with gifts.

Theophilos, in turn, was hesitant to believe the accusations, and was eventually convinced by the protovestiarios (chamberlain) Leo Chamodrakon and the synkellos John the Grammarian of his general's innocence. He therefore resolved to get Manuel to return, and sent John the Grammarian to Baghdad on a diplomatic mission in the winter of 829/830, ostensibly in order to announce his accession. John was indeed able to see Manuel in private and offered him the Emperor's pardon, which Manuel seemed to accept, although for the time being, Manuel remained publicly loyal to his Abbasid allegiance.

In the summer of 830, Manuel participated in an Abbasid expedition against the Khurramite rebels of Babak Khorramdin in Adharbayjan, alongside a contingent of Byzantine captives. The campaign was nominally led by Ma'mun's own son, Abbas, but it is likely, according to Treadgold, that the more experienced Manuel was the actual commander, as Arabic and Syriac sources record that he commanded an "army of Arabs and Persians". After winning a few modest successes, the army turned back south. Manuel, who by then had apparently won the confidence of his Arab minders, suggested that he and 'Abbas take a part of the army and raid over the Pass of Hadath into Byzantine Cappadocia. Once across the mountains, he and the other Byzantine captives neutralized Abbas and his escort, took their arms and escaped. Abbas and his companions were left behind unmolested, and allowed to return to Abbasid territory.

=== Domestic of the Schools ===
Theophilos welcomed Manuel with open arms, and named him Domestic of the Schools, commander of the elite tagma (regiment) of the Scholae and de facto commander-in-chief of the entire army. Manuel would remain Theophilos's leading general for the remainder of his reign. Furthermore, as the uncle of Theophilos's wife, the Empress Theodora, his position at court was now unassailable, as shown by the fact that the Emperor later served as godfather for Manuel's children. The Syriac sources even report that Theophilos made Manuel governor of the "inner regions" of the Empire.

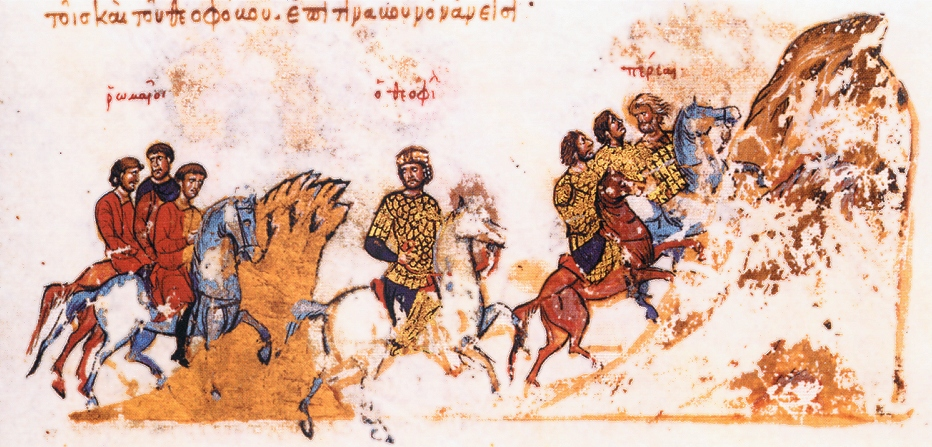
The Byzantine army and Theophilos retreat towards a mountain after the Battle of Anzen, miniature from the Madrid Skylitzes.

In 831, Manuel accompanied Theophilos in an expedition against a raid by the Cilician Arabs. The Byzantines caught up with the Arabs near the fort of Charsianon, and inflicted a heavy defeat upon them. Manuel is also recorded as accompanying Theophilos on his great expedition in 837 against the Arab cities of northern Mesopotamia, which led to the sack of Zapetra and Arsamosata. This campaign, however, and the atrocities committed by the Byzantines' former Khurramite troops after the fall of Zapetra, provoked a large-scale retaliatory campaign by Caliph al-Mu'tasim (r. 833–842). Manuel again accompanied the Emperor as his senior general, along with Nasr/Theophobos as commander of a large corps composed of former Khurramite refugees. Manuel participated in the disastrous Battle of Anzen on 22 July 838, where Theophilos confronted the army of general al-Afshin. During that battle, the imperial army broke and fled, and Theophilos with his retinue were surrounded by the Arabs on a hill with some 2,000 Khurramites. When some of the latter reportedly began planning to surrender the Emperor to the Arabs, Manuel seized the Emperor's horse by the bridle and forcibly led him away. With a few other officers, he managed to break through the Arab lines, and brought Theophilos to safety in the nearby village of Chiliokomon. During the battle, he received heavy wounds, and according to the chronicle of Symeon Logothetes, he died of them five days later, on 27 July 838. He was buried in his palace in Constantinople, which lay near the Cistern of Aspar and which became a monastery named after him, now traditionally identified with the Kefeli Mosque.

=== Possible life after 838 ===
The chronicles of Genesios and Theophanes Continuatus (and following them Skylitzes and Zonaras), however, report that he survived his wounds, allegedly being miraculously cured after renouncing iconoclasm at the behest of some monks. The same sources report that after Theophilos's death, he assumed the overall command of the Byzantine army and was appointed a member of the regency council for the infant new emperor Michael III (r. 842–867) along with Theoktistos and Bardas. His standing was so high that the populace is said to have acclaimed him as emperor at the Hippodrome, but he refused to accept the post. The same writers report that he played an important role in the restoration of the icons, and that he became a protomagistros before falling out with Theoktistos, being accused of lèse-majesté, and retiring from public life to his estates. According to the same sources, in the late 850s, he saved the Emperor's life in another battle at Anzen and died shortly after. Traditional scholarship has largely accepted this account, but some modern historians have expressed doubts as to its veracity. The Belgian Byzantinist Henri Grégoire was the first to highlight its incompatibility with the narrative of Symeon Logothetes, speculating that it was a later invention, possibly carried out by the monks of the Monastery of Manuel, who venerated him as a saint and tried to mitigate his iconoclast past. Warren Treadgold, who considers Symeon Logothetes more reliable, also dismissed the reports of Manuel's post-838 survival as invented.

Other modern scholars continue to support the possibility of his continued life after 838, especially given the existence of a seal, dated to the mid-9th century, which names "Manuel patrikios, imperial protospatharios, magistros, and bagoulos of the Emperor", which seems to confirm both his survival into at least the early years of Michael III's reign, and his reported role as a member of the regency. Even so, the stories about his activities, and in particular his role in the restoration of the icons and the alleged second battle at Anzen (which is clearly inspired by the events of 838), are regarded as almost certainly fictitious. However, it may be that the story of his death after Theoktistos's downfall is reliable, which would probably place it sometime between 855 and 863.

== Sources ==
- Guilland, Rodolphe (1967). Recherches sur les institutions byzantines [Studies on the Byzantine Institutions]. Berliner byzantinische Arbeiten 35 (in French). Vol. I. Berlin and Amsterdam: Akademie-Verlag & Adolf M. Hakkert. OCLC 878894516.
- Kazhdan, Alexander, ed. (1991). The Oxford Dictionary of Byzantium. Oxford and New York: Oxford University Press. ISBN 0-19-504652-8.
- Lilie, Ralph-Johannes; Ludwig, Claudia; Pratsch, Thomas; Zielke, Beate (2000). "Manuel (# 4707)". Prosopographie der mittelbyzantinischen Zeit: 1. Abteilung (641–867), Band 3: Leon (# 4271) – Placentius (# 6265) (in German). Berlin and Boston: De Gruyter. pp. 136–141. ISBN 978-3-11-016673-6.
- Treadgold, Warren T. (1979). "The Chronological Accuracy of the "Chronicle" of Symeon the Logothete for the Years 813–845". Dumbarton Oaks Papers. 33. Washington, DC: Dumbarton Oaks: 157–197. doi:10.2307/1291437. JSTOR 1291437.
- Treadgold, Warren (1988). The Byzantine Revival, 780–842. Stanford, California: Stanford University Press. ISBN 978-0-8047-1462-4.
- van Millingen, Alexander (1912). Byzantine Churches of Constantinople. London: MacMillan & Company.
- Vasiliev, Alexander A. (1935). Byzance et les Arabes, Tome I: La dynastie d'Amorium (820–867). Corpus Bruxellense Historiae Byzantinae (in French). Vol. 1. French ed.: Henri Grégoire, Marius Canard. Brussels: Éditions de l'Institut de philologie et d'histoire orientales.
