= Capture of Loulon =

Part of the Arab–Byzantine wars in 832

Capture of Loulon (832)
- Part of the Arab–Byzantine wars
- Map of Byzantine Asia Minor and the frontier region with the Abbasid Caliphate c. 780
Date	May – September 832
Location	Loulon, near Hasangazi, Turkey
Result	Abbasid victory

Belligerents
Abbasid Caliphate	Byzantine Empire

Commanders and leaders
al-Ma'mun; Ujayf ibn Anbasa (POW)	Theophilos

The Capture of Loulon was a military engagement between the Abbasid army and the Byzantine garrison of Loulon. In 832, the Abbasid Caliph, al-Ma'mun, invaded Asia Minor and besieged the great fort of Loulon. The siege prolonged for several months, and after the defeat of the Byzantine relief force, the fortress surrendered to the Abbasids.

== Background ==
After the successful campaign by the Abbasid Caliph, al-Ma'mun, against the Byzantines in 831, his enthusiasm for another campaign has grown. From February to April of 832, the caliph was busy taking down a Coptic revolt in Egypt. Afterwards, the Caliph returned to Damascus, where he found the Byzantine ambassador, possibly John the Grammarian, with a letter from the Byzantine emperor Theophilos requesting peace. The greeting of the emperor's name was started before the Caliph's name, making al-Ma'mun ignore the letter without reading and using it as a pretext for a new campaign. The Abbasids laid their eyes on the Byzantine fortress of Loulon. This fort was the only Cappadocian fort of importance that the Muslims have not captured.

== Capture ==
In May 832, the Abbasids arrived at the fort and began the siege. Loulon was well supplied and fortified. The fort withstood the Arabs for three months or 100 days. Seeing the fort resisting him, the campaign no longer amused the caliph, and instead, he initiated the blockade by constructing two military forts near Loulon. Al-Ma'mun placed the general Ujayf ibn Anbasa as the commander with a large army and enough supplies to besiege for a year. However, after the Caliph's departure, the Byzantine garrison managed to capture Ujayf using a trick. By this time, probably in September, a Byzantine relief army led by Theophilos was marching to relieve the fort. Learning of his approach, the Abbasids from the two forts, though deprived of their leader, marched to meet them. The battle ended in victory for the Abbasids, with the Byzantine camp plundered and the emperor escaping alive.

Seeing the emperor's defeat, the Byzantine agreed to surrender and release Ujayf in exchange for safe departure, and the Arabs kept their word. They took the place and garrisoned it.

== Aftermath ==
The capture of Loulon by the Arabs deprived the Byzantines of major forts in Cappadocia, which was open to regular raids and attacks. Theophilos once again requested peace with the caliph, insisting on paying tribute and releasing the Arab prisoners captured at the battle of Charsianon in exchange for returning lost forts by the Arabs, and threatened him with attacks if he did not comply. The Caliph refused his demands. Instead, he began preparing another great army to conquer the Byzantine Empire. However, the Caliph died on August 9, 833. His successor, al-Mu'tasim, called off the attack and withdrew from the Byzantine territory.

== Sources ==
- Warren Treadgold (1988), The Byzantine revival, 780–842.
- John Bagnell Bury (1912), A History of the Eastern Roman Empire from the Fall of Irene to the Accession of Basil I. (A. D. 802–867).
- Leslie Brubaker & John Haldon (2011), Byzantium in the Iconoclast Era, C. 680–850.
