= Leo Chamaidrakon =

Leo Chamodrakon or Chamaidrakon (Greek: Λέων Χαμοδράκων/Χαμαιδράκων) was a senior Byzantine palace official, holding the post of protovestiarios during the reign of Theophilos (r. 829–843). He is mentioned early in Theophilos' reign as participating in the proceedings against the murderers of Leo V the Armenian (r. 813–820), and again later, when he defended Manuel the Armenian from accusations of treason.

== Sources ==
- Winkelmann, Friedhelm; Lilie, Ralph-Johannes; Ludwig, Claudia; Pratsch, Thomas; Rochow, Ilse; Zielke, Beate (2000). "Leon (#4454)". Prosopographie der mittelbyzantinischen Zeit: I. Abteilung (641–867), 3. Band: Leon (#4271) – Placentius (#6265) (in German). Berlin and New York: Walter de Gruyter. pp. 57–58. ISBN 978-3-11-016673-6.
