= Battle of Anzen =

838 battle of the Arab-Byzantine wars

Coordinates: 40°23′24″N 36°05′24″E

- Part of the Arab–Byzantine wars
- Map of the Byzantine and Arab campaigns in the years 837–838
Date	22 July 838
Location	near Dazman (modern-day Turhal, Tokat, Turkey)
Result	Abbasid victory

Belligerents
Byzantine Empire	Abbasid Caliphate

Commanders and leaders
Emperor Theophilos; Theophobos; Manuel the Armenian (DOW)?	Afshin; Emir Omar al-Aqta

Strength
25,000–40,000	20,000–30,000

The Battle of Anzen or Dazimon was fought on 22 July 838 at Anzen or Dazimon (now Dazmana (Akçatarla), Turkey) between the Byzantine Empire and the forces of the Abbasid Caliphate. The Abbasids had launched a massive expedition with two separate armies in retaliation for the Byzantine emperor Theophilos's successes the previous year, and aimed to sack Amorion, one of Byzantium's largest cities. Theophilos with his army confronted the smaller Muslim army, under the Iranian vassal prince Afshin, at Dazimon.

The numerically superior Byzantine army was initially successful, but when Theophilos resolved to lead an attack in person, his absence from his usual post caused panic among the Byzantine troops, who feared that he had been killed. Coupled with a counterattack by Afshin's Turkish horse-archers, the Byzantine army broke and fled. Theophilos and his guard were surrounded on a hill, but managed to escape. The defeat opened the way for the sack of Amorion a few weeks later, one of the most serious blows Byzantium suffered in the centuries-long Arab–Byzantine wars.

== Background ==
As the young Theophilos (r. 829–842) ascended the Byzantine throne in 829, the Arab–Byzantine wars had continued on and off for almost two centuries. An ambitious man and a convinced iconoclast, Theophilos sought to bolster his regime and gain support for his religious policies by military success against the Abbasid Caliphate, Byzantium's major antagonist. Theophilos launched a series of campaigns against the Caliphate throughout the 830s. These were only moderately successful, but sufficient for the imperial propaganda to portray Theophilos in the traditional Roman manner as a "victorious emperor". In 837 Theophilos personally led a major campaign to the region of the upper Euphrates, sacking the cities of Arsamosata and Sozopetra – which some sources claim as Abbasid caliph al-Mu'tasim's (r. 833–842) own birthplace – and forcing the city of Melitene to pay tribute and deliver hostages in return for being spared.

In response, al-Mu'tasim decided to launch a major punitive expedition against Byzantium, aiming to capture the two major Byzantine cities of central Anatolia: Ancyra and Amorion. The latter was probably the largest city in Anatolia at the time, as well as the birthplace of the reigning Amorian dynasty and consequently of particular symbolic importance; according to the chronicles, al-Mu'tasim's soldiers painted the word "Amorion" on their shields and banners. A vast army was gathered at Tarsus (80,000 men according to Treadgold), which was then divided into two main forces. The northern force, under the Iranian vassal prince of Usrushana Afshin, would invade the Armeniac theme from the region of Melitene, joining up with the forces of the city's emir, Omar al-Aqta. The southern, main force, under the caliph himself, would pass the Cilician Gates into Cappadocia and head to Ancyra. After the city was taken, the Arab armies would join and march to Amorion. Afshin's force included, according to John Skylitzes, the entire army of the vassal Armenian princes, and numbered an estimated 20,000 (Haldon) to 30,000 men (Treadgold), among whom were some 10,000 Turkish horse-archers.

On the Byzantine side, Theophilos became soon aware of the Caliph's intentions and set out from Constantinople in early June. His army included the men from the Anatolian and possibly also the European themes, the elite tagmata regiments, as well as a contingent of Persian and Kurdish Khurramites. Under their leader Nasr (converted to Christianity and baptized as Theophobos), these people had fled religious persecution in the caliphate, deserted to the empire in the previous years, and formed the so-called "Persian tourma". Setting up camp at Dorylaion, the Emperor divided his forces: a strong corps was sent to reinforce the garrison of Amorion, while he himself set out with the remainder (circa 25,000 according to Haldon and 40,000 according to Treadgold) to interpose himself between the Cilician Gates and Ancyra.

== Battle ==
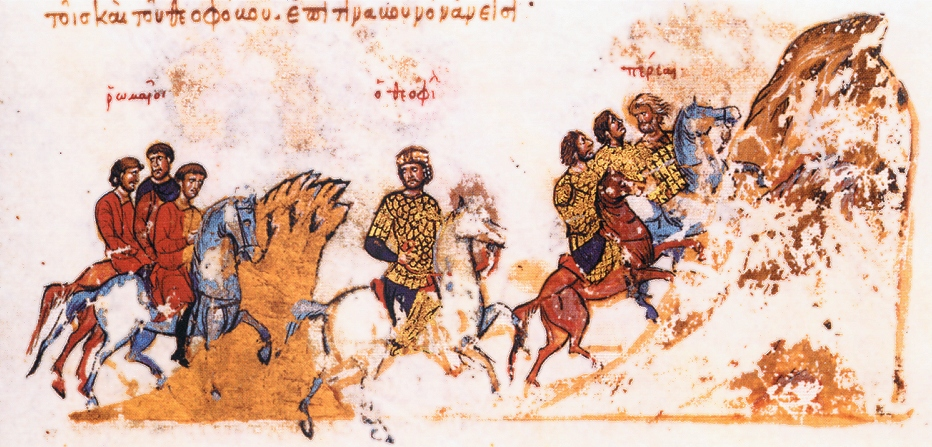
The Byzantine army and Theophilos retreat towards a mountain, miniature from the Madrid Skylitzes.

In mid-June, Afshin crossed the Anti-Taurus Mountains and encamped at the fort of Dazimon (Greek: Δαζιμῶν, modern Dazmana), between Amaseia and Tokat, a strategically important location which served as a concentration point (aplekton) for the Byzantines. A few days later, on 19 June, the vanguard of the main Abbasid army also invaded Byzantine territory, followed two days after by the Caliph with the main body. Theophilos was informed of these movements in mid-July. Afshin's force was smaller, but also threatened to cut off his supply lines. Consequently, the Emperor left a small covering force against the Caliph's army and marched east to confront Afshin. On 21 July, the imperial army came into view of the Arab force, and encamped on a hill in the plain of Dazimonitis south of the fort of Dazimon, named Anzen (Greek: Ἀνζῆν).

Although Theophilos's principal commanders, Theophobos and the Domestic of the Schools Manuel, both advised for a surprise night attack, the Emperor sided with the opinion of the other officers and resolved to wait and launch his attack on the next day. The Byzantine army attacked at dawn, and initially made progress: they drove back one wing of the opposite army, inflicting 3,000 casualties on the Arabs. Near noon, Theophilos resolved to reinforce the other wing and detached 2,000 Byzantines and the Kurdish contingent to do so, abandoning his post and passing behind his own army's lines. At this point, however, Afshin launched his Turkish horse-archers in a counter-attack which halted the Byzantine advance and allowed the Arab forces to regroup. The Byzantine troops then noticed the emperor's absence, and, thinking he had been killed, began to waver. This soon turned into a disorderly retreat; some men fled as far as Constantinople, bringing with them the rumour that the Emperor had been killed. Some units, however, were apparently able to retreat in good order and assemble at a place called Chiliokomon.

Theophilos found himself isolated with his tagmata and the Kurds on the hill of Anzen. The Arabs proceeded to surround the hill, but the Byzantines were saved by a sudden rain, which loosened the strings of the Turkish bows, rendering them useless. Afshin then sent for catapults to be brought up to batter the Byzantine position. At the same time, Theophilos's officers, afraid of treachery by the Kurdish troops, persuaded him to withdraw. Breaking through the Arab lines and suffering many wounds in the process (the sources variously credit Manuel, who was severely wounded and possibly died soon after, and Theophobos for saving the Emperor), Theophilos and his small escort managed to reach safety at Chiliokomon, where he gradually re-assembled the remnants of his army.

== Aftermath ==
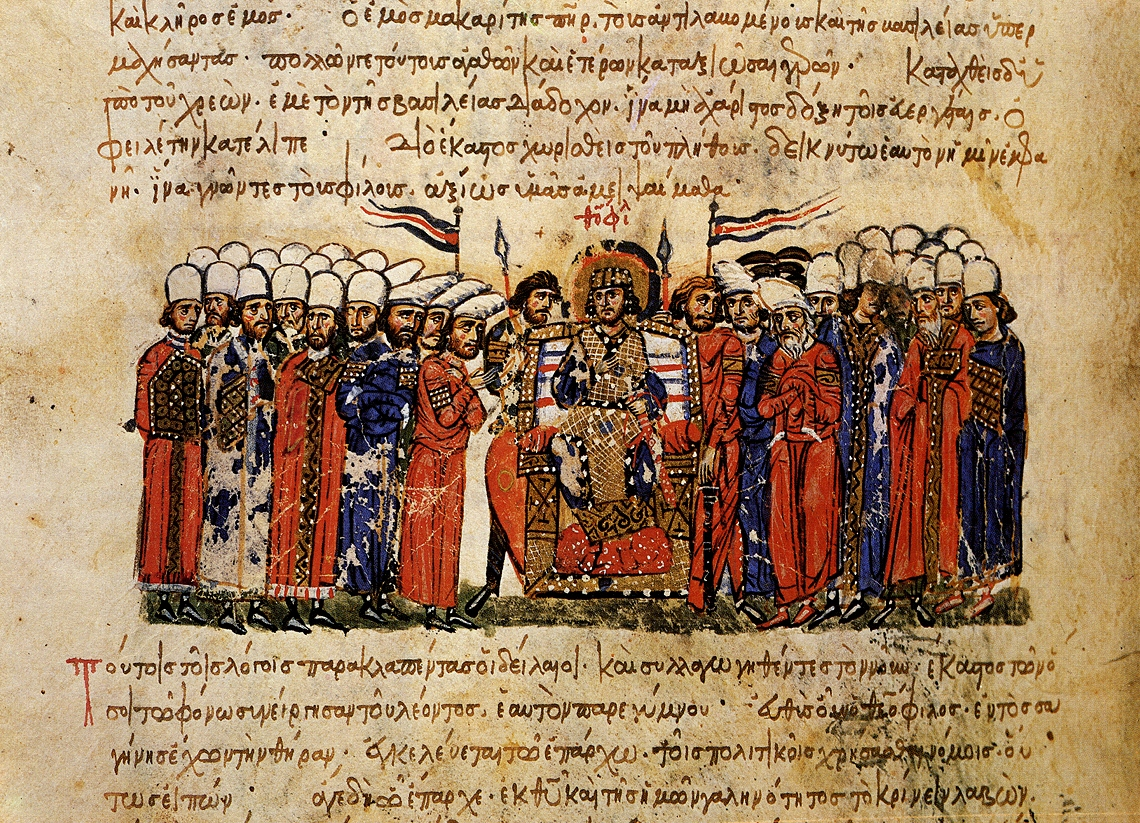
The Emperor Theophilos and his court, miniature from the Madrid Skylitzes chronicle.

In the aftermath of this defeat, and with rumours circulating in Constantinople of his death, Theophilos's position was precarious. He abandoned the campaign and withdrew to Dorylaion, whence he soon departed for the imperial capital. Ancyra itself was left abandoned, and plundered by the Arab army on 27 July. Then the united Abbasid army marched unopposed to Amorion, which fell after a siege of two weeks. Out of its entire population of some 70,000, only about half survived the sack, to be sold as slaves. The fall of the city was one of the heaviest blows Byzantium suffered in the entire 9th century, both in material and symbolic terms. However, news of a rebellion in the Caliphate forced al-Mu'tasim to withdraw soon after.

At the same time, Theophilos had to deal with a revolt by Theophobos and his Kurds. When rumours of Theophilos's death reached the capital, the name of Theophobos, who was related to the Emperor by marriage and apparently an iconodule, was put forward by some as the new emperor. On returning to the city, Theophilos recalled his general, but the latter, fearful of being punished, fled with his loyal Kurds to Sinope, where he was proclaimed emperor. In the event, however, Theophobos was persuaded to surrender peacefully in the next year, while the "Persian" corps was disbanded and its men dispersed throughout the themes.

Though initially appearing decisive, the defeat at Anzen and the subsequent sack of Amorion were militarily of no long-term importance to the Byzantine Empire, since the Abbasids failed to follow up on their success. They did, however, play a crucial role in discrediting iconoclasm, which had always relied on military success to maintain its validity. Shortly after Theophilos's sudden death in 842, the veneration of icons was restored as part of the Triumph of Orthodoxy throughout the Empire. The Battle of Anzen is also notable for illustrating the difficulties faced by the Byzantine military of the time against horse-archers, a remarkable change from the army of the 6th–7th centuries, when such skills formed a core part of Byzantine tactical doctrine. It is also remarkable for being the first confrontation of the middle Byzantine army with the Turkic nomads from Central Asia, whose descendants, the Seljuq Turks, would emerge as Byzantium's major antagonists from the mid-11th century on.

== Notes ==
a: The claim that Sozopetra or Arsamosata was Mu'tasim's native city is found only in Byzantine sources. This claim is dismissed by most scholars as a later invention, i.e. as a parallel to Amorium, the likely birthplace of Theophilos. It was probably deliberately added to balance and lessen the effect of the blow that the latter's fall represented.

== Sources ==
- Haldon, John (2001). The Byzantine Wars: Battles and Campaigns of the Byzantine Era. Stroud, Gloucestershire: Tempus. ISBN 0-7524-1795-9.
- Hollingsworth, P. A.; Cutler, A. (1991). "Theophobos". In Kazhdan, Alexander (ed.). The Oxford Dictionary of Byzantium. Oxford and New York: Oxford University Press. pp. 2067–2068. ISBN 0-19-504652-8.
- Kiapidou, Irini-Sofia (17 January 2003). "Battle of Dazimon, 838". Encyclopedia of the Hellenic World, Asia Minor. Athens: Foundation of the Hellenic World. Archived from the original on 21 July 2011.
- Treadgold, Warren (1988). The Byzantine Revival, 780–842. Stanford, California: Stanford University Press. ISBN 978-0-8047-1462-4.
- Treadgold, Warren (1997). A History of the Byzantine State and Society. Stanford, California: Stanford University Press. ISBN 0-8047-2630-2.
- Vasiliev, Alexander A. (1935). Byzance et les Arabes, Tome I: La dynastie d'Amorium (820–867). Corpus Bruxellense Historiae Byzantinae (in French). Vol. 1. French ed.: Henri Grégoire, Marius Canard. Brussels: Éditions de l'Institut de philologie et d'histoire orientales.
- Whittow, Mark (1996). The Making of Byzantium, 600–1025. Berkeley and Los Angeles, California: University of California Press. ISBN 978-0-520-20496-6.
