= Theophobos =

Byzantine general (died 842)

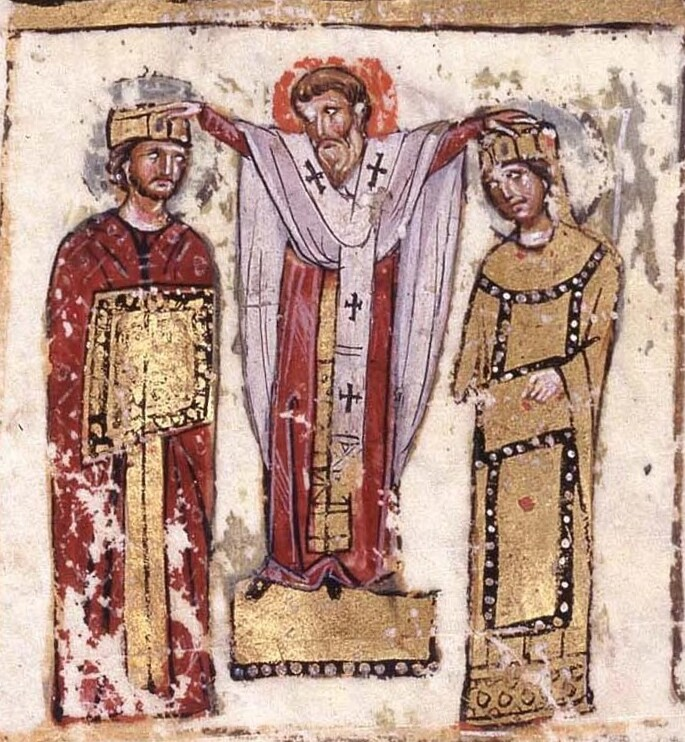
- Miniature depicting the marriage of Theophobos (left) to a relative of the emperor Theophilos in 834.

Patrikios
- Exousiastes of the Persians; 834–842
- Monarch: Theophilos

Personal details
- Born: Nasr c. 810
- Died: 842

Military service
- Allegiance: Byzantine Empire (834-842)
- Battles/wars: Arab–Byzantine wars Siege of Sozopetra (837) Siege of Arsamosata (837) Battle of Anzen (838)

Theophobos (Greek: Θεόφοβος) or Theophobus, originally Nasir (Persian: ناصر), Nasr (نصر), or Nusayr (نصیر), was a commander of the Khurramites who converted to Christianity and entered Byzantine service under Emperor Theophilos (r. 829–843). Raised to high rank and married into the imperial family, Theophobos was given command of his fellow Khurramites and served under Theophilos in his wars against the Abbasid Caliphate in 837–838. After the Byzantines' defeat at the Battle of Anzen, he was proclaimed emperor by his own men, but did not pursue this claim. Instead he peacefully submitted to Theophilos in the next year and was apparently pardoned, until he was executed by the dying emperor in 842 to prevent a challenge to the accession of Michael III.

== Biography ==
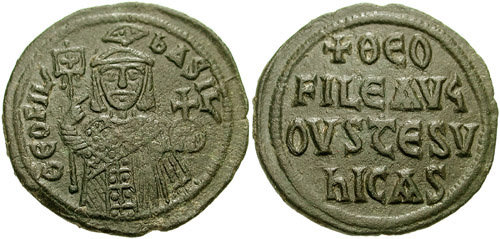
Follis of Emperor Theophilos.

Theophobos was born to a family originally belonging to the Iranian aristocracy. He was originally a member of the Khurramite sect in western Iran, which was being persecuted by the Abbasid Caliphate. In October/November 833, they were defeated by the armies of Caliph al-Mu'tasim (r. 833–842) under Ishaq ibn Ibrahim. Thus, in 834, Nasr with some fourteen thousand other Khurramites, crossed the Armenian highland and fled to the Byzantine Empire. There, they converted to Christianity, were given widows from military families as wives, and enrolled into the Byzantine army in the so-called "Persian tourma". Nasr, now baptized Theophobos ('lit. 'fearful/respectful of God'), was placed at the head of these troops, raised to the high rank of patrikios and given the hand of either Theophilos's sister or a sister of Empress Theodora in marriage. The addition of the "Persian" corps greatly strengthened the Byzantine military: not only were its members implacable enemies of the Arabs, but they may have raised the number of effectives in the Byzantine army by as much as a sixth. A seal belonging to Theophobos affords him the style of "exousiastes of the Persians", indicating that Theophilos may have intended to install him as a ruler of a Byzantine-allied principality, probably in Azerbaijan and Kurdistan.

Already in 837, Theophobos and the new Khurramite corps campaigned with Theophilos in his campaign in the region of the Upper Euphrates around Melitene, where they brutally sacked the city of Zapetra (Ζάπετρα) or Sozopetra (Σωζόπετρα). In September of the same year, some 16,000 more Khurramites fled into the Byzantine Empire, following the final suppression of their movement by the Abbasid army.

Theophobos also participated in the campaign of 838 against al-Mu'tasim's retaliatory invasion. He was present at the catastrophic Byzantine defeat at the Battle of Anzen, where he according to some accounts saved the emperor's life (other accounts credit Manuel the Armenian with the feat). In the aftermath of the battle, however, the "Persian" troops assembled at Sinope and declared Theophobos emperor, most likely against his will. The exact reason behind this move or the exact sequence of events are unclear. However, after the defeat at Anzen, the rumour had spread to Constantinople that Theophilos had been killed, and it appears that Theophobos, who was possibly an iconodule (as opposed to the staunchly iconoclast Theophilos) was suggested by some among the Byzantine Empire's elite as the new emperor.

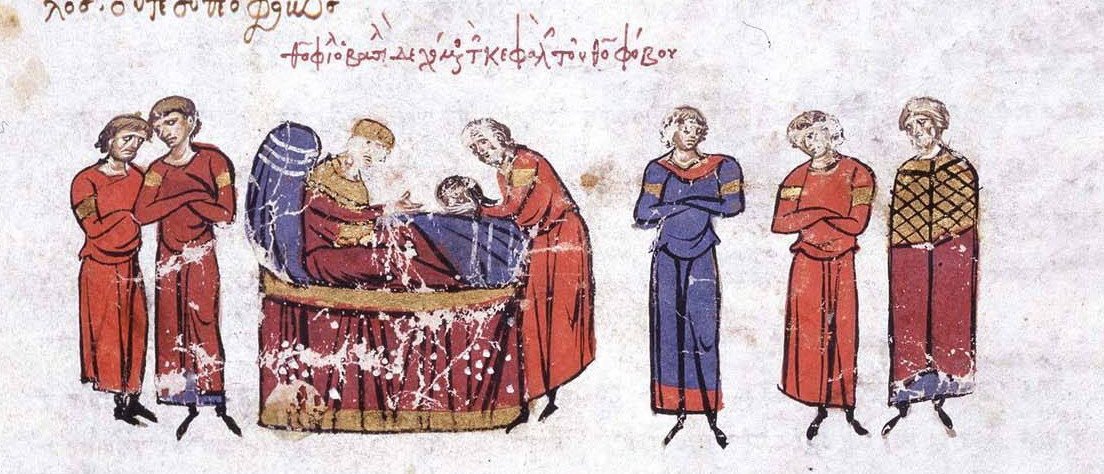
The head of Theophobos is brought to Emperor Theophilos on his deathbed.

Despite being proclaimed and crowned—probably according to Sasanian ritual—by his men, Theophobos made no move against Theophilos, and the "Persian" troops remained quiescent at Sinope. Instead, he quickly engaged in secret negotiations with the emperor, who in 839 led an army against the rebels. Theophobos agreed to surrender and was restored to his high offices, while his men, numbering some 30,000, were reportedly split up into regiments of 2,000 men and divided among the provincial forces of themata. Theophobos was restored to his previous high position in the army, but this was not to last. Islamic sources report that he died in battle in 839 or 840, but the Byzantine sources contain a different, and more likely, account: in 842, Theophilos, already in declining health and about to die, had Theophobos executed by his brother-in-law Petronas in order to secure the succession of his infant son and heir, Michael III (r. 842–867).

== Sources ==
- Bosworth, C. E., ed. (1991). The History of al-Ṭabarī, Volume XXXIII: Storm and Stress Along the Northern Frontiers of the ʿAbbāsid Caliphate: The Caliphate of al-Muʿtasim, A.D. 833–842/A.H. 218–227. SUNY Series in Near Eastern Studies. Albany, New York: State University of New York Press. ISBN 978-0-7914-0493-5.
- Codoñer, Juan Signes (2016). The Emperor Theophilos and the East, 829–842: Court and Frontier in Byzantium during the Last Phase of Iconoclasm. Routledge. ISBN 9781317034278.
- Kazhdan, Alexander, ed. (1991). The Oxford Dictionary of Byzantium. Oxford and New York: Oxford University Press. ISBN 0-19-504652-8.
- Rekaya, M. (1977). "Mise au point sur Théophobe et l'alliance de Babek avec Théophile (833/834-839/840)". Byzantion (in French). 44: 43–67.
- Rosser, J. (1974). "Theophilus' Khurramite Policy and its Finale: The Revolt of Theophobus' Persian Troops in 838". Βυζαντινά. 6: 263–271.
- Treadgold, Warren (1997). A History of the Byzantine State and Society. Stanford, California: Stanford University Press. ISBN 0-8047-2630-2.
- Venetis, Evangelos (2005). "Ḵorramis in Byzantium". In Yarshater, Ehsan (ed.). Encyclopædia Iranica (Online ed.). Encyclopædia Iranica Foundation.
