= Exousiastes =

Exousiastes (Greek: εξουσιαστής, literally, "one who executes authority") was a style applied in the Byzantine Empire to some sovereign foreign rulers, considered higher in rank than an ordinary archon. The term was in currency in the 10th and 11th centuries because, at that time, the term basileus ("king") was reserved for the Byzantine monarch only.

A chapter from De Ceremoniis of Constantine VII (r. 913–959), a Byzantine book of court protocols, lists a "renowned exousiastes of Abasgia" and a "most respected and noble exousiastes of the Muslims". The ruler of Alania is afforded a variant title, exousiokrator. The address exousiastes of Abasgia is also found multiple times in De Administrando Imperio of Constantine VII and the correspondence of Nicholas I Mystikos.

Further, examples of occasional usage of the term include "exousiastes of Babylon" for the Caliph of Baghdad by Anna Komnene, "Pankratios, exousiastes of Abasgia" for Bagrat IV of Georgia by John Skylitzes, also for Simeon I of Bulgaria in the letters of Theodore Daphnopates, "Constantine, exousiastes of Diokleia and Serbia" on a seal belonging to Constantine Bodin of Duklja, and "Theophobos, exousiastes of Persians" on a seal of the Khurramite leader Theophobos.

== See also ==
- Archon
- Kouropalates
