= Battle of Enna (835) =

- Part of the Muslim conquest of Sicily; Arab–Byzantine wars
Date	Summer 835
Location	Enna
Result	Aghlabid victory

Belligerents
Aghlabid dynasty	Byzantine Empire

Commanders and leaders
Al-Fadhl ibn Ya'qub	Byzantine Strategos (WIA)

Strength
Unknown	Unknown

The Battle of Enna was a military engagement between the Aghlabid Arabs and the Byzantines near Castrogiovanni. The Aghlabids raided Castrogiovanni and defeated a Byzantine army that came to meet them.

== Background ==
After the Aghlabid success at capturing Palermo in 831, their activity stopped for another 2 years. The Aghlabids were busy organizing their new city. The Byzantines never used this to act quickly. This time, the Aghlabids focused their military attention towards the city of Enna or Castrogiovanni. Early in 835, the governor of Palermo, Abu Fihr, personally led a raid against Enna and defeated a Byzantine force, which forced them to retreat behind fortifications. Later, Abu Fihr dispatched more raids towards Taormina. However, a conflict rose between Muslim ranks. Some of the raiders on their return to Palermo assassinated Abu Fihr and took refuge with the Byzantines. The Aghlabid emir, Ziyadat Allah I, quickly dispatched Al-Fadhl ibn Yaqub as the new governor of Sicily.

== Battle ==
In the summer of the same year, the new governor dispatched raids towards the center of Sicily. The Muslims targeted Enna this time. They began raiding the territory, which alarmed the Byzantine strategos. The Byzantine quickly marched out to meet them. They successfully drove back the Arabs and forced them to retreat towards the mountainous area, which was covered with thick bushes. The Byzantine strategos wasn't able to chase them due to fear of being ambushed. They decided to wait for the Arabs to come out. However, when the evening arrived, the Byzantines grew frustrated and tired, eventually deciding to retreat. Unexpectedly, the Arabs, leaping from the mountainous rocks, furiously charged the Byzantines, who were not expecting any attack. The Arabs routed them. The strategos was wounded. With several lance thrusts, he finally fell from his horse. The Arabs attempted to capture him, but the strategos' men valiantly defended him. The Arabs captured a great amount of weapons, horses, and cattle.

== Sources ==
- Warren Treadgold (1988), The Byzantine revival, 780–842.
- Vasiliev, Alexander A. (1935). Byzantium and the Arabs. Volume I, The Amorium dynasty (820–867) (in French).
- Amari, Michele (1854). Storia dei Musulmani di Sicilia, Vol I. (in Italian).
