= Alexios Mosele (Caesar) =

Byzantine aristocrat and general

Alexios Mosele (Ancient Greek: Ἀλέξιος Μωσηλέ) or Musele/Mousele (Μουσελέ) was a Byzantine aristocrat and general, chosen by Emperor Theophilos (r. 829–842) for a time as his heir, betrothed to his daughter Maria and raised to the supreme dignity of Caesar. He campaigned in the Balkans, recovering territory from the Slavs, and fought with some success in Sicily against the Arabs. Recalled to Constantinople on suspicion of plotting to usurp the throne, he was imprisoned but later pardoned and allowed to retire to a monastery, where he spent the remainder of his days.

== Biography ==
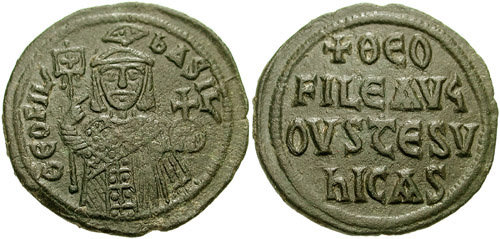
Copper follis minted in celebration of Emperor Theophilos' (r. 829–842) victories against the Arabs from circa 835 on.

Alexios was possibly the son or the grandson of the general Alexios Mosele, who had been active under Constantine VI (r. 780–797), although Byzantine chroniclers record that he was descended from the Krenites family. A brother named Theodosios, who held the high court title of patrikios, is also recorded.

Sometime between 838 and 839, Alexios was engaged to the princess Maria, Emperor Theophilos's youngest and favourite daughter, despite the fact that she was an infant. Theophilos had no male heir at the time, and this move was evidently intended as marking out Alexios as his heir apparent. He was progressively promoted to patrikios and anthypatos, then to magistros and eventually to Caesar. He was the only person known to have been promoted to the rank during Theophilos's reign, and may indeed have been raised to it as early as 831, when the presence of an unnamed Caesar is attested at an imperial triumph. Alternatively, it may be a reference to another, otherwise unknown, holder of the title, who probably died shortly after.

In summer 836, Mosele was dispatched with an army against the Bulgars in Thrace. Instead of confronting them, however, he focused on recovering for the Byzantine Empire the coastal strip between the rivers Nestos and Strymon, which had been abandoned to the local Slavs by the Byzantine-Bulgarian Treaty of 816. In this way, he restored the direct land connection between Thrace and Thessalonica, the Empire's major Balkan city. After founding a new city, named Caesaropolis after himself, he returned to Constantinople.

Alexios may have participated in Theophilos's successful campaign against Melitene in 837, as he is recorded to have participated in the triumph that followed the emperor's return. This, however, is disputed by some scholars. In 838, Mosele was sent on an expedition against the Arabs in Sicily. There, he achieved a number of successes, forcing the Arabs to raise their siege of Cephaloedium, and inflicted several defeats upon their forces. His forces, however, were insufficient to evict the Arabs altogether from their holdings in the western part of the island, and in late 838 he suffered a defeat at the hands of fresh Arab reinforcements.

In 842 he was accused by some Sicilians of colluding with the Arabs and planning to become emperor himself. To avoid forcing his Caesar into a corner, Theophilos sent Theodore Crithinus, Archbishop of Syracuse, to recall him under guarantees of personal safety. Nevertheless, upon his arrival in the capital, Alexios was stripped of his titles, beaten, and imprisoned. Theodore Crithinus publicly confronted the emperor for his breach of his word at the Church of St. Mary of Blachernae, but the enraged Theophilos had him beaten and exiled as well. Soon, however, the Patriarch John the Grammarian too publicly berated Theophilos. The emperor relented, released both Theodore and Alexios, and restored the latter to his rank and property.

His relations with the emperor, however, cooled considerably, particularly after the birth, in 840, of Theophilos's son, Michael III (r. 842–867). By 842, Mosele had retired to a monastery at the quarter of ta Anthemiou in Chrysopolis, which he himself had founded. Nothing is known of him thereafter.

== Sources ==
- Charanis, Peter (1963). The Armenians in the Byzantine Empire. Lisbon: Fundação Calouste Gulbenkian Armenian Library. OCLC 17186882.
- Kazhdan, Alexander, ed. (1991). The Oxford Dictionary of Byzantium. Oxford and New York: Oxford University Press. ISBN 0-19-504652-8.
- Treadgold, Warren (1988). The Byzantine Revival, 780–842. Stanford, California: Stanford University Press. ISBN 978-0-8047-1462-4.
- Lilie, Ralph-Johannes; Ludwig, Claudia; Pratsch, Thomas; Zielke, Beate (1999). "Alexios Musele (#195)". Prosopographie der mittelbyzantinischen Zeit: 1. Abteilung (641–867), Band 1: Aaron (# 1) – Georgios (# 2182) (in German). Berlin and Boston: De Gruyter. pp. 59–60. ISBN 978-3-11-015179-4.
