= Arsamosata =

Ancient city in Sophene on the Murat River

Coordinates: 38.6609°N 39.5109°E

Arsamosata (Middle Persian: *Aršāmšād, Old Persian: *Ṛšāma-šiyāti-, Ancient Greek: Ἀρσαμόσατα, Armenian: Արշամաշատ, romanized: Aršamašat) was an ancient and medieval city situated on the bank of the Murat River (called the Arsanias in classical sources), near the present-day city of Elazığ. It was founded in c. 240 BC by Arsames I, the Orontid king of Sophene, Commagene and possibly Armenia. The city served as a royal center and residence of the Orontids of Sophene. The origin of its name is Persian, meaning "Joy of Arsames". Naming cities such as the "joy of" or "happiness of" was an Orontid (and later Artaxiad) practice that recalled the Achaemenid royal discourse.

It was left and destroyed in the 1st century BC. In the Middle Ages, it was called Ashmushat. In Roman and Byzantine times, it bore the names Armosota (Ἀρμόσοτα) and Arsamosota (Ἀρσαμόσοτα). It was also known in Byzantine times as Asmosaton. It was called Shimshat in Arabic. A prominent native of Arsamosata was the 10th-century poet Abu'l-Hasan Ali al-Shimshati.

Arsamosata has been identified with the abandoned settlement site known as Haraba, located by the Murat River, near the east end of the Altınova plain, some 60 km east of Elazig,. Much of the site now lies submerged under the waters of the Keban Dam. The hill that served as the former city's citadel now juts out toward the northeast into a shallow lake created by the dam. The city itself appears to have been just below the hill on the southeast, although this is not entirely certain.

== History ==
Limited archaeological evidence, consisting of a few pottery finds that strongly resemble Urartian ceramics, point to the existence of a settlement at Arsamosata in ancient times—perhaps between the 10th and 7th centuries BCE. However, any settlement here was probably not very significant. The main Urartian settlement in the region was at Harput, which seems to have served as a fortified administrative center. Another large settlement existed at Norşuntepe, although it was unfortified during this period. The local population was at least partly Urartian; there may have also been members of the Mushki people present.

The ancient towns at Harput and Norşuntepe dispersed around the Achaemenid period. From then until the foundation of Arsamosata in the mid-3rd century BCE, the Altınova plain had no large towns. Arsamosata may have been founded as a display of prestige. Its original population was probably mostly drawn from the surrounding villages. Its location was probably chosen because its distance from the region's main route, which came through the Ergani pass to Tomisa further west, made it relatively safe from attack. However, being off the main trade route also meant that Arsamosata was not a major commercial center during this period. Its economy was mostly based on agriculture instead.

In late antiquity, Arsamosata formed one of the main settlements in the district of Anzitene. The nearby city of Dadima appears to have grown due to commerce from Ergani and Tomisa by the late 6th century, probably absorbing some of Arsamosata's population. However, Arsamosata remained a major city with a mixed population of Armenians and Assyrians.

Later, in the period after the Arab conquest, Dadima shrank to a small town, probably because it was close to the Arab-Byzantine border and therefore prone to attack. Many of its residents moved to Arsamosata, which was in a safer position further east. Some of Melitene's population probably moved to Arsamosata at this point as well. With Dadima's decline, Arsamosata was now the lone major city in the region.

However, despite its more secure position, Arsamosata still lay in a contested region and it changed hands several times during this period. A Byzantine offensive in 837 led by the emperor Theophilos captured Arsamosata along with Melitene. By autumn 938 the city was back under Arab control - the Hamdanid amir Sayf al-Dawla retreated toward Arsamosata that autumn while being pursued by Byzantine forces. In 939, according to James Howard-Johnston, Arsamosata fell to the Byzantines again. (Note: An alternate chronology, proposed by Canard, has Arsamosata surrendering to the Byzantines shortly after they took Melitene in 934, then being recaptured by the Arabs in 938, and finally coming under Byzantine control again in 944. Howard-Johnston argues against this, saying that John Kourkouas's siege of Theodosiopolis in 940 would not have made sense strategically unless Arsamosata had already been secured.)

After the Byzantine conquest, Arsamosata was made the capital of a small theme. (Note: This happened by 951–2, since the De administrando imperio - which was written that year - includes Arsamosata in its list of themes.) This theme probably only covered the immediately surrounding plains to the north and east; i.e. the easternmost part of Anzitene. In the 970s, the theme of Arsamosata was broken up. Arsamosata shrank to a medium-sized town and some of its population probably migrated to Harput, the new main capital of the region. A garrison was still kept at Arsamosata's citadel, but the town walls were probably now too big for the dwindling settlement within and must have fallen into disuse.

Arsamosata still existed under the Artukid principality of Harput, but it was no longer a major city. It survived until at least 1199, when its bishopric is last attested, and probably continued into the early 13th century as well. When Yaqut al-Hamawi visited Arsamosata in the early 13th century, he found it "in ruins, with only a tiny population". The citadel garrison was eventually withdrawn at some point, possibly after the Seljuk conquest of Anzitene in 1234, and Arsamosata was finally abandoned. Its population dispersed to villages on the surrounding plain and in the hills beyond. (Note: It's not clear if the people leaving Arsamosata founded new villages in the area or if they simply migrated to already existing ones.)

The name "Arsamosata" continued to be used until modern times, to denote a group of several villages near where the old city had once stood. As of the 20th century, there were seven of them, collectively known as "Arşimşat" (from the Arabic form of the city's name). The closest one to the old city was Haraba (from Arabic "kharaba", meaning "ruin"), about half a kilometer to the southwest of the ruins. A local tradition recorded around the turn of the 20th century held that there had once been a large city here, divided into two parts called "Samusat" and "Ashmushat".

Even before the construction of the Keban Dam, the city ruins (below the citadel) were already underwater due to the meandering of the Murat Su, and by the mid-20th century not much of them remained visible. However, one traveler reported seeing some khachkars here. Archaeologists conducted excavations at the citadel before the dam was built, in 1969, 1970, and 1973. They dug six trenches, mostly on the southeast side of the hill where walls were already visible.

== Bishopric ==
Arsamosata was historically the seat of a Syriac Orthodox bishop which was responsible for the entire surrounding district of Anzitene. Its last mention is in 1199.

No longer a residential bishopric, Arsamosata is today listed by the Catholic Church as a titular see.

== Sources ==
- Canepa, Matthew (2021). "Commagene Before and Beyond Antiochos I: Dynastic Identity, Topographies of Power and Persian Spectacular Religion". Common Dwelling Place of all the Gods: Commagene in its Local, Regional, and Global Context. Franz Steiner Verlag. pp. 71–103. ISBN 978-3515129251.
- Canepa, Matthew (2018). The Iranian Expanse: Transforming Royal Identity Through Architecture, Landscape, and the Built Environment, 550 BCE–642 CE. Oakland: University of California Press. ISBN 9780520379206.
- Marciak, Michał (2017). Sophene, Gordyene, and Adiabene: Three Regna Minora of Northern Mesopotamia Between East and West. BRILL. ISBN 9789004350724.
- Michels, Christoph (2021). "'Achaemenid' and 'Hellenistic' Strands of Representation in the Minor Kingdoms of Asia Minor". Common Dwelling Place of all the Gods: Commagene in its Local, Regional, and Global Context. Franz Steiner Verlag. pp. 475–496. ISBN 978-3515129251.
