= Theophilos (emperor) =

Byzantine emperor from 829 to 842

- Emperor and Autocrat of the Romans
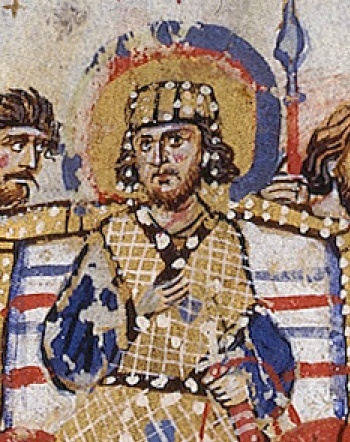
- Theophilus, in the Chronicle of John Skylitzes

Byzantine emperor
- Reign: 2 October 829 – January 842
- Coronation: 12 May 821 (as co-emperor)
- Predecessor: Michael II
- Successor: Michael III and Thekla (under the regency of Theodora)
- Co-emperor: Constantine (830s); Michael III (840–842)
- Born: c. late 812 – c. early 813; Constantinople, Byzantine Empire
- Died: 20 January 842; Constantinople, Byzantine Empire
- Spouse: Theodora (m. 830)
- Issue: Constantine; Thekla; Anna; Anastasia; Pulcheria; Maria; Michael III
- Dynasty: Amorian dynasty
- Father: Michael II
- Mother: Thekla
- Religion: Chalcedonian Christianity

Theophilos (Greek: Θεόφιλος, romanized: Theóphilos, sometimes Latinised as Theophilus; c. 812 – 20 January 842) was Byzantine Emperor from 829 until his death in 842. He was the second emperor of the Amorian dynasty and the last emperor to support iconoclasm.

Theophilos was well-educated in the imperial household. Upon his accession to the throne he faced the dual threat of the Abbasid Caliphate in Asia Minor and the Aghlabids in Sicily, and personally led armies against both foes from 831 onwards. He won fleeting victories but the retaliation of Caliph al-Mu'tasim (r. 833–842) was devastating, as was most humiliating in the Sack of Amorion in 838, the ancestral home of Theophilos's Amorian dynasty. Internal strife within the Caliphate allowed the Byzantines to recover. Theophilos engaged in many construction and renovation projects. One of his closest allies was the learned and cosmopolitan John the Grammarian, and they both improved relations with the Caliph and appreciated Arabic culture. He also secured nominal overlordship over the Principality of Serbia, uniting against their common enemy, the First Bulgarian Empire.

The military defeats to the Arabs inspired a more intensely iconoclastic policy than what Theophilos inherited from his father Michael II, and he persecuted many clerics for refusing to submit to the imperial will. After his death, his wife Theodora rescinded this policy but also defended his broader reputation. Accordingly the historical record preserves a picture of Theophilos as a just ruler and keen constructor and administrator, alongside rebukes of his iconoclasm.

== Biography ==
=== Early life ===
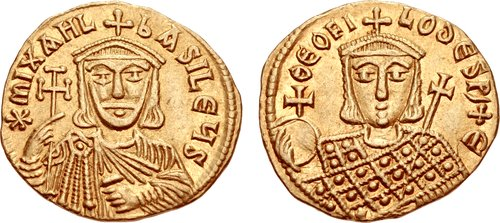
Theophilos on a coin of his father, Michael II, founder of the Amorian dynasty

Theophilos was born in late 812 or early 813, the son of Emperor Michael II and his wife Thekla, and the godson of Emperor Leo V the Armenian. Michael II crowned Theophilos co-emperor in 821. The date is almost universally given as 12 May 821 (Whitsunday), although this is not really corroborated by any source (another possible date is 24 March, Easter). Unlike his father, Theophilos received an extensive education from John Hylilas, the grammarian, and was a great admirer of music and art.

=== Accession to the throne ===
On 2 October 829, Theophilos succeeded his father as sole emperor. Theophilos continued in his predecessors' iconoclasm, though without his father's more conciliatory tone, issuing an edict in 832 forbidding the veneration of icons. He also saw himself as the champion of justice, which he served most ostentatiously by executing his father's co-conspirators against Leo V immediately after his accession.

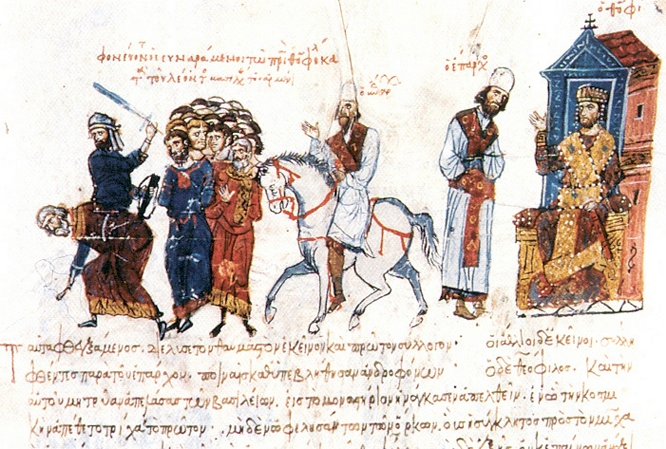
Theophilos ordering the urban prefect to execute his father's co-conspirators, who were involved in the murder of Leo V

=== Campaigns against the Arabs ===
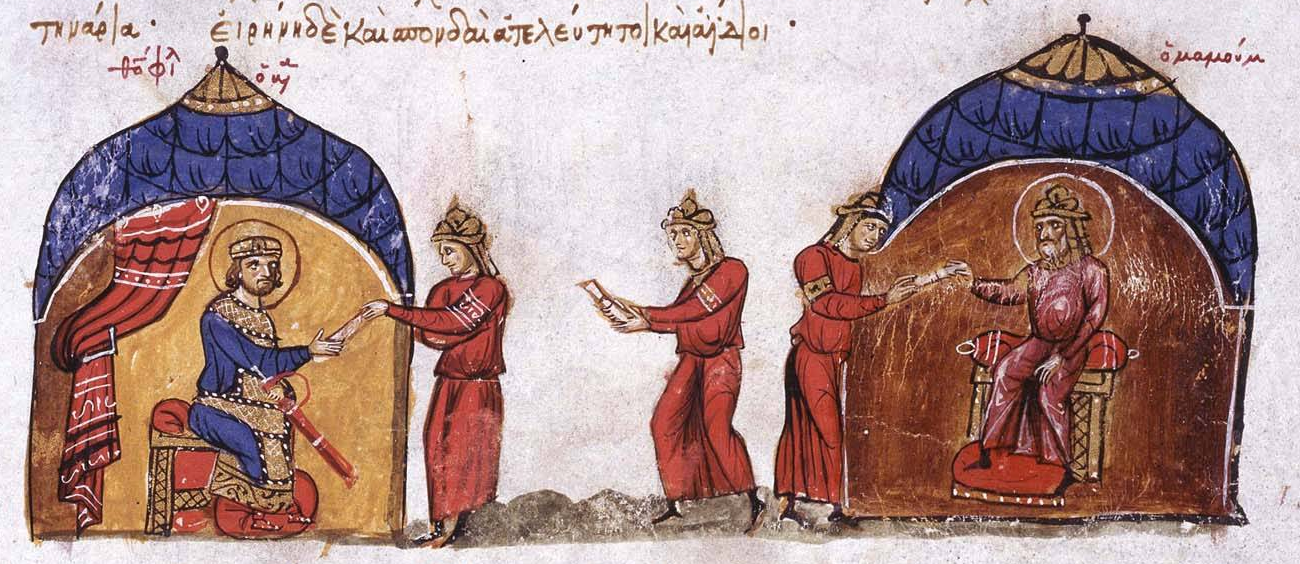
Abbasid Caliph al-Mamun sends an envoy to Emperor Theophilos.

At the time of his accession, Theophilos was obliged to wage wars against the Arabs on two fronts. Sicily was once again invaded by the Arabs, who took Palermo after a year-long siege in 831, established the Emirate of Sicily, and gradually continued to expand across the island. In 830, Abbasid Caliph al-Ma'mun (r. 813–833) invaded Cappadocia in response to Theophilos's attack on Mopsuestia and Tarsos, capturing the city of Tyana. In 831 Theophilos's forces intercepted and destroyed a large Abbasid raiding army at Charsianon, after which the Emperor invaded and pillaged Cilicia. These successes allowed Theophilos to celebrate his first triumph, but also prompted a major retaliatory Campaign by the Al-Ma'mun in 832, in which the Abbasids captured the major border fortress of Loulon, but in 833 they failed to seize Amorion. Another defeat in Cappadocia forced Theophilos to sue for peace (a one-off tribute of 100,000 gold dinars and the return of 7,000 prisoners), which he secured the next year, after the death of al-Ma'mun in 833. He was succeeded by his brother al-Mu'tasim (r. 833–842) who abandoned Tyana.

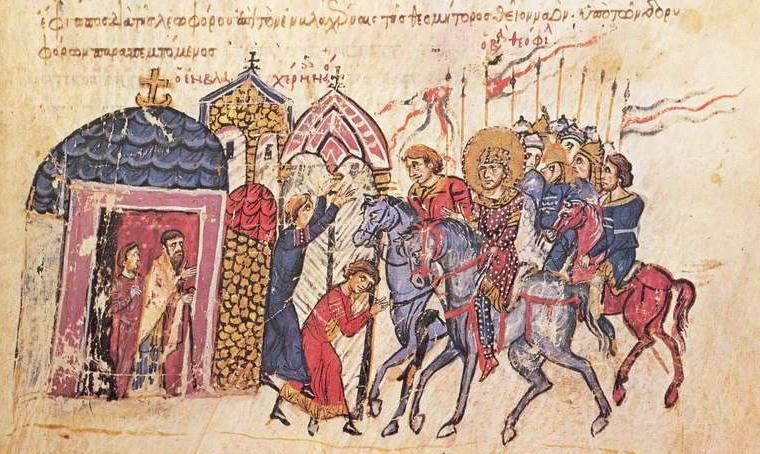
Theophilos celebrating a triumph through Constantinople

During the respite from the war against the Abbasids, Theophilos arranged for the abduction of the Byzantine captives settled north of the Danube by Krum of Bulgaria. The rescue operation was carried out with success in c. 836, and the peace between Bulgaria and the Byzantine Empire was quickly restored. However, it proved impossible to maintain peace in the East. In 834 Theophilos had given asylum to Khurramite refugees from the east; their leader was Nasr, a Persian who was baptized, changed his name to Theophobos, married the Emperor's aunt Irene and became one of his generals. As relations with the Abbasids deteriorated, Theophilos prepared for a new war.

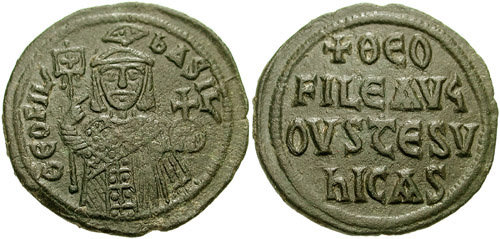
Follis of a new type, minted in large quantities in celebration of Theophilos's victories against the Arabs from c. 835 on. On the obverse he is represented in triumphal attire, wearing the toupha, and on the reverse the traditional acclamation "Theophilos Augustus, you conquer".

In 837, Theophilos led a vast army of 70,000 men towards Mesopotamia and captured Melitene, Arsamosata and Samosata. The Emperor also took and destroyed Sozopetra, which some sources claim as the birthplace of Caliph al-Mu'tasim. (Note: The claim that Sozopetra or Arsamosata was Mu'tasim's native city is found only in Byzantine sources. This claim is dismissed by most scholars as a later invention, i.e. as a parallel to Amorium, the likely birthplace of Theophilos. It was probably added deliberately to balance and lessen the effect of the blow that the latter's fall represented.) Theophilos returned to Constantinople in triumph. Eager for revenge, al-Mu'tasim assembled a vast army and launched a three-pronged invasion of Anatolia in 838. Theophilos decided to strike one division of the caliph's army before they could combine. On 21 July 838, at the Battle of Anzen in Dazimon, Theophilos personally led a Byzantine army of 25,000 to 40,000 men against the troops commanded by al-Afshin. Afshin withstood the Byzantine attack, counter-attacked, and won the battle. The Byzantine survivors fell back in disorder and did not interfere in the Caliph's continuing campaign.

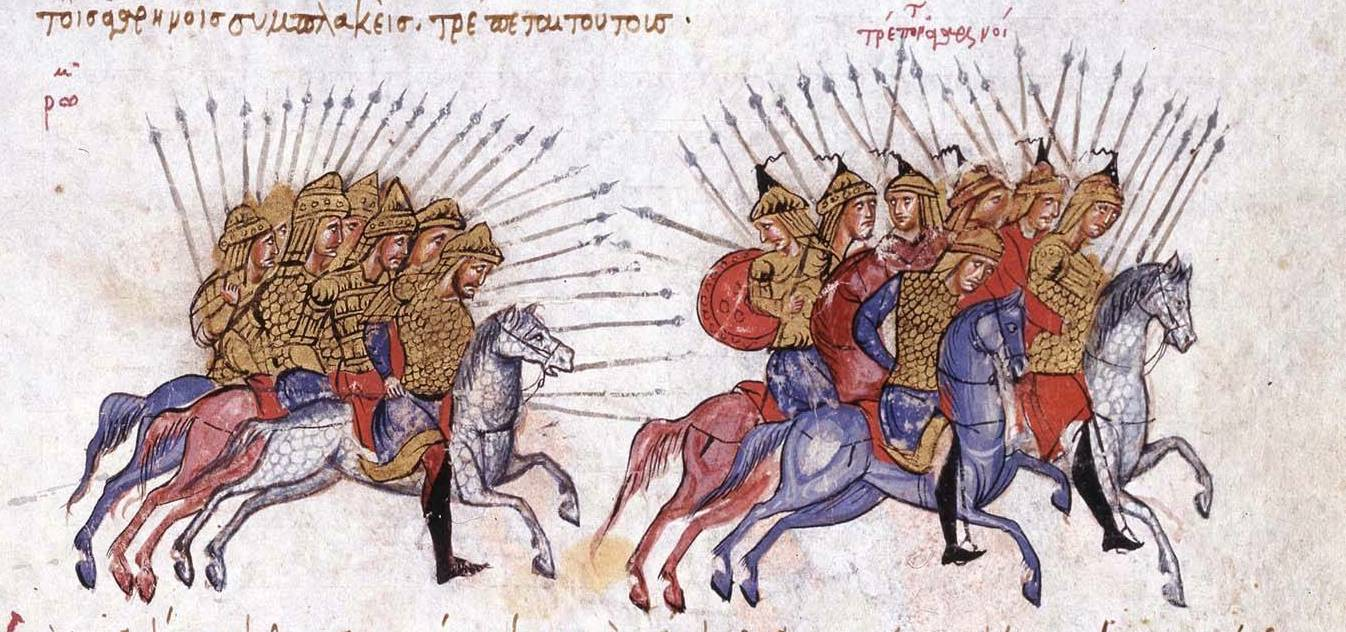
The Byzantines engaging the Arabs in Asia Minor

Al-Mu'tasim took Ancyra, and al-Afshin joined him there. The full Abbasid army advanced against Amorion, the ancestral home of the dynasty. Initially there was determined resistance. Then a Muslim captive escaped and informed the caliph where there was a section of the wall that had only a front façade. Al-Mu'tasim concentrated his bombardment on this section, and the wall was breached. Having heroically held for fifty-five days, the city fell to al-Mu'tasim on 12 or 15 August 838. Although the Caliph was soon forced to retreat to Abbasid territory to suppress an insurgency, the defeat was a major blow to Theophilos's resources and prestige, and numerous Byzantine prisoners were executed. The weakness of the Byzantine military was exposed, in particular by elite Turkic archers that the Caliph had recruited.

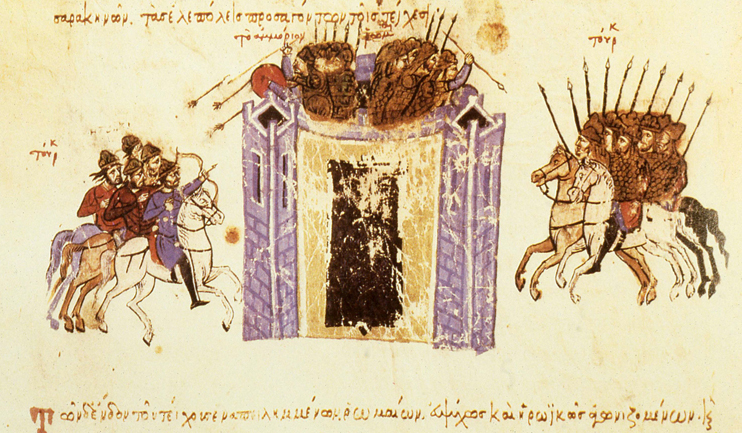
The Fall of Amorium to the Arabs in 838

Around 841, the Republic of Venice sent a fleet of 60 galleys (each carrying 200 men) to assist the Byzantines in driving the Arabs from Crotone, but it failed. During the campaign al-Mu'tasim discovered that some of his top generals were plotting against him. Many of these leading commanders were arrested and some executed before he arrived home. Al-Afshin seems not to have been involved in this, but he was detected in other intrigues and died in prison in the spring of 841. Al-Mu'tasim concluded a peace with Theophilos in 841. He fell sick in October and died on 5 January 842. The Sack of Amorion was the high point of Abbasid incursion past the Taurus Mountains, after which political strife within the Caliphate improved the Byzantine military situation.

=== Stabilisation ===
Despite major defeats at the hands of the Abbasids, the Byzantines consolidated and gained a degree of economic stability, and was no longer facing an existential threat. Theophilos was a keen builder and administrator; through the construction of lavish palaces and exchange of precious goods and manuscripts, he intended to rival the court at Baghdad, which was itself seeing a revival of Hellenic thought. Even as far as the streets of Guangzhou during the era of the Tang dynasty, the Arab-style kaftan was in fashion. In the tenth century, Liudprand of Cremona reported that Theophilos decorated the reception hall of the Magnaura with a throne and automata of lions and birds. Theophilos also repaired the Walls of Constantinople near the Blachernae district as well as large sections of the sea walls.

In 837, John the Grammarian returned from an embassy to Baghdad impressed by the architecture, and persuaded Theophilos to construct an "Abbasid"-style palace in Bryas near Chalcedon, which is now in ruins. Theophanes Continuatus relates John's instructions.

[John] persuaded [Theophanes] to build the palace of Bryas in imitation of Arab [palaces] and in no way differing from the latter either in form or decoration. The work was carried out according to John's instructions by a man named Patrikes who happened to be also adorned with the rank of patrikios. The only departure he made [from the Arab model] was that he built next to the bedchamber a church of our most holy lady, the Mother of God, and in the courtyard of the same palace a triconch church of great beauty and exceptional size, the middle part of which was dedicated to the archangel [Michael], while the lateral parts were dedicated to women martyrs.

This passage has been interpreted as either a report of cultural receptivity and Theophilos's taste for Islamic motifs or as an iconodule fabrication to depict Theophanes and Patriarch John as Muslim-sympathisers. However the overall account is not particularly polemical.

Theophilos also restructured and embellished sections of the Hagia Sophia and continued repairs of the urban fabric of Constantinople begun under Constantine V. The Hagia Sophia at Vize, Thrace is dated to his reign, and resembles the Hagia Irene of Constantinople. Theophanes Continuatus reports his construction of a home for former prostitutes, as well as of monasteries including the Monastery of Gastria and the St. Panteleimon Monastery. In the palatine precinct of the Great Palace of Constantinople, Theophilos constructed buildings sheathed in marble with bronze and silver doors, fountains, a decorated armoury, mosaics, terraces, porticoes and gardens.

In 838, in order to impress the Caliph in Baghdad, Theophilus had John the Grammarian distribute 36,000 nomismata to the citizens. In 839 or 840, he initiated diplomatic contact with the Umayyad Emirate of Córdoba. The name of his ambassador is somewhat garbled in the Arabic accounts of Ibn Hayyan, but it seems to have been the admiral Krateros. He was accompanied on his return by the Córdoban poet al-Ghazal, who signed a pact of friendship with Theophilos directed against the Abbasids.

When the Abbasids crushed the revolt of Babak Khorramdin in 838, many remaining Khurramite rebels fled to Byzantine territory and were accepted by Theophilos and placed under the command of Theophobos. They were called "Persians" by Byzantine chroniclers and proved valuable for the Empire which was experiencing a shortage of experienced soldiers at the time. However, after the Battle of Anzen, some Azerbaijani Khurramites withdrew to Sinope and proclaimed Theophobos emperor. By 840, Theophilos had threatened Theophobos and persuaded him into accepting a pardon. He then redistributed the Khurramite troops throughout the themes as garrison soldiers.

The persistent warfare had caused a serious manpower shortage, which Theophilos attempted to remedy by resettling defectors from the Caliphate into Asia Minor, and issuing an edict requiring Roman widows to marry barbarian immigrants, which was reported in the Life of Athanasia of Aegina. The discoveries of seals of the Byzantine ambassador to the Franks and Venice in Baltic trading settlements suggests that the Byzantines were attempting to recruit Scandinavians, who had recently appeared in the region of the Black Sea, as another means of addressing the manpower shortage.

=== Intensification of iconoclastic policies ===
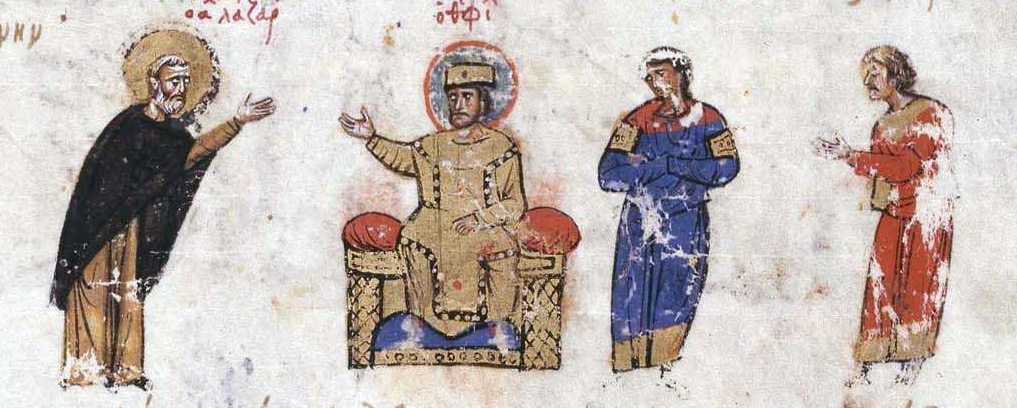
Theophilos argues with the iconophile monk Lazarus.

The capture of Palermo by the Arabs, Theophilos's defeat in Cappadocia in 832 and the discovery of a treasonous plot by iconodules in Constantinople likely pressured the Emperor into enacting an iconoclastic policy that was more severe than that of his father, which Theophilos had maintained from the beginning of his reign. He was supported by John the Grammarian, patriarchal synkellos (secretary) of Patriarch Antony I of Constantinople. Theophanes Continuatus reports that Theophilos forbade the painting of religious images and removed existing images, replacing them with secular images (e.g., of birds and animals), on similar grounds expressed in the Acts of the Council of Constantinople of 815. In 833, he persecuted iconodules who were not in communion with the Patriarch by ordering the seizing of the property of those who helped or sheltered them. However, the letter of Michael II to Carolingian Emperor Louis the Pious establishes that images that were not readily accessible and suspended high up in churches were permitted and commonplace.

Along with his severe iconoclastic policy, Theophilos persecuted numerous individuals for political and religious reasons, in a targeted and methodical way, however it does appear that he was more politically than religiously motivated overall. Euthymius of Sardis and Joseph the Confessor were arrested and beaten for distributing or writing pamphlets foretelling the death of the Emperor. Euthymius was elderly and died from his injuries, Joseph was imprisoned and their associate Theophilos of Ephesos was forced into hiding. The pamphlets were considered defamatory and thus treasonous. Nicetas the Patrician, distant relative of Empress Irene and former stratēgos of Sicily, was banished for refusing to take communion with the Patriarch in 830. The Palestinian monks Theodorus and Theophanes were said to be so defiant that verses describing their crimes were branded on their foreheads. Much of the persecution of iconodules was in effect punishment for challenging imperial authority rather than iconodulia as such. The abbot Methodios was publicly and provocatively opposed to the imperial policy, and was imprisoned and beaten for his disobedience. However perhaps through his connections to the imperial household or his alleged prophetic powers that may have awed Theophilos, Methodios became an associate of the Emperor. Tenth-century sources report that Theophilos's own wife, Theodora, and her mother maintained iconodulia, however there is no contemporary evidence of this.

The majority of the clergy did not revolt against imperial policy, including Joannicius the Great, who was criticised for his compliance by Theodore the Stoudite, and Ignatios, later Patriarch of Constantinople. Neither did Theophilos oppose all monasteries, although he used some to confine iconodule clerics, as did Emperor Leo V the Armenian.

Due to the unanimous iconodule sympathies of contemporary sources, it is difficult to determine the existence and extent of a popular iconoclast or iconodule tradition. It is likely that the changes in imperial policy in 787 and 815 only affected a small number of individuals and did not alter the religious practices of the whole population to a great degree. Theophilos's enforcement of iconoclasm may have served as an opportunistic means of asserting imperial authority, rather than a purely theological endeavour, but there is no reason to doubt that he was sincere in his iconoclastic convictions.

=== Relations with Bulgaria and Serbia ===
In 836, following the expiration of the 20-year peace treaty between the Empire and Bulgaria, Theophilos ravaged the Bulgarian frontier. The Bulgarians retaliated, and under the leadership of Isbul they reached Adrianople. At this time, if not earlier, the Bulgarians annexed Philippopolis and its environs. Khan Malamir died in 836.

The peace between the Serbs, Byzantine foederati, and the Bulgars lasted until 839. Vlastimir of Serbia united several tribes, and Theophilos granted the Serbs independence; Vlastimir acknowledged nominal overlordship of the Emperor. The annexation of western Macedonia by the Bulgars changed the political situation. Malamir or his successor may have seen a threat in the Serb consolidation and opted to subjugate them in the midst of the conquest of Slav lands. Another cause might have been that the Byzantines wanted to divert attention so that they could cope with the Slavic uprising in the Peloponnese, meaning they sent the Serbs to instigate the war. It is thought that the rapid extension of Bulgars over Slavs prompted the Serbs to unite into a state.

Khan Presian I (r. 836–852) invaded Serbian territory in 839 (see Bulgarian–Serbian Wars). The invasion led to a three-year war, in which Vlastimir was victorious; Presian was heavily defeated, made no territorial gains, and lost many of his men. The Serbs had a tactical advantage in the hills, and the Bulgars were driven out by the army of Vlastimir. The war ended with the death of Theophilos, which released Vlastimir from his obligations to the Byzantine Empire.

=== Death ===
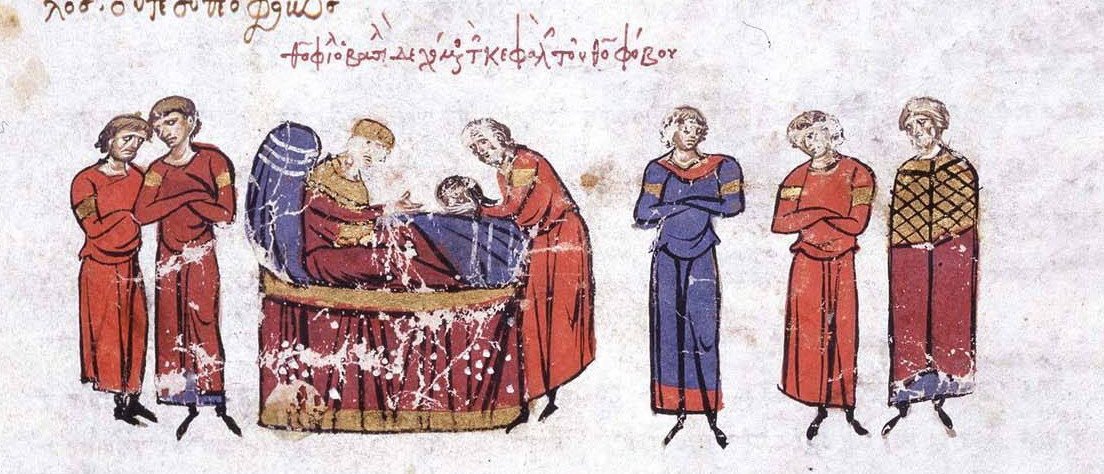
Theophilos receiving the head of the slain rebel Theophobos at his deathbed

As Theophilos's health was gradually failing in 842, he suspected that Theophobos would attempt a coup after his death, so he was invited to stay in the Great Palace of Constantinople. Immediately after Theophilos died on 20 January 842, his leading officers executed Theophobos.

== Assessment and legacy ==
Theophilos was the last iconoclast emperor of the Byzantine Empire, and his strict insistence on the removal of images and banning of the production of icons as reported by later sources represents a return to the spirit of Constantine V's Council of Hieria of 754. Theophilos was a more committed iconoclast than his father, Michael II, and so their relationship resembles that between Leo III the Isaurian and Constantine V, the renowned iconoclast emperors of the eighth century. In both cases, the father was a soldier of humble origins and the son brought up in the intellectually sophisticated environment of the imperial household. Theophilos's wife Theodora (r. 842–856) defended him, which mitigated the damnatio memoriae against him and his father Michael, nevertheless the later iconodule sources were highly critical of them.

Theophilos was successful in establishing his reputation as a just ruler, and even hostile anti-Amorian chronicles retain accounts of his justice. Like Emperor Leo V the Armenian, he was viewed as close to the people and eager to defend them against injustices committed by their officials. However, Theophilos's dealings with the Empire's enemies drew criticism, particularly due to the loss of the fortress of Loulon and the city of Tyana in raids led by Caliph al-Ma'mun from 830 to 832, and the Sack of Amorium by Caliph al-Mu'tasim in 838. Nevertheless, his reputation as a just ruler endured, as can be seen in the composition Timarion, in which Theophilos is featured as one of the judges in the Netherworld.

Theophilos was a much more active patron of construction and renovation than Leo V or Michael II. He strengthened the Walls of Constantinople including the sea walls, built the fortress of Sarkel on the Don river in Khazar territories, created the Cherson and Chaldian themes, and built a hospital, which continued to exist until the twilight of the Byzantine Empire. In fact, his name is mentioned in inscriptions on the Walls more often than any other emperor.

== Family ==
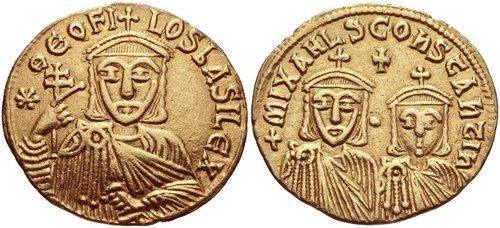
Solidus depicting Theophilos, with his father Michael II and his eldest son Constantine in the reverse. Like the Isaurians, Theophilos used coinage to insist upon dynastic rule and continuity.

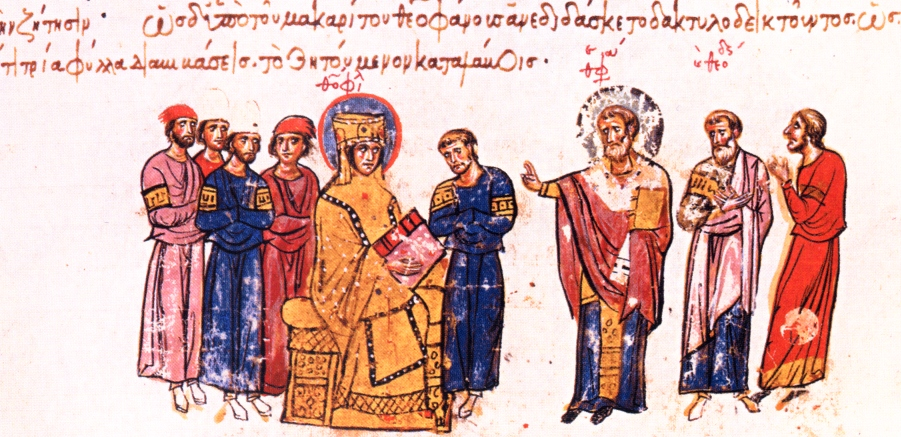
Theodora, the empress consort of Theophilos

On 5 June 830, the seventeen-year-old Theophilos married Theodora on the advice or command of his stepmother Euphrosyne. Theophilos and Theodora had seven children: two sons and five daughters. Euphrosyne retired to the Monastery of Gastria after her marriage. There she collaborated with Theodora to teach her daughters to venerate icons against the wishes of the iconoclast Theophilos. In 857, Emperor Michael III confined his mother Theodora and his sisters to Gastria where they became nuns.

- Thekla (c. 831 – after 867). Exiled to Gastria by her brother, Michael, but in 866 became the mistress of Emperor Basil I.
- Anna (b. c. 832).
- Anastasia (b. c. 833).
- Constantine (c. 834 – c. 835). He drowned in the cistern in Blachernae.
- Maria (c. 835 – c. 839). She was betrothed to the Caesar Alexios Mosele in 836.
- Pulcheria (c. 836 – c. 839).
- Michael III (840 – 867), who succeeded as emperor.

== See also ==
- List of Byzantine emperors

== Footnotes ==
Theophilos (emperor) Phrygian dynasty Born: 813 Died: 20 January 842
Regnal titles
Preceded by Michael II	Byzantine emperor 2 October 829 – 20 January 842	Succeeded by Michael III
Political offices
Preceded by Michael II in 821, then lapsed	Roman consul 830	Succeeded by Lapsed, Michael III in 843
