= Charsianon =

Medieval Byzantine district

Charsianon Χαρσιανόν, θέμα Χαρσιανοῦ
- Theme of the Byzantine Empire
- 863/873 – ca. 1072/3
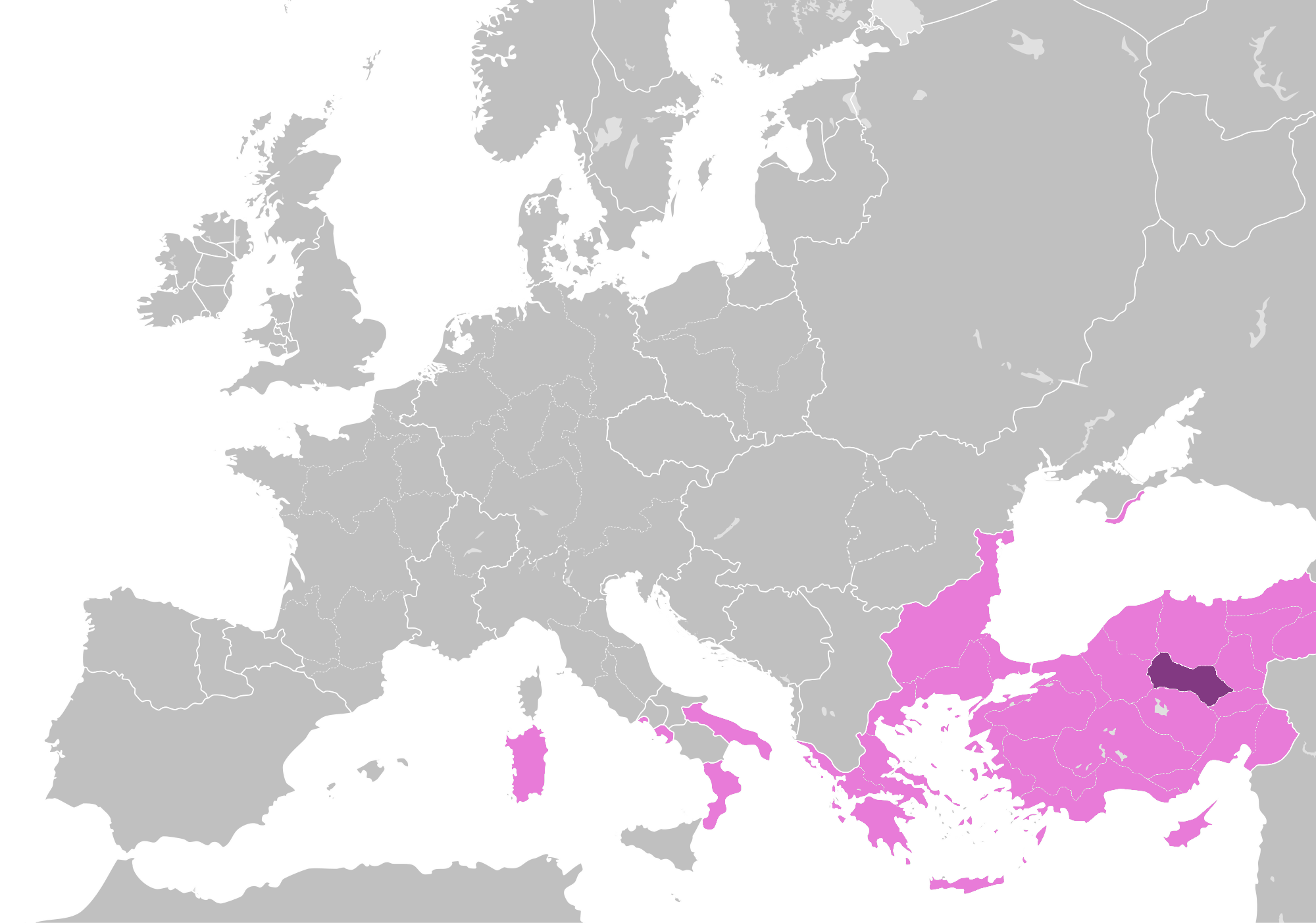
- Map of the Theme of Charsianon within the Byzantine Empire in 1000 AD.
- Capital: Charsianon (at first), Caesarea
- Area
  - Coordinates: 39.740217°N 35.836142°E
- Historical era: Middle Ages
  - Establishment as a theme: 863–873
  - Fall to the Seljuks: after ca. 1072/3

Charsianon (Greek: Χαρσιανόν) was the name of a Byzantine fortress and the corresponding theme (a military-civilian province) in the region of Cappadocia in eastern Anatolia (modern Turkey).

== History ==
The fortress of Charsianon (Greek: Χαρσιανόν κάστρον, Charsianon kastron; Arabic: Qal'e-i Ḥarsanōs) is first mentioned in 638, during the first wave of the Muslim conquests, and was allegedly named after a general of Justinian I named Charsios. The fortress is now identified with the ruins of Muşalikalesi (Muşali Kale of old) in the Akdağmadeni district in Yozgat Province.

The Arabs first seized it in 730, and it remained a hotly contested stronghold during the next century of Byzantine–Arab warfare. During the 8th century, it belonged to the Armeniac Theme and was the seat of a military and territorial district (tourma).

In the early 9th century, the fortress became the centre of a kleisoura, a separately administered fortified frontier district. Sometime between 863 and 873, it was raised to the status of a full theme, augmented by territory from the neighbouring Bucellarian, Armeniac and Cappadocian themes. It ranked in the middle tier of themes, with its governing strategos receiving an annual salary of 20 pounds of gold and commanding, according to Arab sources, 4,000 men and four fortresses.

In the 10th century, the theme of Charsianon became a major stronghold of the landed military aristocracy, with the great clans of Argyros and Maleinos having their homes and estates there. After 1045, a large number of Armenians, including the former king Gagik II (r. 1042–1045), were settled there, leading to friction with the local Greeks. The theme was lost to the Seljuk Turks following the Battle of Manzikert in 1071 and given to Danishmendids. Gagik II is attested as the last doux of Charsianon in 1072–1073.

== Sources ==
- Honigmann, Ernst (1935). Byzance et les Arabes, Tome III: Die Ostgrenze des Byzantinischen Reiches von 363 bis 1071 nach griechischen, arabischen, syrischen und armenischen Quellen. Corpus Bruxellense Historiae Byzantinae (in German). Brussels: Éditions de l'Institut de philologie et d'histoire orientales. OCLC 6934222.
- Kazhdan, Alexander, ed. (1991). The Oxford Dictionary of Byzantium. Oxford and New York: Oxford University Press. ISBN 0-19-504652-8.
- Leveniotis, Georgios Athanasios (2007). Η πολιτική κατάρρευση του Βυζαντίου στην Ανατολή: το ανατολικό σύνορο και η κεντρική Μικρά Ασία κατά το β' ήμισυ του 11ου αι [The Political Collapse of Byzantium in the East: The Eastern Frontier and Central Asia Minor During the Second Half of the 11th Century] (PhD thesis) (in Greek). Aristotle University of Thessaloniki. doi:10.12681/eadd/19246. hdl:10442/hedi/19246.
- McGeer, Eric; Nesbitt, John W.; Oikonomides, Nicolas, eds. (2001). Catalogue of Byzantine Seals at Dumbarton Oaks and in the Fogg Museum of Art, Volume 4: The East. Washington, District of Columbia: Dumbarton Oaks Research Library and Collection. ISBN 0-88402-282-X.
- Potache, Dejanira (1995). "Le thème et la forteresse, de Charsianon: recherches dans la région d'Akdagmadeni". In Ahrweiler, Hélène (ed.). Geographica Byzantina (in French). Paris: Éditions de la Sorbonne. doi:10.4000/books.psorbonne.2000. ISBN 9782859448325.
