= Henri Grégoire (historian) =

Clément Gustave Henri Grégoire (French: [ɑ̃ʁi ɡʁeɡwaʁ]; Huy, Belgium, 21 March 1881 – 28 September 1964, Brussels, Belgium) was an eminent scholar of the Byzantine Empire, virtually the founder of Byzantine studies in Belgium.

Grégoire spent most of his teaching career at the Université libre de Bruxelles. In 1904, he contributed to the Report of the Commission of Enquiry sent to investigate atrocities in the Congo Free State In 1918, during the German occupation of Belgium during World War I, he co-founded an underground newspaper entitled Le Flambeau with Anatol Mühlstein and Oscar Grosjean which continued publishing throughout the interwar years.

In 1938, he taught at the New School for Social Research and during the Second World War, joined the École libre des hautes études at the New School.

He was the editor of four journals—Byzantion, Nouvelle Clio, Annuaire de l'Institut de Philologie et d'Histoire Orientales et Slaves, and Flambeau—and published prolifically: by 1953 he had 575 titles in his bibliography.

Grégoire is especially remembered for his work on medieval epic poetry, notably Digenis Akritas.
