= Warren Treadgold =

American historian (born 1949)

Warren Templeton Treadgold (born April 30, 1949, Oxford, England) is an American historian and specialist in Byzantine studies. He is the National Endowment for the Humanities Professor of Byzantine Studies at Saint Louis University.

== Education ==
Treadgold holds an A.B. from Harvard University (1970) and a Ph.D. from the same university (1977). He wrote his A.B. thesis on Arianism as a force in politics, 429–586 under the guidance of Angeliki Laiou and Caroline Walker Bynum. The advisors of his Ph.D. thesis on The nature of the Bibliotheca of Photius were Ihor Ševčenko and Herbert Bloch.

== Academic career ==
He initially held a series of visiting lectureships and research fellowships: at the University of California, Los Angeles (1977–78), LMU Munich (1978–80), Stanford University (1980–82), and the Free University of Berlin (1982–83).

From 1983 to 1988, he was an assistant professor of history at Hillsdale College in Michigan. In 1988, he joined the Florida International University in Miami, where he was promoted to professor of history. He was a visiting fellow at All Souls College, Oxford in 1989 and a fellow at the Woodrow Wilson International Center for Scholars in 1996–1997. In 1997, he left Florida for Saint Louis University and has taught there since.

He is a member of the American Historical Association, the Society for Classical Studies, the Medieval Academy of America, and the American Association of University Professors.

His interest in the political, economic, military, social, and cultural history of the Byzantine Empire extends to the Byzantine historians themselves.

== Personal life ==
He is the son of Donald W. Treadgold, a Sovietologist, and Alva Treadgold. He has been married since 1982 to Irina Andreescu-Treadgold, an art historian.

He is a Roman Catholic and has been a Republican since at least 1988.

== Books ==
- The University We Need: Reforming America’s Higher Education (New York: Encounter Books, 2018);
- The Middle Byzantine Historians (New York: Palgrave Macmillan, 2013);
- The Early Byzantine Historians (New York: Palgrave Macmillan, 2007);
- A Concise History of Byzantium (New York: Palgrave Macmillan, 2001);
- Treadgold, Warren (1997). A History of the Byzantine State and Society. Stanford, California: Stanford University Press. ISBN 0-8047-2630-2.
- Byzantium and Its Army, 284–1081 (Stanford: Stanford University Press, 1995);
- Treadgold, Warren (1988). The Byzantine Revival, 780–842. Stanford, California: Stanford University Press. ISBN 978-0-8047-1462-4.

- The Byzantine State Finances in the Eighth and Ninth Centuries (New York: East European Monographs, 1982); and
- The Nature of the Bibliotheca of Photius (Washington, D.C.: Dumbarton Oaks, 1980).
