= 838 =

Calendar year

838 in various calendars
- Gregorian calendar: 838; DCCCXXXVIII
- Ab urbe condita: 1591
- Armenian calendar: 287; ԹՎ ՄՁԷ
- Assyrian calendar: 5588
- Balinese saka calendar: 759–760
- Bengali calendar: 244–245
- Berber calendar: 1788
- Buddhist calendar: 1382
- Burmese calendar: 200
- Byzantine calendar: 6346–6347
- Chinese calendar: 丁巳年 (Fire Snake); 3535 or 3328 — to — 戊午年 (Earth Horse); 3536 or 3329
- Coptic calendar: 554–555
- Discordian calendar: 2004
- Ethiopian calendar: 830–831
- Hebrew calendar: 4598–4599
- Hindu calendars
- Vikram Samvat: 894–895
- Shaka Samvat: 759–760
- Kali Yuga: 3938–3939
- Holocene calendar: 10838
- Iranian calendar: 216–217
- Islamic calendar: 223–224
- Japanese calendar: Jōwa 5 (承和５年)
- Javanese calendar: 734–736
- Julian calendar: 838; DCCCXXXVIII
- Korean calendar: 3171
- Minguo calendar: 1074 before ROC 民前1074年
- Nanakshahi calendar: −630
- Seleucid era: 1149/1150 AG
- Thai solar calendar: 1380–1381
- Tibetan calendar: མེ་མོ་སྦྲུལ་ལོ་ (female Fire-Snake); 964 or 583 or −189 — to — ས་ཕོ་རྟ་ལོ་ (male Earth-Horse); 965 or 584 or −188

Map of the Byzantine–Arab War (837–838)

Year 838 (DCCCXXXVIII) was a common year starting on Tuesday of the Julian calendar.

== Events ==
=== By place ===
==== Byzantine Empire ====
- July 22 – Battle of Anzen: Caliph al-Mu'tasim launches a major punitive expedition against the Byzantine Empire, targeting the two major Byzantine fortress cities of central Anatolia (Ancyra and Amorium). He mobilises a vast army (80,000 men) at Tarsus, which is divided into two main forces. The northern force, under commander al-Afshin, invades the Armeniac Theme from the region of Melitene, joining up with the forces of the city's emir, Umar al-Aqta. The southern, main force, under al-Mu'tasim, passes the Cilician Gates into Cappadocia. Emperor Theophilos attacks the Abbasids, inflicting 3,000 casualties, but is heavily defeated by a counter-attack of 10,000 Turkish mounted archers. Theophilos and his guard are encircled, and barely manage to break through and escape.
- August – Siege of Amorium: The Abbasids besiege the Byzantine fortress city of Amorium, which is protected by 44 towers, according to the contemporary geographer Ibn Khordadbeh. Both besiegers and besieged have many siege engines, and for several days both sides exchange missile fire. However, a Muslim prisoner defects to al-Mu'tasim, and informs him about a place in the wall which has been badly damaged by heavy rainfall. The Abbasids concentrate their hits on this section, and after two days manage to breach the city wall. After two weeks of repeated attacks, the Byzantine defenders surrender. The city is sacked and plundered, 70,000 inhabitants are slaughtered, and the survivors are sold as slaves.

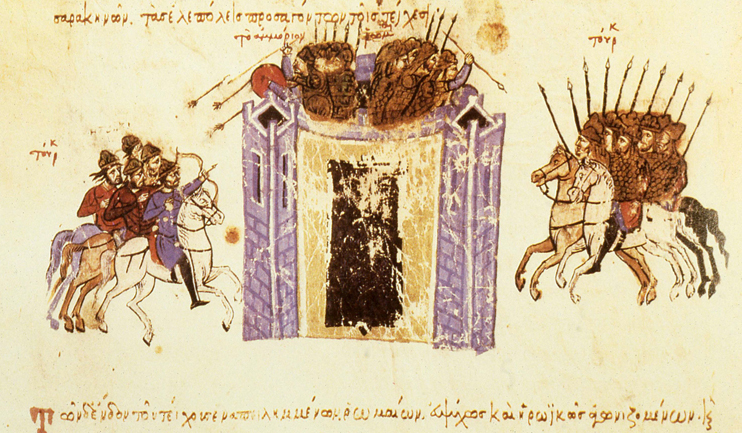
Miniature from the Madrid Skylitzes depicting the Arab siege of Amorium in 838

==== Europe ====
- December 13 – King Pepin I of Aquitaine dies after a 21-year reign. Emperor Louis the Pious appoints his youngest son Charles the Bald as his successor. The Aquitainian nobility, however, elects Pepin's son Pepin II as the new Frankish ruler.
- The oldest known mention is made of the city of Rheine, on the Ems River (modern Germany).

==== British Isles ====
- Battle of Hingston Down: Ecgberht, King of Wessex, leads his men to defeat a combined force of Cornish and Danish Vikings at Hingston Down in Cornwall.
- King Fedelmid mac Crimthainn of Munster calls for a great royal meeting at Kildare (Cluain-Conaire-Tommain) between himself and King Niall Caille of Uí Néill.
- Approximate date – The Stone of Destiny, an oblong block of red sandstone, is placed at Scone Palace for the coronation of the first monarchs of Scotland.

==== Abbasid Caliphate ====
- January – Babak Khorramdin, an Iranian military leader, is brutally executed by order of al-Mu'tasim.
- A conspiracy is discovered, led by General Ujayf ibn Anbasa, to assassinate al-Mu'tasim while he is campaigning, and place his nephew Al-Abbas ibn al-Ma'mun on the throne. A widespread purge of the army follows, which cements the leading role of the Turkish slave-soldiers (ghilman) in the Abbasid military establishment. Ujayf is executed and Al-Abbas put in prison, where he dies.
- The Yazidis rise up against the Abbasids (approximate date).

=== By topic ===
==== Religion ====
- Possible conversion of some Khazars to Judaism (approximate date).

== Births ==
- January – Ibn Khuzayma, Muslim hadith and scholar (d. 924)
- Æthelswith, Anglo-Saxon princess and queen consort (approximate date)
- Fujiwara no Takafuji, Japanese nobleman (d. 900)
- Ubaydallah ibn Abdallah, Muslim governor (approximate date)

== Deaths ==
- January – Babak Khorramdin, Iranian leader of the Khurramite uprising against the Abbasid Caliphate, executed
- May 4 ? – Willerich, bishop of Bremen
- June 10 – Ziyadat Allah I of Ifriqiya, Muslim emir
- November 6 – Li Yong, prince of the Tang dynasty
- December 13 – Pepin I of Aquitaine, king of Aquitaine (b. 797)
- Al-Abbas ibn al-Ma'mun, Muslim prince and general
- Boniface II, margrave of Tuscany (approximate date)
- Bran mac Fáeláin, king of Leinster (Ireland)
- Eadhun, bishop of Winchester
- Frederick of Utrecht, Frisian bishop (approximate date)
- Ralpacan, king of Tibet, murdered (approximate date)
- Ratimir, duke of Lower Pannonia
- Ujayf ibn Anbasa, Muslim general, executed
