= Malik ibn Kaydar =

Malik ibn Kaydar (Arabic: مالك بن كيدر; died 848) was a Sogdian military officer for the Abbasid Caliphate in the ninth century.

The son of Kaydar Nasr ibn Abdallah and brother of Muzaffar ibn Kaydar, Malik served under the Turkish general Ashinas during the Amorium campaign against the Byzantine Empire in 838, and he was responsible for pursuing and capturing a number of inhabitants of Ancyra who had fled from the Muslim army. In 839 Ashinas appointed him as resident governor of Egypt, and his administration there was praised by the fifteenth century chronicler Ibn Taghribirdi. After holding the governorship for a little over two years, he was dismissed by Ashinas in favor of Ali ibn Yahya al-Armani in 841. He died in Alexandria in 848.

== Notes ==
Preceded by Musa ibn Abi al-Abbas	Governor of Egypt; 839–841	Succeeded by Ali ibn Yahya al-Armani
