= 42 Martyrs of Amorium =

Byzantine officials executed by the Abbasids

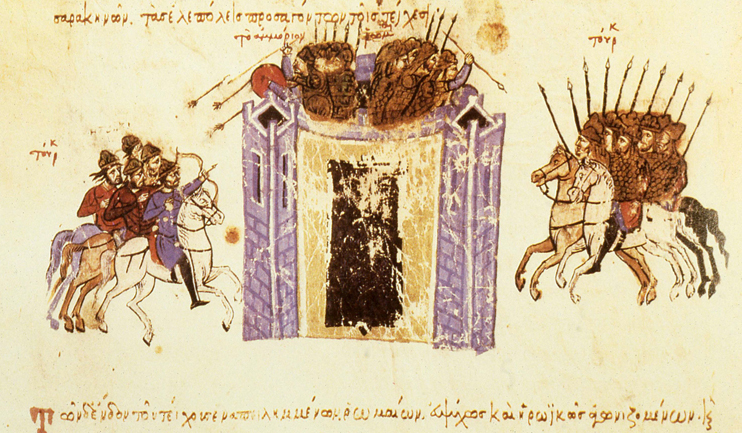
A depiction of the Sack of Amorium from the 12th century Madrid Skylitzes

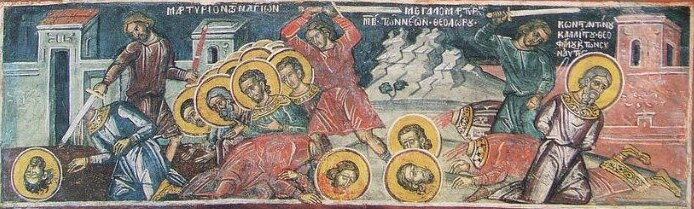

The 42 Martyrs of Amorium (Ancient Greek: οἰ ἅγιοι μβ′ μάρτυρες τοῦ Ἀμορίου) were a group of Byzantine senior officials taken prisoner by the Abbasid Caliphate in the Sack of Amorium in 838 and executed in 845, after they refused to convert to Islam. They are commemorated by the Roman Catholic Church and the Eastern Orthodox Church on March 6. Amorium is located at Hisar, Turkey.

== Events ==
In 838, the Abbasid caliph al-Mu'tasim (r. 833–842) led a major campaign against the Byzantine Empire that ended in the sack of the city of Amorium, the capital of the Anatolic Theme and birthplace of the reigning Byzantine Amorian dynasty.

Following the sack, 42 officers and notables of Amorium were taken as hostages to Samarra, then the capital of the Abbasid Caliphate. Repeated efforts by Emperor Theophilos and, after his death in 842, by Michael III and Empress-regent Theodora, to ransom them were rebuffed by the caliphs. After refusing to convert to Islam, all 42 were executed at Samarra on 6 March 845. Only a few of the 42 are known by name:

- Theodore Krateros, a court eunuch and possibly strategos (military governor) of the Bucellarian Theme, regarded as the leader of the 42 in the hagiographic texts.
- the patrikios Aetios, the strategos of the Anatolic Theme.
- the patrikios Theophilos, otherwise unknown.
- the magistros Constantine Baboutzikos, husband of Empress Theodora's sister and thereby apparently the highest-ranking of the prisoners. He was the first to be proposed to convert to Islam, and possibly also the first to be executed after refusing.
- Bassoes, identified as a "runner", otherwise unknown.
- Kallistos, possibly a member of the Melissenos family. An obscure patrikios and tourmarches (divisional commander) according to the chroniclers, he is given an extensive biography by the hagiographies, where he is portrayed as rising from imperial spatharios to komes of the Scholai regiment and finally doux of Koloneia, before being taken prisoner by Paulician soldiers under his command and delivered to the Abbasids, who placed him among the captives of Amorium.
- Constantine, secretary (notarios or hypographeus) of Constantine Baboutzikos.

== Hagiography and veneration ==
The hagiography of the 42 was written soon after their execution, by the monk Euodios, who used their fate and the sack of Amorium as an indictment of and proof of divine retribution against the re-adoption of Iconoclasm by Emperor Theophilos. Euodios' narrative mostly contains theological discussions between the steadfast prisoners and various people—Byzantine defectors, Muslim officials, etc.—sent to convince them to convert during their seven-year imprisonment. Their execution was then carried out by Ethiopian slaves on the banks of the Euphrates. Euodios' hagiography is the "last example of the genre of collective martyrdom", and was widely disseminated, with several variants of the legend of the 42 Martyrs appearing in later authors.

The feast day of the 42 Martyrs is on 6 March, the day of their execution. Pictorial representations of the 42 are rare in Byzantine art, unlike their analogues, the 40 Martyrs of Sebaste; when they are depicted, they are represented simply as a group of officials in court dress.

== Sources ==
- Foss, Clive (1991). "Amorion". In Kazhdan, Alexander (ed.). The Oxford Dictionary of Byzantium. Oxford and New York: Oxford University Press. pp. 79–80. ISBN 0-19-504652-8.
- Kazhdan, Alexander; Ševčenko, Nancy Patterson (1991). "Forty-Two Martyrs of Amorion". In Kazhdan, Alexander (ed.). The Oxford Dictionary of Byzantium. Oxford and New York: Oxford University Press. pp. 800–801. ISBN 0-19-504652-8.
- Lilie, Ralph-Johannes; Ludwig, Claudia; Pratsch, Thomas; Zielke, Beate (2013). Prosopographie der mittelbyzantinischen Zeit Online. Berlin-Brandenburgische Akademie der Wissenschaften. Nach Vorarbeiten F. Winkelmanns erstellt (in German). Berlin and Boston: De Gruyter.
