= Musa ibn Abi al-Abbas =

Musa ibn Abi al-Abbas (Arabic: موسى بن أبى العباس) was a governor of Egypt for the Abbasid Caliphate, from 834 until 839.

He received his appointment from the Turkish general Ashinas, who additionally granted him oversight over the provincial taxes on an intermittent basis. During his tenure in office Egypt was in a relatively quiet state, but at the same time the Inquisition officially remained in place. In his last years he was also forced to deal with a dispute with some of the residents of the Hawf district, which he at length settled.

Musa remained as governor until early 839, after a term of nearly five years, and was replaced by Malik ibn Kaydar.

== Notes ==
Preceded by Muzaffar ibn Kaydar	Governor of Egypt; 834–839	Succeeded by Malik ibn Kaydar
