= Blaise of Amorion =

Saint Blaise of Amorium (Greek: Βλάσιος ό Άμοριεύς) was a medieval monk from the Byzantine Empire. He was born in the mid-9th century in Amorion, Anatolic Theme. He studied in Constantinople and was ordained a deacon at Hagia Sophia. On a pilgrimage to Rome, he was taken captive and sold to "Scythians" (i.e. Bulgarians) by his travel companion. According to his "Vita", his buyer was a Bulgar nobleman, who released him in the hope that Blaise would stay and provide guidance in how to life a Christian life. He made his way to Rome, where he became a monk for 18 years, during which he became famous for his piety. He went back to Constantinople to escape his growing reputation of holiness and was welcomed in the Stoudios Monastery, and he later moved to Athos. He died in 908 on a visit to Constantinople.
