= Ujayf ibn Anbasa =

Abbasid military officer (died 838)

Ujayf ibn Anbasa عجيف بن عنبسة
- Native name: Ujayf, ibn Anbasa
- Born: unknown
- Died: 838 Abbasid Caliphate
- Allegiance: Abbasid Caliphate
- Branch: Abbasid army
- Conflicts: Battle of Bilal al-Dibabi, other Abbasid expeditions
- Children: unknown

Ujayf ibn Anbasa (Arabic: عجيف بن عنبسة) (died 838) was one of the senior-most military leaders of the Abbasid Caliphate under the caliphs al-Ma'mun and al-Mu'tasim.

== Biography ==
Nothing is known of his family, but he was probably of native Khurasani or Transoxianan origin. He appears in the early 9th century as a follower of the rebel governor Rafi ibn al-Layth, but quickly abandoned him along with most of the people of Fergana and Tashkent when Caliph Harun al-Rashid himself campaigned to Khurasan in 808. Ujayf probably belonged to the same social group as the other eastern Iranian generals who were later employed by al-Mu'tasim in his "Turkish" guard, and who were minor princes or drawn from the landed gentry (dihqans).

Under al-Ma'mun (r. 813–833), Ujayf became a distinguished general, campaigning in northern Persia and suppressing the Kharijite revolt of Bilal al-Dibabi in 829. Ujayf maintained his position under Mu'tasim, Ma'mun's half-brother and successor, campaigning against the Zutt in southern Iraq in 834, and leading a number of expeditions against the Byzantines in Asia Minor. Ujayf was one of the military leaders to receive cantonments for themselves and their troops at Mu'tasim's new capital at Samarra, and he was granted the revenue from the market of the town of Ishtikhan (near Samarkand) as a reward.

In 838, however, during Mu'tasim's great campaign against the Byzantine city of Amorium, Ujayf fell out with the caliph over the provisioning of the army; to this were added other perceived slights, and Ujayf and his followers began to conspire against the caliph. Ujayf was probably a leading member of a powerful group within the Abbasid military establishment that already back in 833 had opposed Mu'tasim's accession, and had favoured his nephew, Ma'mun's son al-Abbas. The agitation then had only subsided after Abbas himself swore allegiance to his uncle, but now a conspiracy was formed to kill Mu'tasim as well as his top Turkish commanders, al-Afshin and Ashinas. The plot was uncovered, however, and the ringleaders were arrested, with Ujayf being executed.

== Sources ==
- Bosworth, C. E. (2000). "ʿUd̲j̲ayf b. ʿAnbasa". In Bearman, P. J.; Bianquis, Th.; Bosworth, C. E.; van Donzel, E. & Heinrichs, W. P. (eds.). The Encyclopaedia of Islam, Second Edition. Volume X: T–U. Leiden: E. J. Brill. p. 778. ISBN 978-90-04-11211-7.
- Gordon, Matthew S. (2001). The Breaking of a Thousand Swords: A History of the Turkish Military of Samarra (A.H. 200–275/815–889 C.E.). Albany, New York: State University of New York Press. ISBN 0-7914-4795-2.
- Kennedy, Hugh (1986). The Early Abbasid Caliphate: A Political History. Taylor & Francis. ISBN 0-7099-3115-8.
