= Pissia =

Town and bishopric of ancient Phrygia

Coordinates: 38°15′29″N 31°32′34″E

Pissia (Ancient Greek: Πισσία) was a town and bishopric of ancient Phrygia.

Its site is located near Piribeyli, Yunak, Turkey.

Its bishop was suffragan of Amorium.
