= Sack of Amorium =

838 Abbasid capture of the Eastern Roman city of Amorium

Siege of Amorium
- Part of the Arab–Byzantine wars
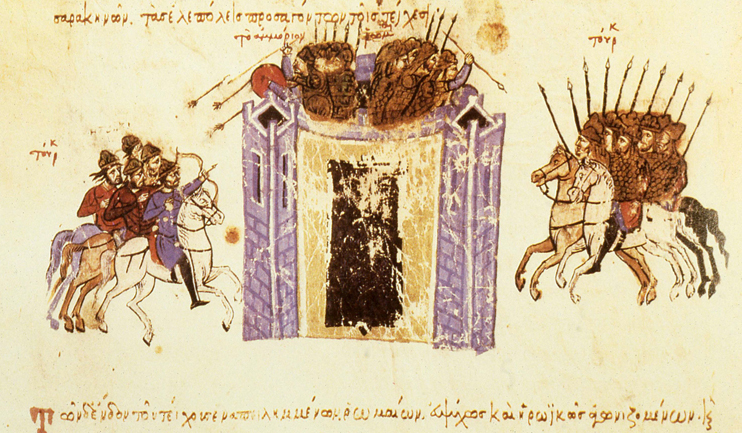
- Miniature from the 12th century Madrid Skylitzes depicting the Arab siege of Amorium
Date	August 838
Location	Amorium (modern-day Hisar, Emirdağ, Afyonkarahisar, Turkey) 39°1′21″N 31°17′42″E
Result	Abbasid victory: Razing of Amorium

Belligerents
Byzantine Empire	Abbasid Caliphate

Commanders and leaders
Emperor Theophilos; Theodore Krateros (executed) patrikios Aetios (executed); Kallistos (executed) magistros Constantine Baboutzikos (executed)	Caliph al-Mu'tasim; Afshin; Ashinas; Ja'far ibn Dinar al-Khayyat 'Ujayf ibn 'Anbasa; Bugha al-Kabir

Strength
c. 40,000 in the field army, c. 30,000 in Amorium	80,000

Casualties and losses
30,000–70,000 military and civilian dead	Unknown

The siege of Amorium by the Abbasid Caliphate in mid-August 838 was one of the major events in the long history of the Arab–Byzantine Wars. The Abbasid campaign was led personally by the Caliph al-Mu'tasim (r. 833–842), in retaliation to a virtually unopposed expedition launched by the Byzantine emperor Theophilos (r. 829–842) into the Caliphate's borderlands the previous year. Mu'tasim targeted Amorium, an Eastern Roman city in western Asia Minor, because it was the birthplace of the ruling Byzantine dynasty and, at the time, one of Byzantium's largest and most important cities. The caliph gathered an exceptionally large army, which he divided in two parts, which invaded from the northeast and the south. The northeastern army defeated the Byzantine forces under Theophilos at Anzen, allowing the Abbasids to penetrate deep into Byzantine Asia Minor and converge upon Ancyra, which they found abandoned. After sacking the city, they turned south to Amorium, where they arrived on 1 August. Faced with intrigues at Constantinople and the rebellion of the large Khurramite contingent of his army, Theophilos was unable to aid the city.

Amorium was strongly fortified and garrisoned, but a local inhabitant revealed a weak spot in the wall, where the Abbasids concentrated their attack, effecting a breach. Unable to break through the besieging army, Boiditzes, the commander of the breached section, privately attempted to negotiate with the Caliph without notifying his superiors. He concluded a local truce and left his post, which allowed the Arabs to take advantage, enter the city, and capture it. Amorium was systematically destroyed, never to recover its former prosperity. Many of its inhabitants were slaughtered, and the remainder driven off as slaves. Most of the survivors were released after a truce in 841, but prominent officials were taken to the caliph's capital of Samarra and executed years later.

The conquest of Amorium was not only a major military disaster and a heavy personal blow for Theophilos, but also a traumatic event for the Byzantines, its impact resonating in later literature. The siege did not ultimately alter the balance of power, which was slowly shifting in Byzantium's favour, but it thoroughly discredited the theological doctrine of Iconoclasm, ardently supported by Theophilos. As Iconoclasm relied heavily on military success for its legitimization, the fall of Amorium contributed decisively to its abandonment shortly after Theophilos's death in 842.

== Background ==
By 829, when the young emperor Theophilos ascended the Byzantine throne, the Byzantines and Arabs had been fighting on and off for almost two centuries. At this time, Arab attacks resumed both in the east, where after almost twenty years of peace due to the Abbasid civil war, Caliph al-Ma'mun (r. 813–833) launched several large-scale raids, and in the west, where the gradual Muslim conquest of Sicily was under way since 827. Theophilos was an ambitious man and also a convinced adherent of Byzantine Iconoclasm, which prohibited the depiction of divine figures and the veneration of icons. He sought to bolster his regime and support his religious policies by military success against the Abbasid Caliphate, the Empire's major antagonist.

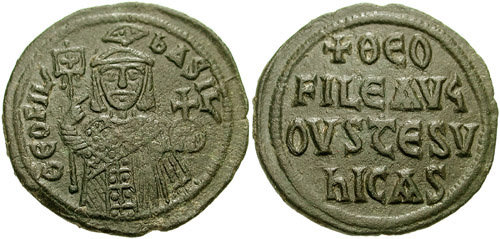
Follis of a new type, minted in large quantities in celebration of Theophilos's victories against the Arabs from ca. 835 on. On the obverse, he is represented in triumphal attire, wearing the toupha, and on the reverse the traditional acclamation "Theophilos Augustus, you conquer".

Seeking divine favour, and responding to iconophile plots against him, Theophilos reinstated active suppression of the iconophiles and other perceived "heretics" in June 833, including mass arrests and exiles, beatings and confiscations of property. In Byzantine eyes, God seemed indeed to reward this decision: al-Ma'mun died during the first stages of a new, large-scale invasion against Byzantium that was intended to be the first step in conquering Constantinople itself, and his brother and successor al-Mu'tasim withdrew to focus on internal matters, having trouble establishing his authority, and needing to confront the ongoing rebellion of the Khurramite religious sect under Babak Khorramdin. This allowed Theophilos to achieve a series of modest victories over the next few years, as well as to bolster his forces with some 14,000 Khurramite refugees under their leader Nasr, who was baptized a Christian and took the name Theophobos. The emperor's successes were not particularly spectacular, but coming after two decades of defeats and civil war under iconophile emperors, Theophilos felt justified in claiming them as vindication for his religious policy. Consequently, the emperor began to publicly associate himself with the memory of the militarily successful and fanatically iconoclast emperor Constantine V (r. 741–775), and issued a new type of the copper follis coin, minted in huge numbers, which portrayed him as the archetypical victorious Roman emperor.

In 837, Theophilos decided—at the urging of the hard-pressed Babak—to take advantage of the Caliphate's preoccupation with the suppression of the Khurramite revolt and lead a major campaign against the frontier emirates. He assembled a very large army, (Note: The reported armies for both Theophilos' 837 expedition and Mu'tasim's retaliatory campaign are of unusual size. Some scholars, like Bury and Treadgold, accept the figures of Tabari and Michael the Syrian as more or less accurate, but other modern researchers are sceptical of such numbers, as medieval field armies were rarely more than 10,000 men strong, and both Byzantine and Arab military treatises and accounts suggest that armies usually numbered around 4,000–5,000. Even during the phase of continuous Byzantine military expansion in the late 10th century, Byzantine military manuals mention armies of 25,000 as exceptionally large and fit to be led by the emperor in person. By way of comparison, the total nominal military forces available to Byzantium in the 9th century have been estimated at circa 100,000–120,000. For a detailed survey, see Whittow 1996, pp. 181–193 and Haldon 1999, pp. 101–103.) some 70,000 fighting men and 100,000 in total according to al-Tabari, and invaded Arab territory around the upper Euphrates almost unopposed. The Byzantines took the towns of Sozopetra and Arsamosata, ravaged and plundered the countryside, extracted ransom from several cities in exchange for not attacking them, and defeated a number of smaller Arab forces. While Theophilos returned home to celebrate a triumph and be acclaimed in the Hippodrome of Constantinople as the "incomparable champion", the refugees from Sozopetra began arriving at Mu'tasim's capital, Samarra. The caliphal court was outraged by the brutality and brazenness of the raids: not only had the Byzantines acted in open collusion with the Khurramite rebels, but during the sack of Sozopetra—which some sources claim as Mu'tasim's own birthplace (Note: The claim that Sozopetra or Arsamosata was Mu'tasim's native city is found only in Byzantine sources. This claim is dismissed by most scholars as a later invention, i.e. as a parallel to Amorium, the likely birthplace of Theophilos, and as a deliberate attempt to balance and lessen the impact of the latter's fall.)—all male prisoners were executed and the rest sold into slavery, and some captive women were raped by Theophilos's Khurramites. Theophilos's campaign was unable, however, to save Babak and his followers, who in late 837 were forced from their mountain strongholds by the general Afshin. Babak fled to Armenia, but was betrayed to the Abbasids and died of torture.

With the Khurramite threat over, the caliph began marshalling his forces for a reprisal campaign against Byzantium. A huge Arab army gathered at Tarsus; according to the most reliable account, that of Michael the Syrian, it numbered some 80,000 men with 30,000 servants and camp followers and 70,000 pack animals. Other writers give far larger numbers, ranging from 200,000 to 500,000 according to al-Mas'udi. Unlike earlier campaigns, which did not go far beyond attacking the forts of the frontier zone, this expedition was intended to penetrate deep into Asia Minor and exact vengeance. The great city of Amorium in particular was the intended prize. The Arab chronicles record that Mu'tasim asked his advisors to name the "most inaccessible and strongest" Byzantine fortress, and they named Amorium, "where no Muslim has gone since the appearance of Islam. It is the eye and foundation of Christendom; among the Byzantines, it is more famous than Constantinople". According to Byzantine sources, the caliph had the city's name written on the shields and banners of his soldiers. The capital of the powerful Anatolic Theme, the city was strategically located at the western edge of the Anatolian plateau and controlled the main southern route followed by the Arab invasions. At the time, Amorium was one of the largest cities in the Byzantine Empire, ranking in importance immediately after Constantinople. It was also the birthplace of Theophilos's father, Michael II the Amorian (r. 820–829), and perhaps of Theophilos himself. Due to its strategic importance, the city had been a frequent target of Arab attacks in the 7th and 8th centuries, and Mu'tasim's predecessor Ma'mun was said to be planning to attack the city when he died in 833.

== Opening stages of the campaign: Anzen and Ancyra ==
Map of the Byzantine and Arab campaigns in the years 837–838, showing Theophilos's raid into Upper Mesopotamia and Mu'tasim's retaliatory invasion of Asia Minor (Anatolia), culminating in the conquest of Amorium.

The Caliph's Amorium campaign followed immediately after the defeat and execution of Babak. The Amorium campaign against the Byzantines was led by the caliph himself. The caliph divided his force in two: a detachment of 10,000 horse-archers under Afshin was sent northeast to join forces with the emir of Malatya Umar al-Aqta and Armenian troops (the Artsruni and Bagratuni rulers of Vaspurakan and Taron respectively both participated in person in the campaign) and invade the Armeniac Theme from the Pass of Hadath, while the main army under the caliph himself would invade Cappadocia through the Cilician Gates. The advance guard of the latter was led by Ashinas, with Itakh commanding the right, Ja'far ibn Dinar al-Khayyat the left, and 'Ujayf ibn 'Anbasa the centre. The two forces would link up at Ancyra, before marching jointly on Amorium. On the Byzantine side, Theophilos was soon made aware of the caliph's intentions, and set out from Constantinople in early June. His army included men from the Anatolian and possibly also the European themes, the elite tagmata regiments, as well as the Khurramites. The Byzantines expected the Arab army to advance north to Ancyra after passing through the Cilician Gates and then to turn south toward Amorium, but it was also possible that the Arabs would march directly over the Cappadocian plain to Amorium. Although his generals advised evacuation of the city, with the intention of rendering the Arabs' campaign objective void and keeping the Byzantine army undivided, Theophilos decided to reinforce the city's garrison, with Aetios the strategos of the Anatolics, and men from the tagmata of the Excubitors and the Vigla.

With the rest of his army, Theophilos then marched to interpose himself between the Cilician Gates and Ancyra, camping on the north bank of the River Halys, close to one of the major river crossings. Ashinas crossed the Cilician Gates on 19 June, and the caliph himself with his main army set out on the march two days later. The Arab advance was slow and cautious. Anxious to avoid an ambush and learn the emperor's whereabouts, Mu'tasim forbade Ashinas to advance too deeply into Cappadocia. Ashinas sent out many scouting detachments to take captives, and from them finally learned of Theophilos's presence at the Halys, where he awaited the Arab approach to give battle. At the same time, around mid-July, Theophilos learned of the arrival of Afshin's army, comprising some 30,000 men, at the plain of Dazimon. Leaving a part of his army under a relative to watch the crossings of the Halys, Theophilos immediately departed with most of his army, some 40,000 men according to Michael the Syrian, to confront the smaller Arab force. Mu'tasim learned of Theophilos's departure from captives and tried to warn Afshin, but the emperor was faster and met Afshin's army in the Battle of Anzen on the plain of Dazimon on 22 July. Despite initial success, the Byzantine army broke and scattered, while Theophilos with his guard were encircled and barely managed to break through and escape.

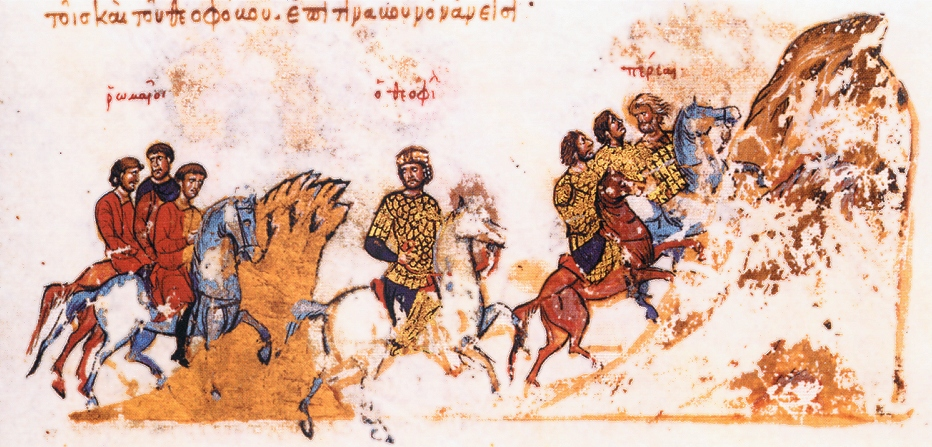
Emperor Theophilos flees after the Battle of Anzen, miniature from the Madrid Skylitzes manuscript.

Theophilos quickly began regrouping his forces and sent the general Theodore Krateros to Ancyra. Krateros found the city completely deserted, and was ordered to reinforce the garrison of Amorium instead. Theophilos himself was soon forced to return to Constantinople, where rumours of his death at Anzen had led to plots to declare a new emperor. At the same time, the Khurramites, gathered around Sinope, revolted, and declared their reluctant commander Theophobos emperor. Luckily for the Empire, Theophobos maintained a passive stance and made no move to confront Theophilos or join Mu'tasim. The caliph's vanguard under Ashinas reached Ancyra on 26 July. The inhabitants, who had sought refuge in some mines nearby, were discovered and taken captive after a brief struggle by an Arab detachment under Malik ibn Kaydar al-Safadi. The Byzantines, some of whom were soldiers who had fled from Anzen, informed the Arabs of Afshin's victory, after which Malik allowed all of them to go free. The other Arab forces arrived at Ancyra over the next days, and after plundering the deserted city, the united Arab army turned south towards Amorium.

== Siege and fall of Amorium ==
The Arab army marched in three separate corps, with Ashinas once again in front, the caliph in the middle, and Afshin bringing up the rear. Looting the countryside as they advanced, they arrived before Amorium seven days after their departure from Ancyra, and began their siege of the city on 1 August. Theophilos, anxious to prevent the city's fall, left Constantinople for Dorylaion, and from there sent an embassy to Mu'tasim. His envoys, who arrived shortly before or during the first days of the siege, offered assurances that the atrocities at Sozopetra had been against the emperor's orders, and further promised to help rebuild the city, to return all Muslim prisoners, and to pay a tribute. The caliph, however, not only refused to parley with the envoys, but detained them in his camp, so that they could observe the siege.

The city's fortifications were strong, with a wide moat and a thick wall protected by 44 towers, according to the contemporary geographer Ibn Khordadbeh. The caliph assigned each of his generals to a stretch of the walls. Both besiegers and besieged had many siege engines, and for three days both sides exchanged missile fire while Arab sappers tried to undermine the walls. According to Arab accounts, an Arab prisoner who had converted to Christianity defected back to the caliph, and informed him about a place in the wall which had been badly damaged by heavy rainfall and only hastily and superficially repaired due to the city commander's negligence. As a result, the Arabs concentrated their efforts on this section. The defenders tried to protect the wall by hanging wooden beams to absorb the shock of the siege engines, but they splintered, and after two days a breach was made. Immediately Aetios realized that the defence was compromised, and decided to try and break through the besieging army during the night and link up with Theophilos. He sent two messengers to the emperor, but both were captured by the Arabs and brought before the caliph. Both agreed to convert to Islam, and Mu'tasim, after giving them a rich reward, paraded them around the city walls in full view of Aetios and his troops. To prevent any sortie, the Arabs stepped up their vigilance, maintaining constant cavalry patrols even during the night.

The Arabs now launched repeated attacks on the breach, but the defenders held firm. At first, according to al-Tabari, catapults manned by four men each were placed on wheeled platforms, and mobile towers with ten men each were constructed and advanced to the edge of the moat, which they began to fill with sheep skins (from the animals they had brought along as food) filled with earth. However, the work was uneven due to the soldiers' fear of the Byzantine catapults, and Mu'tasim had to order earth to be thrown over the skins to pave the surface up to the wall itself. A tower was pushed over the filled moat, but became stuck midway and it and the other siege engines had to be abandoned and burned. Another attack on the next day, led by Ashinas, failed due to the narrowness of the breach, and Mu'tasim eventually ordered more catapults brought forward to widen it. The next day Afshin with his troops attacked the breach, and Itakh on the day after. The Byzantine defenders were gradually worn down by the constant assaults, and after about two weeks of siege (the date is variously interpreted as 12, 13, or 15 August by modern writers) Aetios sent an embassy under the city's bishop, offering to surrender Amorium in exchange for safe passage of the inhabitants and garrison, but Mu'tasim refused. The Byzantine commander Boiditzes, however, who was in charge of the breach section, decided to conduct direct negotiations with the caliph on his own, probably intending to betray his own post. He went to the Abbasid camp, leaving orders for his men in the breach to stand down until his return. While Boiditzes parleyed with the caliph, the Arabs came closer to the breach, and at a signal charged and broke into the city. Taken by surprise, the Byzantines' resistance was sporadic: some soldiers barricaded themselves in a monastery and were burned to death, while Aetios with his officers sought refuge in a tower before being forced to surrender.

The city was thoroughly sacked and plundered; according to the Arab accounts, the sale of the spoils went on for five days. The Byzantine chronicler Theophanes Continuatus mentions 70,000 dead, while the Arab al-Mas'udi records 30,000. The surviving population were divided as slaves among the army leaders, except for the city's military and civic leaders, who were reserved for the caliph's disposal. After allowing Theophilos's envoys to return to him with the news of Amorium's fall, Mu'tasim burned the city to the ground, with only the city walls surviving relatively intact. Among the spoils taken were the massive iron doors of the city, which al-Mu'tasim initially transported to Samarra, where they were installed at the entrance of his palace. From there they were taken, probably towards the end of the century, and installed at Raqqa, where they remained until 964, when the Hamdanid ruler Sayf al-Dawla had them removed and incorporated in the Bab al-Qinnasrin gate in his capital Aleppo.

== Aftermath ==
Immediately after the sack, rumours reached the caliph that Theophilos was advancing to attack him. Mu'tasim set out with his army a day's march along the road in the direction of Dorylaion, but encountered no sign of a Byzantine attack. According to al-Tabari, Mu'tasim now pondered extending his campaign to attack Constantinople, when news reached him of a conspiracy headed by his nephew, al-Abbas ibn al-Ma'mun. Mu'tasim was forced to cut short his campaign and return quickly to his realm, leaving intact the fortresses around Amorium as well as Theophilos and his army in Dorylaion. Taking the direct route from Amorium to the Cilician Gates, both the caliph's army and its prisoners suffered in the march through the arid countryside of central Anatolia. Some captives were so exhausted that they could not move and were executed, whereupon others found the opportunity to escape. In retaliation, Mu'tasim, after separating the most prominent among them, executed the rest, some 6,000 in number.

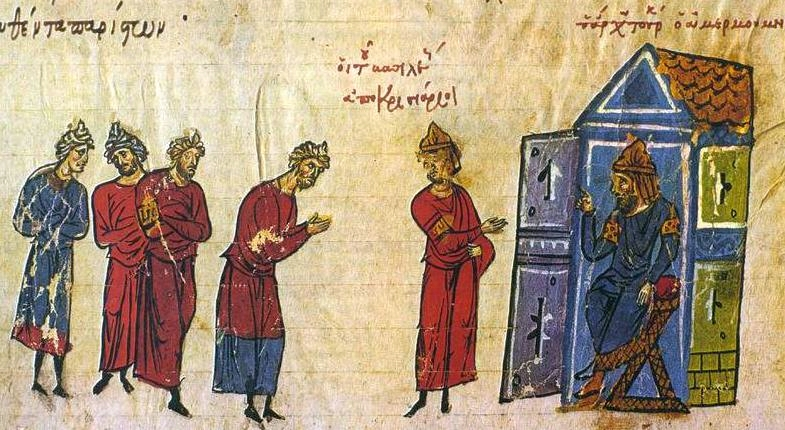
Miniature from the Madrid Skylitzes depicting the embassy of the tourmarches Basil to al-Mu'tasim (seated) after the fall of Amorium.

Theophilos now sent a second embassy to the caliph, headed by the tourmarches of Charsianon, Basil, bearing gifts and an apologetic letter, and offering to ransom the high-ranking prisoners for 20,000 Byzantine pounds (about 6,500 kg) of gold and to release all Arabs held captive by the Byzantines. In reply, Mu'tasim refused the ransom, saying that the expedition alone had cost him over 100,000 pounds, and demanded the surrender of Theophobos and the Domestic of the Schools, Manuel the Armenian, who had some years ago deserted from Arab service. The Byzantine ambassador refused to comply to this and indeed could not, as Theophobos was in revolt and Manuel had died, according to some accounts, from wounds received at Anzen. Instead, Basil handed over a second, much more threatening letter by Theophilos. Mu'tasim, angered by this, returned the emperor's gifts.

In the aftermath of the sack of Amorium, Theophilos sought the aid of other powers against the Abbasid threat: embassies were sent to both the western emperor Louis the Pious (r. 813–840) and to the court of Abd ar-Rahman II (r. 822–852), Emir of Córdoba. The Byzantine envoys were received with honours, but no help materialized. The Abbasids, however, did not follow up on their success. Warfare continued between the two empires with raids and counter-raids for several years, but after a few Byzantine successes a truce and possibly also a prisoner exchange—which excluded the high-ranking captives from Amorium—was agreed in 841. At the time of his death in 842, Mu'tasim was preparing yet another large-scale invasion, but the great fleet he had prepared to assault Constantinople perished in a storm off Cape Chelidonia a few months later. Following Mu'tasim's death, the Caliphate entered a prolonged period of unrest, and the Battle of Mauropotamos in 844 was the last major Abbasid–Byzantine engagement until the 850s.

Among the captured Byzantine magnates of Amorium, the strategos Aetios was executed soon after his capture, perhaps, as the historian Warren Treadgold suggests, in retaliation to Theophilos's second letter to the caliph. After years of captivity and no hope of ransom, the rest were urged to convert to Islam. When they refused, they were executed at Samarra on 6 March 845, and are celebrated in the Eastern Orthodox Church as the 42 Martyrs of Amorium. Several tales also sprung up around Boiditzes and his betrayal. According to the legend of the 42 Martyrs, he converted to Islam, but was nevertheless executed by the caliph alongside the other captives; unlike the others, however, whose bodies "miraculously" floated in the water of the river Tigris, his sank to the bottom.

== Impact ==
"A victory in honour of which the gates of heaven open and earth comes forth in her new garments.

O day of the battle of 'Ammūriya, (our) hopes have returned from you overflowing with honey-sweet milk;

You have left the fortunes of the sons of Islam in the ascendant, and the polytheists and the abode of polytheism in decline."

— Excerpt (lines 12–14) from Abu Tammam's Ode on the Conquest of Amorium.

The sack of Amorium was one of the most devastating events in the long history of Arab conquests into Anatolia. Theophilos reportedly fell ill soon after the city's fall, and although he recovered, his health remained in poor state until his death, three years later. Later Byzantine historians attribute his death before the age of thirty to his sorrow over the impact of the city's loss, although this is most likely a legend. The fall of Amorium inspired several legends and stories among the Byzantines, and can be traced in surviving literary works such as the Song of Armouris or the ballad Kastro tis Orias ("Castle of the Fair Maiden"). Arabs on the other hand celebrated the capture of Amorium, which became the subject of Abu Tammam's famous Ode on the Conquest of Amorium. (Note: For an English translation of Abu Tammam's poem, cf. Arberry 1965, pp. 50–62.) In addition, caliphal propaganda made use of the campaign to legitimize al-Mu'tasim's rule and justify his subsequent murder of his nephew and the rightful heir to al-Ma'mun, al-Abbas.

In reality, the campaign's military impact on Byzantium was limited: outside the garrison and population of Amorium itself, the Byzantine field army at Anzen seems to have suffered few casualties, and the revolt of the Khurramite corps was suppressed without bloodshed the next year and its soldiers reintegrated into the Byzantine army. Ancyra was quickly rebuilt and reoccupied, as was Amorium itself, although it never recovered its former glory and the seat of the Anatolic theme was for a time transferred to Polybotus. According to the assessment of Warren Treadgold, the imperial army's defeats at Anzen and Amorium were to a large degree the result of circumstance rather than actual incapability or inadequacy. In addition, the Byzantine campaign had suffered from Theophilos's overconfidence, both in his willingness to divide his forces in the face of greater Arab numbers and in his over-reliance on the Khurramites. Nevertheless, the defeat prompted Theophilos to undertake a major reorganization of his army, which included the establishment of new frontier commands and the dispersing of the Khurramite troops among the native troops of the themes.

The most long-term and long-lasting result of the fall of Amorium, however, was in the religious rather than in the military sphere. Iconoclasm was supposed to bring divine favour and assure military victory, but neither the army's weaknesses nor the reported treachery of Boiditzes could detract from the fact that this was "a humiliating disaster to match the worst defeats of any iconophile emperor" (Whittow), comparable in recent memory only to the crushing defeat suffered by Nikephoros I (r. 802–811) at Pliska. As Warren Treadgold writes, "the outcome did not exactly prove that Iconoclasm was wrong ... but it did rob the iconoclasts for all time of their most persuasive argument to the undecided, that Iconoclasm won battles". A little over a year after Theophilos's death, on 11 March 843, a synod restored the veneration of icons, and iconoclasm was declared heretical.

== Sources ==
- Arberry, A. J. (1965). Arabic Poetry: A Primer for Students. Cambridge: Cambridge University Press. LCCN 65011206. Archived from the original on 6 March 2024.
- Bury, John Bagnell (1912). A History of the Eastern Roman Empire from the Fall of Irene to the Accession of Basil I (A.D. 802–867). London: Macmillan and Company.
- Canard, M. (1960). "'Ammūriya". In Gibb, H. A. R.; Kramers, J. H.; Lévi-Provençal, E.; Schacht, J.; Lewis, B. & Pellat, Ch. (eds.). The Encyclopaedia of Islam, Second Edition. Volume I: A–B. Leiden: E. J. Brill. p. 449. doi:10.1163/1573-3912_islam_SIM_0629. OCLC 495469456.
- Christophilopoulou, Aikaterine (1993). Byzantine History, Volume II, from 610 to 867. Translated from Greek by Timothy Cullen. Amsterdam: A.M. Hakkert. ISBN 978-90-256-1044-9. Archived from the original on 6 March 2024.
- Haldon, John (1999). Warfare, State and Society in the Byzantine World, 565–1204. London: UCL Press. ISBN 1-85728-495-X.
- Ivison, Eric A. (2007). "Amorium in the Byzantine Dark Ages (seventh to ninth centuries)". In Henning, Joachim (ed.). Post-Roman Towns, Trade and Settlement in Europe and Byzantium, Vol. 2: Byzantium, Pliska, and the Balkans. Berlin and New York: Walter de Gruyter. pp. 25–59. ISBN 978-3-11-018358-0. Archived from the original on 6 March 2024.
- Kazhdan, Alexander, ed. (1991). The Oxford Dictionary of Byzantium. Oxford and New York: Oxford University Press. ISBN 0-19-504652-8.
- Kennedy, Hugh N. (2003). "Caliphs and Their Chroniclers in the Middle Abbasid Period (Third/Ninth Century)". In Robinson, Chase F. (ed.). Texts, Documents, and Artefacts: Islamic Studies in Honour of D.S. Richards. Leiden: BRILL. pp. 17–35. ISBN 90-04-12864-6. Archived from the original on 6 March 2024.
- Kiapidou, Irini-Sofia (28 April 2003). "Campaign of the Arabs in Asia Minor, 838". Encyclopedia of the Hellenic World, Asia Minor. Athens: Foundation of the Hellenic World. Archived from the original on 24 March 2016.
- Meinecke, Michael (1995). "al-Raḳḳa". In Bosworth, C. E.; van Donzel, E.; Heinrichs, W. P. & Lecomte, G. (eds.). The Encyclopaedia of Islam, Second Edition. Volume VIII: Ned–Sam. Leiden: E. J. Brill. pp. 410–414. doi:10.1163/1573-3912_islam_COM_0907. ISBN 978-90-04-09834-3.
- Rekaya, M. (1977). "Mise au point sur Théophobe et l'alliance de Babek avec Théophile (833/834-839/840)". Byzantion (in French). 44. Brussels: 43–67. ISSN 0378-2506.
- Treadgold, Warren (1988). The Byzantine Revival, 780–842. Stanford, California: Stanford University Press. ISBN 978-0-8047-1462-4.
- Vasiliev, Alexander A. (1935). Byzance et les Arabes, Tome I: La dynastie d'Amorium (820–867). Corpus Bruxellense Historiae Byzantinae (in French). Vol. 1. French ed.: Henri Grégoire, Marius Canard. Brussels: Éditions de l'Institut de philologie et d'histoire orientales.
- Whittow, Mark (1996). The Making of Byzantium, 600–1025. Berkeley and Los Angeles, California: University of California Press. ISBN 978-0-520-20496-6.
- Kennedy, Hugh (2001). The Armies of the Caliphs: Military and Society in the Early Islamic State. London and New York: Routledge. ISBN 0-415-25093-5.
- Kennedy, Hugh (2005). The Court of the Caliphs (Illustrated, reprint ed.). London: Phoenix. p. 326. ISBN 0753818965.
