= Muzaffar ibn Kaydar =

Muzaffar ibn Kaydar (Arabic: مظفر بن كيدر) was a ninth-century governor of Egypt for the Abbasid Caliphate.

== Career ==
Muzaffar was initially appointed to head the security (shurtah) of Egypt by his father Kaydar Nasr ibn 'Abdallah, after the latter was made governor of the province in 832. Following the death of Kaydar in the spring of 834, however, Muzaffar assumed the governorship himself. He immediately moved to put down a revolt, led by Yahya ibn al-Wazir al-Jarawi, which had broken out during his father's lifetime, and defeated the rebels in a battle near Tinnis. Al-Jarawi was captured and his followers dispersed, putting an end to the uprising.

According to the Egyptian chronicler al-Kindi, Muzaffar was the first governor of Egypt to recite the takbir during the Friday prayers. His activities regarding the mihnah, then underway in the provinces of the caliphate, are subject to debate; Ibn Taghribirdi reported that he tested the 'ulama' on the createdness of the Qur'an, but this may be a doublet of events that occurred during his father's governorship.

In the summer of 834, the Turkish general Ashinas was granted the oversight of Egypt by al-Mu'tasim, and his name was mentioned in the prayers throughout the province. Shortly after this, Muzaffar was dismissed as governor by Ashinas and replaced with Musa ibn Abi al-'Abbas. Following his dismissal, he departed from Egypt, and in 837 he is mentioned as an officer under al-Afshin during the war against Babak al-Khurrami.

== Notes ==
Preceded by Kaydar Nasr ibn 'Abdallah	Governor of Egypt; 834	Succeeded by Musa ibn Abi al-'Abbas
