= Piribeyli, Yunak =

Village in Yunak, Konya, Turkey

Piribeyli
- Neighbourhood
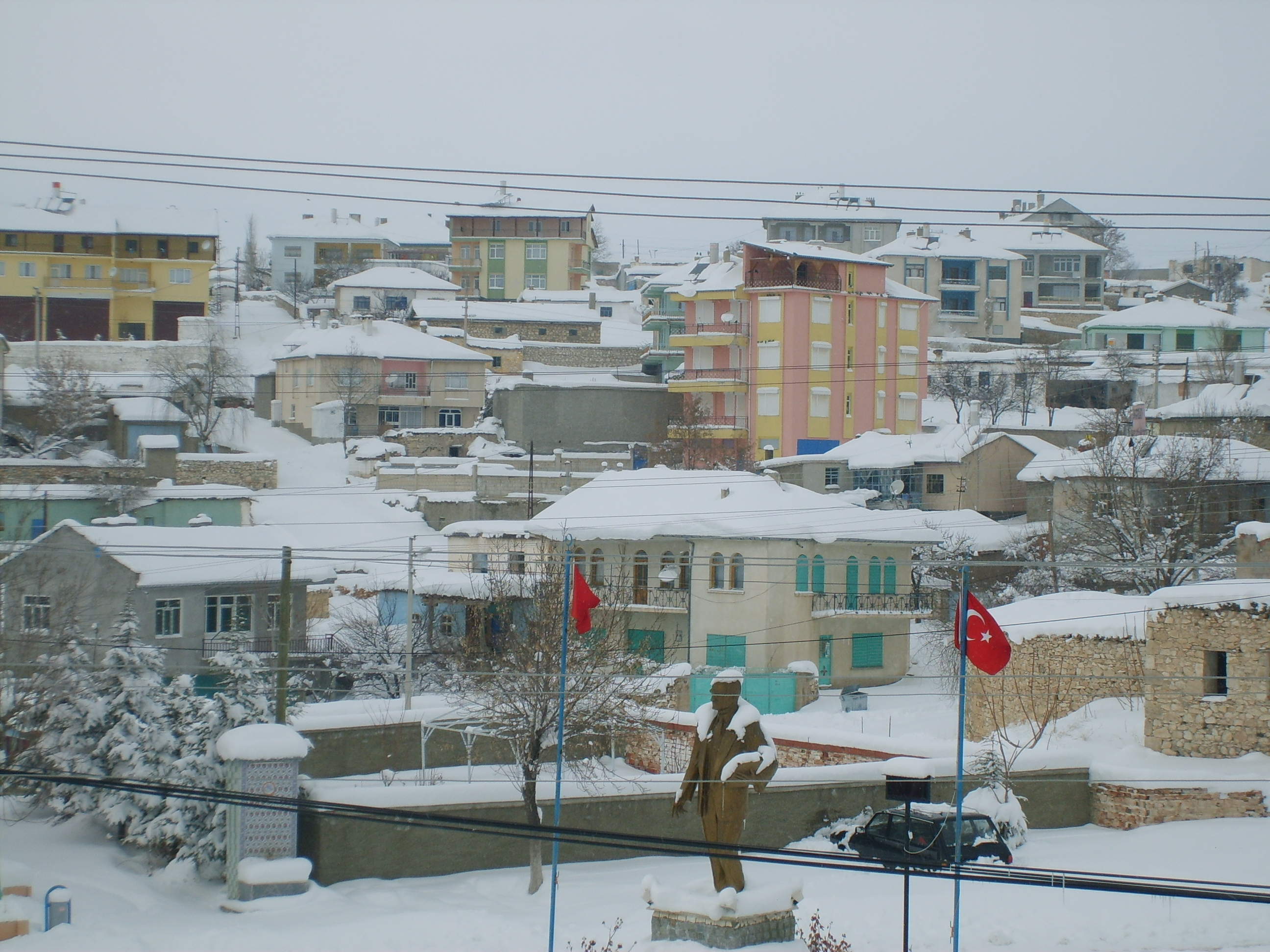
- Town square and Atatürk statue

- Location within Turkey Location within Turkey Central Anatolia
- Coordinates: 38°55′N 31°38′E
- Country: Turkey
- Province: Konya
- District: Yunak
- Population (2022): 1,022
- Time zone: UTC+3 (TRT)

Piribeyli is a neighbourhood of the municipality and district of Yunak, Konya Province, Turkey. Its population is 1,022 (2022). Before the 2013 reorganisation, it was a town (belde).

== History ==
Piribeyli was founded at the site of the old Pissia ruins by Kör Süleyman Bey, who came from Elazig Harput, about 300 years ago. Piribeyli, which was the education center where the Medrese-i Ilmiye school was located until the Republic period, was formerly connected to Konya vilayet and then to Turgut, Çeltik and Yunak districts respectively. In 1966 it passed from Afyon Province to Konya Province. In 1971 Piribeyli became a municipality. During the War of Independence, Although the Piribeyli was occupied by the Greek forces, it was taken back by the Mürettep division before Battle of Sakarya. the Azarıköy-Piribeyli Dekovil line was built around the village to prepare the army for the Great Offensive, Piribeyli played an important role due to its proximity to Akşehir HQ, the headquarters of the western front, and its strategic location, the people of the village have undertaken their permanent rule as ammunition transportation duties. There is a huge Atatürk statue in the town square symbolizing the struggle.

Atatürk's famous remark about the town of Piribeyli;

He calls out to Salih (Bozok); "Tell İsmet Pasha, you will bring the Mürettep Division to Piribeyli. The time is coming "

W. & A.K. Johnston. Anatolia. Piribeyli in 1911 maps.

=== History of the name Piribeyli ===
"Piribeyli", which means the lord of the Pirs, because it was the education center where the Madrasah-i Ilmiye school was located until the Republic era, and that these scholars were masters in their profession. The people of the region often called the village ''Pirlerin beyi'' it evolved and remained as Piribeyli.

== Origin ==
The people of Piribeyli are descendants of Karabag Turkmen lords (Kahyalar, Oğulları, Çakırlar, Aliağalar, Avcıoğulları) that are closely related to the Karluk and Oghuz Turks that came from Central Asia about a thousand years ago. They first established their settlements in Harput (now, Elazığ) and Atlantı in Eastern Anatolia. Afterwards they migrated to the steppes of Central Anatolia in the modern city of Konya. Some of them moved further to modern Emirdağ and established various settlements like Davulga (Tavulga) and some even moved further to the west.

=== Culture ===
The people managed to keep some of their Turkmen traditions that they inherited from their ancestors like molybdomancy (kurşun dökme) and kırk uçurma. Nowadays it's mostly based on Sunni Turkish traditions and the influence of European culture, mainly by the immigrants that frequently visit their village.

Before the modernization (pre-World War I) the people used to work more on the fields than now. Some of them even used to stay in traditional Turkic yurts (gers) in summer times.

=== Religion ===
Mostly Sunni muslims with an Alevi and Tengriist minority.

== Important places ==
In the Old Piribeyli Town Municipality Park, there are many ancient tomb steles, architectural pieces and pithoses from the Likaonian period and many tumuluses were found around Piribeyli. Former local people were Pissian citizens.

== Economic status ==
The main livelihood of the townspeople is farming and animal husbandry. The majority of the people work as guestworkers in Europe. 90% of the population live outside of the town since 2016.

== Population ==
Historical population
Year	Pop.	±% p.a.
1990	3,168	—
1997	2,771	−1.89%
2007	1,989	−3.26%
2012	1,348	−7.49%
2017	933	−7.10%
2022	1,022	+1.84%
Source: 1990 census, 1997 census and TÜIK (2007-2022)
