= Ali ibn Yahya al-Armani =

'Alī ibn Yaḥyā al-Armanī (Arabic: علي بن يحيى الأرمني) was a Muslim military commander of the mid-9th century, involved in the border warfare with the Byzantine Empire. He served as governor of Tarsus from ca. 852 until 862, leading several expeditions against the Byzantines. In 862 he was appointed governor of his native Armenia, but was killed in autumn 863 fighting against the Byzantines.

== Life ==
Map of the Byzantine-Arab frontier zone in southeastern Asia Minor, with the major fortresses

As his nisba indicates, Ali was of Armenian descent. In 840, he was sent to Egypt as its governor, replacing Malik ibn Kaydur. Later he was named commander (wali or amir) of the Abbasid Caliphate's borderlands in Cilicia (the al-thughur ash-Sha'miya), confronting the Byzantine Empire, with Tarsus as his base. He is the first amir of Tarsus known to have exercised broadly autonomous authority there, taking advantage of the decline in the power of the Abbasid Caliphate's central government. Ali held the post at least from 238 A.H. (852/3 CE) until October/November 862. As amir of the borderlands, Ali undertook several summer raiding expeditions (ṣawāʿif) over the Taurus Mountains into Byzantine-held Anatolia: summer raids led by Ali are recorded for the years 852/3, 853/4, 859/60 and 860/1, while he was also present at the prisoner exchange of 856.

In October/November 862 he was appointed governor of Armenia and Adharbayjan, and in October/November of the next year, he was killed in battle with the Byzantines along with 400 of his men. Coming on the heels of the death of the emir of Malatya, Umar al-Aqta, at the Battle of Lalakaon in September, the news of Ali's death provoked riots among the populace in Baghdad, Samarra and other cities, who were angry at the government's impotence.

Ali's son Muhammad later also served as amir of Tarsus, from 871/2 to 872/3 or 873/4. According to the 10th-century account of al-Mas'udi (The Meadows of Gold, VIII.74–75) his reputation was such that he was among the "illustrious Muslims" whose portraits were displayed in Byzantine churches in recognition of their valour.

== Sources ==
- Canard, Marius; Cahen, Claude & Deny, J. (1960). "Armīniya". In Gibb, H. A. R.; Kramers, J. H.; Lévi-Provençal, E.; Schacht, J.; Lewis, B. & Pellat, Ch. (eds.). The Encyclopaedia of Islam, Second Edition. Volume I: A–B. Leiden: E. J. Brill. pp. 636–650. OCLC 495469456.
- Gordon, Matthew S. (2001). The Breaking of a Thousand Swords: A History of the Turkish Military of Samarra (A.H. 200–275/815–889 C.E.). Albany, New York: State University of New York Press. ISBN 0-7914-4795-2.
- Hild, Friedrich; Hellenkemper, Hansgerd (1990). Tabula Imperii Byzantini, Band 5: Kilikien und Isaurien (in German). Vienna: Verlag der Österreichischen Akademie der Wissenschaften. ISBN 978-3-7001-1811-4.
- Saliba, George, ed. (1985). The History of al-Ṭabarī, Volume XXXV: The Crisis of the ʿAbbāsid Caliphate: The Caliphates of al-Mustaʿīn and al-Muʿtazz, A.D. 862–869/A.H. 248–255. SUNY Series in Near Eastern Studies. Albany, New York: State University of New York Press. ISBN 978-0-87395-883-7.
- Stern, S. M. (1960). "The Coins of Thamal and of Other Governors of Tarsus". Journal of the American Oriental Society. 80 (3): 217–225. doi:10.2307/596170. JSTOR 596170.

Preceded by Malik ibn Kaydar	Governor of Egypt; 841–843	Succeeded by Isa ibn Mansur al-Rafi'i
Preceded by Hatim ibn Harthamah ibn al-Nadr	Governor of Egypt; 849–850	Succeeded by Ishaq ibn Yahya ibn Mu'adh
Unknown Title last held by Nasr ibn Hamza al-Khuza'i	Governor of Tarsus by 852/3 – October/November 862	Unknown Title next held by Muhammad ibn Harun al-Taghlibi
