= Cedreae =

Town of ancient Caria

Coordinates: 36°59′30″N 28°12′21″E

Cedreae or Kedreai (Ancient Greek: Κεδρεαί), also known as Cedreiae or Kedreiai (Κεδρειαί), was a city of ancient Caria, mentioned by Stephanus of Byzantium Lysander took the place, it being in alliance with the Athenians. The inhabitants were mixobarbaroi (μιξοβάρβαροι), a mixture of Greeks and barbarians. It was a member of the Delian League since it appears in tribute records of Athens between the years 454/3 and 415/4 BCE. At some point during the Hellenistic era, it became part of the Rhodian Peraea and emerged as one of the key Rhodian demes.

Near the summit was a Doric temple, likely dedicated to Apollo, though only its foundations remain. It was built on a terraced platform supported by a solid wall. Later, the site was used for a Christian church.

Archaeological findings include a theater and an agora. On the mainland opposite the island is a sizable necropolis featuring constructed tombs and sarcophagi.

Its site is located near Şehir Adaları, Muğla Province, Turkey.
