= Al-Abbas ibn al-Ma'mun =

Abbasid prince and Military leader (died 838 CE)

Al-Abbas ibn al-Ma'mun العباس إبن المأمون
- Died: 838
- Burial: Manbij
Names
- Al-Abbas ibn Abdallah al-Ma'mun ibn Harun al-Rashid ibn Muhammad al-Mahdi ibn Abdallah al-Mansur
- Dynasty: Abbasid
- Father: al-Ma'mun
- Mother: Sundus
- Religion: Sunni Islam
- Military career
- Relatives: al-Amin (uncle) al-Mu'tasim (uncle) al-Qasim (uncle)
- Allegiance: Abbasid Caliphate
- Branch: Abbasid army
- Service years: c. 828–838
- Conflicts: Arab–Byzantine wars

Al-Abbas ibn al-Ma'mun (Arabic: العباس بن المأمون) (died 838 CE) was an Abbasid prince and general, the son of the Abbasid caliph al-Ma'mun (r. 813–833). A distinguished military leader in the Arab–Byzantine wars, he was passed over in the succession in favour of his uncle al-Mu'tasim (r. 833–842). In 838, he was arrested for his involvement in a failed conspiracy against al-Mu'tasim, and died in prison.

== Biography ==
Abbas was the son of al-Ma'mun by the concubine Sundus. In 828–829, al-Ma'mun appointed him as governor of Upper Mesopotamia and the Mesopotamian military frontier zone (thughur) with the Byzantine Empire. Abbas distinguished himself in the expeditions against the Byzantines for his bravery. In the summer of 830, Abbas led an expedition against the Khurramite rebels of Babak Khorramdin in Azerbaijan. The campaign was accompanied by a contingent of Byzantine captives under the renegade general Manuel the Armenian, who, given Abbas's relative inexperience, may have been the actual commander of the army. Abbas's force met with some success against the Khurramites, and began its return. As it passed near the Byzantine frontier at Hadath, Manuel, having earned the confidence of Abbas and his Arab officers, persuaded Abbas to cross the nearby passes and raid Byzantine territory. Once there, Manuel took advantage of a hunt to disarm Abbas and his entourage and defect back to the Empire, along with some of the other Byzantine captives. Abbas with his men were left behind and after rejoining their army, they retreated back over the mountains into the Caliphate.

Map of Byzantine Asia Minor and the Byzantine-Arab frontier region in the middle of the 9th century.

In the next year, Abbas accompanied his father and uncle in a major expedition into Byzantine Anatolia. After the Arab army crossed the Cilician Gates and took Heraclea Cybistra in early July, it divided in three corps, headed by the Caliph, al-Mu'tasim and Abbas, and proceeded to raid across Cappadocia. The other two forces achieved little of consequence in the already repeatedly devastated area, but Abbas met with more success: he forced the town of Tyana to capitulate and razed it, and met and defeated the Byzantine army under the emperor Theophilos (r. 829–842) in a minor skirmish. Al-Ma'mun kept up the pressure on the Byzantines in 832, with his army capturing the strategically important fortress of Loulon, and in late 832 the Caliph began gathering a huge army and announced that he intended to conquer and colonize Anatolia step by step, and finally subjugate the Empire by capturing Constantinople itself. Consequently, on 25 May 833, Abbas with the advance force marched into Byzantine territory and began creating a military base at the site of Tyana. The site had been fortified and awaited the arrival of the Caliph's army, which in early July crossed into Anatolia. At this juncture al-Ma'mun fell ill and died, although some modern scholars speculate that his death may have been the result of a coup.

On receiving news of the Caliph's illness, Abbas abandoned his army and sped to his father's encampment, where he joined his uncle al-Mu'tasim at al-Ma'mun's deathbed. As al-Ma'mun's son, and given his prominent role in his father's last campaigns, Abbas was considered a contender for the succession, although it is unclear if he was ever formally appointed heir apparent, as al-Dinawari claims. His main rival was his uncle al-Mu'tasim, who according to the account of al-Tabari was named heir by al-Ma'mun on his deathbed. Whatever the true events, al-Mu'tasim was ascendant, as demonstrated by the fact that he performed the funerary prayer for his brother. Abbas swiftly and publicly swore allegiance to al-Mu'tasim, thereby moving to assuage the troops, many of whom were displeased at Abbas being passed over, and wanting to proclaim him caliph instead.

Nevertheless, al-Mu'tasim's hold on the throne was still shaky, and he abandoned Ma'mun's campaign; the new base at Tyana was razed, and the still restive army returned to the Caliphate. Despite his acceptance of his uncle's succession, Abbas was removed from his governorship of the frontier lands, but retained the support of several leading figures in the Abbasid court. He soon became the focus of the factions opposed to al-Mu'tasim, and in particular his increasing reliance on, and favour shown to, his Turkic slave-soldiers (ghilman). This discontent resulted in an alleged conspiracy led by the general Ujayf ibn Anbasa which aimed to kill al-Mu'tasim and place Abbas on the throne. The plot was reportedly uncovered while al-Mu'tasim was campaigning against the Byzantines in 838, with the Caliph informed of it just after the celebrated Sack of Amorium. The resulting investigation, headed by al-Mu'tasim's trusted Turkic general Ashinas, resulted in the execution of most conspirators. This was broadened into a virtual purge of the army, in which the hitherto dominant Khurasani element was replaced with al-Mu'tasim's favoured Turks. According to al-Tabari, Abbas confessed to knowing of the plot while drunk. He was imprisoned at Manbij by another of al-Mu'tasim's lieutenants, al-Afshin, who executed him by a slow and torturous way: Abbas was fed very salty food, denied water, and exposed to the sun wrapped in a felt blanket, until he died. His four brothers by Sundus were imprisoned by the Turkic commander Itakh in the latter's basement, and were never seen again, while Abbas' male descendants were imprisoned and executed by Ashinas.

== Sources ==
- Gordon, Matthew S. (2001). The Breaking of a Thousand Swords: A History of the Turkish Military of Samarra (A.H. 200–275/815–889 C.E.). Albany, New York: State University of New York Press. ISBN 0-7914-4795-2.
- Treadgold, Warren (1988). The Byzantine Revival, 780–842. Stanford, California: Stanford University Press. ISBN 978-0-8047-1462-4.
- Turner, John P. (2013). "al-ʿAbbās b. al-Maʾmūn". In Fleet, Kate; Krämer, Gudrun; Matringe, Denis; Nawas, John; Rowson, Everett (eds.). Encyclopaedia of Islam (3rd ed.). Brill Online. doi:10.1163/1573-3912_ei3_COM_24639. ISBN 9789004252691. ISSN 1873-9830.
- Zetterstéen, K. V. (1960). "al-ʿAbbās b. al-Maʾmūn". In Gibb, H. A. R.; Kramers, J. H.; Lévi-Provençal, E.; Schacht, J.; Lewis, B. & Pellat, Ch. (eds.). The Encyclopaedia of Islam, Second Edition. Volume I: A–B. Leiden: E. J. Brill. pp. 11–12. doi:10.1163/1573-3912_islam_SIM_0023. OCLC 495469456.
