= Gasmouloi =

Descendants of mixed Byzantine Greek and Latin unions

The Gasmouloi (singular: Gasmoulos; Greek: γασμοῦλοι, singular: γασμοῦλος) or Vasmouloi (singular: Vasmoulos; Greek: βασμοῦλοι, singular: βασμοῦλος) were the descendants of mixed Byzantine Greek and "Latin" (West European, most often Italian) unions during the last centuries of the Byzantine Empire. As the Gasmouloi were enrolled as marines in the Byzantine navy by Emperor Michael VIII Palaiologos (r. 1259–1261), the term eventually lost its ethnic connotations and came to be applied generally to those owing a military service from the early 14th century on.

== History ==
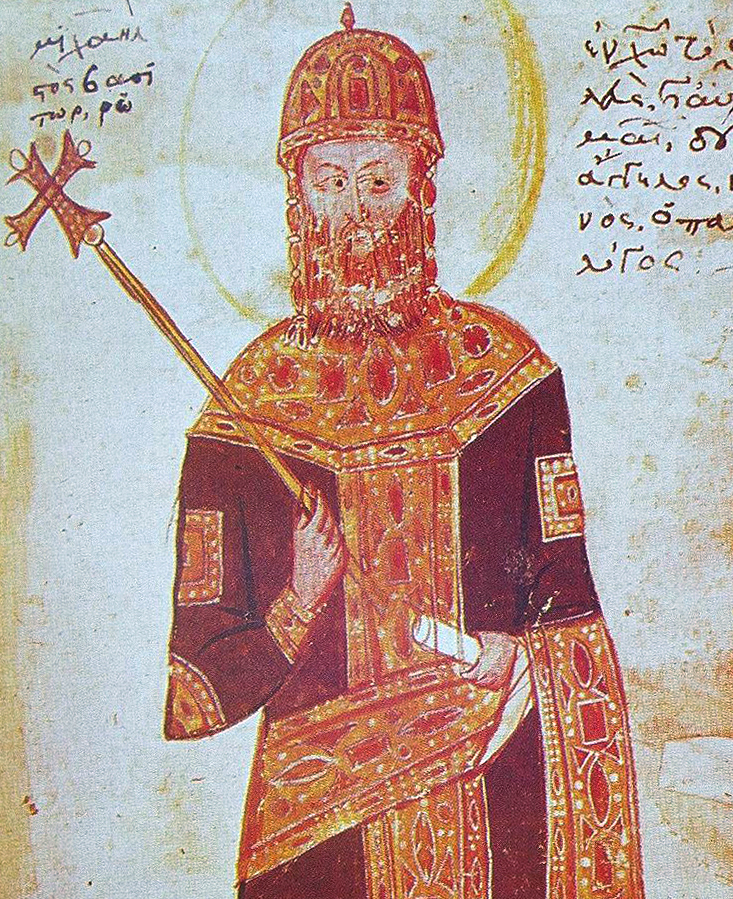
The Byzantine emperor Michael VIII Palaiologos, who enrolled the Gasmouloi as marines in his fleet.

Following the Fourth Crusade, mixed unions between Greeks and Latins occurred to a very limited extent when the Latin Empire and the other Western principalities were established on Byzantine soil. The term gasmoulos itself is of unknown etymology and first appeared in the second half of the 13th century. It is, however, not unlikely that it has some relation with the Latin word mulus, "mule". Although it was generally used to refer to children of these mixed unions, it more specifically designated the children of a Byzantine woman and a Latin (often Venetian) father. The Gasmouloi were socially ostracized and distrusted by both the Byzantines and the Latins, who distrusted their ambiguous identity. In the words of a French treatise of ca. 1330, "They present themselves as Greeks to Greeks and Latins to Latins, being all things to everyone...". In a treaty signed in 1277 between Michael VIII and the Venetians, the Gasmouloi of Venetian heritage were considered as Venetian citizens, but in subsequent decades, many reverted to a Byzantine allegiance. As some of their descendants in turn wished to reclaim their Venetian citizenship, the issue of the Gasmouloi would plague Byzantine-Venetian relations until the 1320s.

After the recovery of Constantinople by the forces of Michael VIII in 1261, the Gasmouloi were hired by the Emperor as mercenaries. Together with men from Laconia, they served as lightly armed marine infantry in Michael's effort to re-establish a strong "national" navy. The Gasmoulikon corps played a prominent role in the Byzantine campaigns to recover the islands of the Aegean Sea in the 1260s and 1270s, but after Michael VIII's death, his successor, Andronikos II Palaiologos, largely disbanded the navy in 1285. Denied of any remuneration by the Emperor and out of work, some Gasmouloi remained in imperial service, but many others sought employment in the Latin and Turkish fleets, as hired bodyguards for magnates, or turned to piracy.

By the early 14th century, the notion of gasmoulikē douleia ("service as a gasmoulos") had lost its specific ethnic connotations, and gradually came to refer to any service as a lightly armed soldier, both on sea and on land. In this capacity, Gasmouloi served the Byzantines and Ottomans in the 14th century, and the Latin principalities of the Aegean (where the servitio et tenimento vasmulia was hereditary) in the 15th and 16th centuries. The Byzantine navy, such as it was during the empire's last century, continued to use their services. The Gasmouloi played a role in the Byzantine civil war of 1341–1347, fiercely supporting their commander, the megas doux Alexios Apokaukos, against John VI Kantakouzenos. After the latter's victory, many of the Gasmouloi of Constantinople must have been dismissed. Those of Kallipoli eventually joined the Ottoman Turks, providing the crews for the first Ottoman fleets.

== See also ==
- Griko people
- Mixobarbaroi

== Sources ==
- Ahrweiler, Hélène (1966). Byzance et la mer: La marine de guerre, la politique et les institutiones aritimes de Byzance aux VIIe–XVe siècles (in French). Paris: Presses universitaires de France.
- Bartusis, Mark (1991). "Gasmoulos". In Kazhdan, Alexander (ed.). The Oxford Dictionary of Byzantium. Oxford and New York: Oxford University Press. p. 823. ISBN 0-19-504652-8.
- Bartusis, Mark (1997). The Late Byzantine Army: Arms and Society 1204–1453. Philadelphia, Pennsylvania: University of Pennsylvania Press. ISBN 0-8122-1620-2.
- D’Amato, Raffaele (2010). "The Last Marines of Byzantium: Gasmouloi, Tzakones and Prosalentai. A Short History and a Proposed Reconstruction of their Uniforms and Equipment". Journal of Mediterranean Studies. 19 (2): 219–248. ISSN 2523-9465.
- Heurtley, W. A. (1967). A Short History of Greece from Early Times to 1964. New York and London: Cambridge University Press. ISBN 0-521-09454-2.
- Laiou, Angeliki E. (1972). Constantinople and the Latins: The Foreign Policy of Andronicus II, 1282–1328. Cambridge, Massachusetts: Harvard University Press. ISBN 9780674165359.
- Nicol, Donald M. (1988). Byzantium and Venice: A Study in Diplomatic and Cultural Relations. Cambridge: Cambridge University Press. ISBN 0-521-34157-4.
