= Mixobarbaroi =

Ancient Greek and Byzantine ethnographical term

Mixobarbaroi or Mixovarvaroi (Greek: μιξοβάρβαροι or μειξοβάρβαροι, Latin: semibarbari, "semi-/mixed/half barbarians") was an ethnographical term used to refer to either Greeks who had barbarian qualities or to people of mixed Greek and barbarian descent.

== Ancient Greece ==
The term first used in Classical Greece by authors to denote people who lived in the frontiers of the oikoumene, and had qualities of both the civilized peoples and the barbarians, as seen in the works of Euripides, Plato and Xenophon. It would later come to describe mixed Greeks or other people mixed with barbarian peoples in the Greek lands of cultural plurality.

Whereas mixobarbaroi usually refers to Greeks who have become "barbarianized", the term mixellenes (Greek: μιξέλληνες; semi/mixed-Greeks) appears to mean non-Greeks who have become Hellenized, either by blood or by adopting Greek culture.

In the Socratic dialogue Menexenus, a group of "barbarians" considered themselves Greeks, but were not full-blooded Greeks, thus only "mixobarbaroi". Xenophon describes the people of Cedreiae in Asia Minor, who were allies to Athens, as "mixobarbaroi", meaning those who were bound to treaties with Athens but were not Athenian.

== Rome and Byzantium ==
After the Christianization of the Roman Empire and the first Christian emperor Constantine the Great, the term was used to denote non-Romans of Christian faith living in the frontiers, bound by treaties to the emperor, thus being of half-barbarian stock, as opposed to ordinary "barbarians", who were either non-civilized, pagan or not living in the frontiers.

In the Byzantine period, this term was used by authors chiefly in the 11th and 12th centuries to denote ethnically and linguistically mixed populations, such as those that existed in the Danube provinces. Anna Komnene refers to the people of Paristrion as "mixobarbaroi", distinguished from the Scythians, whom they nevertheless shared language with. She, and many other contemporary authors, also used the term in the aftermath of the Seljuk invasions of Anatolia, primarily in reference to the offspring of Turkoman men with native Christian women. Historian Speros Vryonis commented that the Mixovarvaroi were considerable in number by the early 12th century and, whilst evidence suggests that these offspring often spoke Greek as well as Turkish, the majority were of Muslim faith and fought for the Seljuk Sultans. Over time this phenomenon played a part in the reduction of the Christian population, the Islamisation and the Turkification of Anatolia:

These mixovarvaroi suffered occasionally from a dichotomy of political sympathy and allegiance, but in the long run their appearance in Anatolia resulted in a process that favored the growth of the Muslim population at the expense of the Christian population, because Muslim society dominated politically and militarily.

The army of the Emir Monolycus, whom John Doukas fought to retake the town of Polybotus after the First Crusade, was described as being composed of "mixobarbaroi" who spoke Greek. The armies of the Sultan of Iconium and the Danishmendids were also described as "mixobarbaroi".

== Modern uses ==
The term mixo-barbarous refers to the writing language of Modern Greek that was characterized with Hellenic phrases, ancient syntax and overall ancient mimic, but combined with modern and foreign etymology applied to the vulgar dialect used by Greeks during and after the Fall of Constantinople.

== See also ==
- Turcopoles: soldiers of Turkic or mixed-Turkic origins recruited by the Byzantine Empire and the Crusader States.
- Karamanlides: Turkophone Greeks native to Karaman.
- Urums: Turkophone Greek Orthodox people native to Crimea.
- Hayhurum: Armenian-speaking Greek Orthodox people native to Eastern Anatolia.
- Gasmouloi: descendants of mixed Byzantine Greek and "Latin" intermarriage
- Turkic Christians: Turkic peoples that adhered Christianity

== Sources ==
- Chu, Jeffrey (2022). Thracians Among Others: A Study of "Thracianness" in Ancient Cross-Cultural Contexts (PDF) (Thesis).
- Kazhdan, Alexander, ed. (1991). Oxford Dictionary of Byzantium. Oxford University Press. ISBN 978-0-19-504652-6.
- Martin Leake, William (1814). Researches in Greece. J. Booth.
- Stephenson, Paul (2004). Byzantium's Balkan Frontier: A Political Study of the Northern Balkans, 900–1204. ISBN 0-521-77017-3.
- Vryonis, Speros (1971). The Decline of Medieval Hellenism in Asia Minor and the Process of Islamization from the Eleventh through the Fifteenth Century. University of California Press. ISBN 0-520-01597-5.
