= Rendakis =

Byzantine noble family

Rendakis (Greek: Ρενδάκις), also Rendakios (Ρενδάκιος) or Rentakios (Ρεντάκιος) was a powerful Byzantine noble family in the 8th to 10th centuries.

== History ==
The Rendakis family was first mentioned during the reign of Leo III the Isaurian (r. 717–741). Although the family were native Greek speakers, the etymology of the family name is believed by some scholars to have been of Slavic origin. In the beginning of the 8th century, the number of officials of clearly provincial origin had increased, and the Rendakioi was one of these families. In the 9th century, the family numbered among the most powerful families in the Byzantine Empire, alongside those of Bryennios, Choirosphaktes, Monomachos, and Tessarakontapechys.

== Members ==
- Sisinnios Rendakis (Σισίννιος, fl. 719), patrikios and strategos of the Anatolic Theme under Emperor Leo III, according to the Miracles of Saint Demetrius, he commanded the imperial fleet that saved Thessaloniki from the barbarians. He was from Macedonia. He fought against and was beheaded by the Bulgarians in ca. 718–719 because he had supported the attempt by the deposed emperor Anastasios II to recover his throne.
- Rentakios (fl. 866–867), protovestiarios and parakoimomenos.
- Rentakios Helladikos (fl. 913–927), a native of Hellas, blinded by Emperor Romanos I Lekapenos for the plot to kill his own father, stealing and selling his family possessions, and forging a letter to Tsar Symeon of Bulgaria in order to desert.
  - Niketas Rentakios or Niketas Helladikos, Peloponnesian magnate
    - Sophia, married Christopher Lekapenos (co-emperor 921–931), son of Romanos I
- Constantine Rendakis
  - Demetrios Phalakros
- Rendakios the Athenian (fl. 1055), son-in-law of Sergios Betelakes. Married Helene.
