= Koçyazı, Yunak =

Koçyazı
- Neighbourhood
- Location in Turkey Koçyazı (Turkey Central Anatolia)
- Coordinates: 38°45′3″N 31°36′29″E
- Country: Turkey
- Province: Konya
- District: Yunak
- Elevation: 1,109 m (3,638 ft)
- Population (2022): 964
- Time zone: UTC+3 (TRT)
- Postal code: 42530
- Area code: 0332

Koçyazı (formerly: Çıpkanlı) is a neighbourhood of the municipality and district of Yunak, Konya Province, Turkey. Its population is 964 (2022). Before the 2013 reorganisation, it was a town (belde). It is 122 km (76 miles) from Afyon, 180 km (110 miles) from Konya, 60 km (37 miles) from Akşehir, and 18 km (11 miles) from Yunak. The climate of the locality is within the domain of the continental climate.

== Population ==
Historical population
Year	Pop.	±% p.a.
1997	2,236	—
2007	1,825	−2.01%
2012	1,505	−3.78%
2017	1,136	−5.47%
2022	964	−3.23%
Source: 1997 census and TÜIK (2007-2022)

== Politics ==
Kocyazi was managed by the municipality until 2015. After 2015, the Municipality of Kocyazi was left to the Neighborhood Representative of the municipalities with the Law No. 6360 of Metropolitan.

Mayors
Mayor names	Management year	Political Party	Buyer Rate – Percentage
Şaban Arat	2009–2014	Ak Parti	371 – %37.21
Osman Odabaşı	2004–2009	Ak Parti	553 – %42.80
İbrahim Ünlü	1999–2004	Refah Partisi	440 – %34.89
Kadir Budak	1994–1999	Doğru Yol Partisi	518 – %27.68
Osman Gündoğdu	1989–1994	Refah Partisi	667 – %61.65
Ali Osman Tanrıöver	1993–1994	Ana Vatan Partisi	Opening the Municipality

Neighborhood Representative
Representative names	Management year	Buyer Rate – Percentage
Mahmut İçen	2014 – present	546 – %42.45

== Economy ==
The economy of the neighborhood is based on agriculture, animal husbandry, and trade.

== Service department ==
In the neighborhood, there are primary and secondary schools. PTT branch. PTT agency, Family Health Center, Reeve Department, and Fire Department. Its infrastructure includes a drinking water network and sewerage.
