= Kaydar Nasr ibn Abdallah =

Abbasid governor of Egypt

Nasr ibn Abdallah, known as Kaydar (Arabic: كيدر نصر بن عبد الله; nisbah given variously as al-Safadi الصفدي or al-Sughdi الصغدي) was a governor of Egypt for the Abbasid Caliphate, serving there from 832 until his death in 834.

== Career ==
Kaydar appears to have been of Sogdian descent, and he was considered a client of the Commander of the Faithful (mawla amir al-mu'minin). He was appointed to the governorship of Egypt by the caliph al-Ma'mun (r. 813–833) following the latter's visit to the province in February 832. The caliph also sent a "foreigner" (ajam) named Ibn Bistam to serve as chief of security (shurtah), but Kaydar dismissed him over charges of bribery and ordered him to be whipped in the mosque, after which he appointed his own son Muzaffar to lead the shurtah instead.

During Kaydar's governorship, al-Ma'mun ordered the beginning of the mihnah or inquisition, to ensure compliance with his belief that the Qur'an had been created. In 833 Kaydar received a letter from al-Ma'mun's brother and successor Abu Ishaq, announcing the formation of the mihnah and instructing him to implement it in Egypt. He accordingly questioned the qadi Harun ibn Abdallah al-Zuhri, along with other officials and legal experts, and received their affirmation of the createdness of the Qur'an.

A few months after the beginning of the mihnah, al-Ma'mun died in August 833 and was succeeded by Abu Ishaq, who took the regnal name al-Mu'tasim (r. 833–842). The new caliph wrote to Kaydar, ordering him to drop the names of the provincial Arabs from the army registers (diwan) and stop paying their salaries. This act met stiff resistance, however, and soon a certain Yahya ibn al-Wazir al-Jarawi revolted and drew five hundred men to his cause. Kaydar responded by preparing to engage the rebels, but he died in 834, and the governorship was taken over by his son Muzaffar.

== Notes ==
Preceded by Isa ibn Mansur al-Rafi'i	Governor of Egypt; 832–834	Succeeded by Muzaffar ibn Kaydar
