= Yunak =

- District and municipality
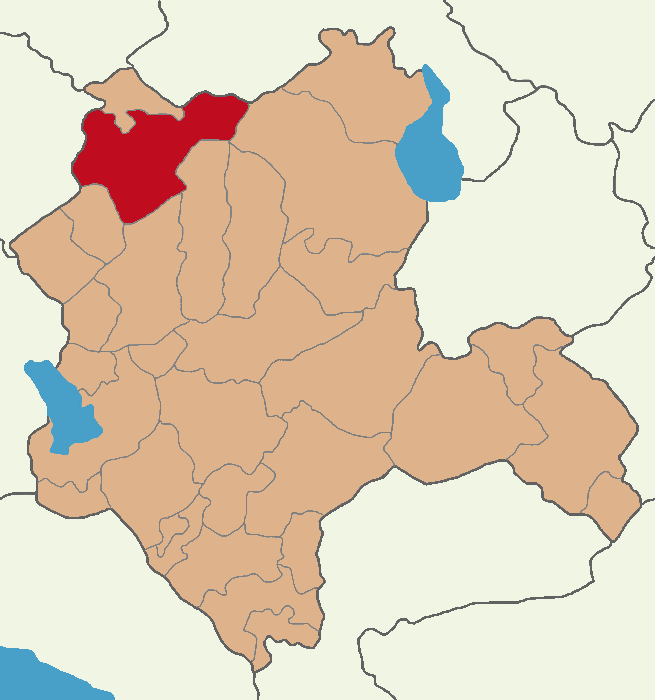
- Map showing Yunak District in Konya Province

- Location in Turkey Yunak (Turkey Central Anatolia)
- Coordinates: 38°49′02″N 31°44′08″E
- Country: Turkey
- Province: Konya

Government
  - Mayor: Ali Konak (AKP)
- Area: 2,101 km^{2} (811 sq mi)
- Elevation: 1,080 m (3,540 ft)
- Population (2022): 20,991
  - Density: 9.991/km^{2} (25.88/sq mi)
- Time zone: UTC+3 (TRT)
- Postal code: 42530
- Area code: 0332
- Website: www.yunak.bel.tr

Yunak is a municipality and district of Konya Province, Turkey. Its area is 2,101 km^{2}, and its population is 20,991 (2022).

== Composition ==
There are 42 neighbourhoods in Yunak District:

- Altınöz
- Ayrıtepe
- Beşışıklı
- Böğrüdelik
- Çayırbaşı
- Cebrail
- Eğrikuyu
- Esentepe
- Eşme
- Fatih
- Hacıfakılı
- Hacıömeroğlu
- Harunlar
- Hatırlı
- Hursunlu
- İmamoğlu
- Karataş
- Karayayla
- Kargalı
- Kıllar
- Koçyazı
- Kurtuşağı
- Kuyubaşı
- Kuzören
- Meşelik
- Odabaşı
- Ortakışla
- Özyayla
- Piribeyli
- Saray
- Selçuk
- Sertler
- Sevinç
- Sinanlı
- Sıram
- Sülüklü
- Turgut
- Yavaşlı
- Yeni
- Yeşiloba
- Yeşilyayla
- Yığar

== Climate ==
Yunak experiences a transitional continental and Mediterranean climate (Köppen: Csa/Dsa), with hot, dry summers, and cold winters.

Climate data for Yunak (1991–2020)
Month	Jan	Feb	Mar	Apr	May	Jun	Jul	Aug	Sep	Oct	Nov	Dec	Year
Mean daily maximum °C (°F)	4.2 (39.6)	6.3 (43.3)	10.9 (51.6)	16.1 (61.0)	21.4 (70.5)	26.0 (78.8)	29.8 (85.6)	29.7 (85.5)	25.4 (77.7)	19.0 (66.2)	12.1 (53.8)	6.0 (42.8)	17.3 (63.1)
Daily mean °C (°F)	0.1 (32.2)	1.6 (34.9)	5.5 (41.9)	10.2 (50.4)	15.2 (59.4)	19.3 (66.7)	22.6 (72.7)	22.6 (72.7)	18.7 (65.7)	13.3 (55.9)	7.0 (44.6)	2.0 (35.6)	11.6 (52.9)
Mean daily minimum °C (°F)	−3.2 (26.2)	−2.1 (28.2)	1.0 (33.8)	5.3 (41.5)	10.0 (50.0)	13.6 (56.5)	16.3 (61.3)	16.4 (61.5)	12.9 (55.2)	8.7 (47.7)	3.1 (37.6)	−1.2 (29.8)	6.8 (44.2)
Average precipitation mm (inches)	39.28 (1.55)	40.14 (1.58)	47.69 (1.88)	51.55 (2.03)	51.13 (2.01)	40.62 (1.60)	13.72 (0.54)	11.63 (0.46)	16.61 (0.65)	37.46 (1.47)	39.52 (1.56)	52.16 (2.05)	441.51 (17.38)
Average precipitation days (≥ 1.0 mm)	6.5	6.2	7.3	7.7	7.7	5.3	2.7	2.8	2.8	4.8	5.1	7.2	66.1
Average relative humidity (%)	77.6	71.8	63.7	58.7	56.7	53.3	46.0	46.6	48.7	59.1	66.8	77.0	60.5
Source: NOAA
