= Polybotus =

City in the Roman province of Phrygia Salutaris

Coordinates: 38°42′46″N 31°02′55″E

Polybotus or Polybotos (Greek: Πολύβοτος) was a city in the Roman province of Phrygia Salutaris. Its site is located 3 miles (4.8 km) southwest of Bolvadin in Asiatic Turkey.

== History ==
This town is mentioned in the 6th century by Hierocles in his Synecdemus.

A map of Byzantine Anatolia with Polybotus located in the Anatolic Theme

Due to the wide-ranging grasslands, the area was used as a mustering place (e.g. possibly by emperor Romanos IV Diogenes) and one of the metata (imperial stock-raising farm) was situated nearby between Polybotus, Dokimion and Synnada (though it was moved to Europe after the Seljuk invasions in the 11th century). The city was sacked in 838 by retreating Arab troops under caliph Al-Mu'tasim according to the vita of John of Polybotus.

The Seljuks first occupied Polybotus some time after the Battle of Manzikert, but the town was reconquered in the aftermath of the First Crusade by Emperor Alexios I Komnenos and his general John Doukas, as is recounted in the Alexiad. To retake the city, John Doukas fought against the Emir Monolycus and his army, which contained mixovarvaroi who spoke Greek. The town became part of a contested area between the Byzantine Empire and the Sultanate of Rum, with neither being able to exert durable control in the early 12th century, until it was lost to the Seljuks later that century.

== Ecclesiastical history ==
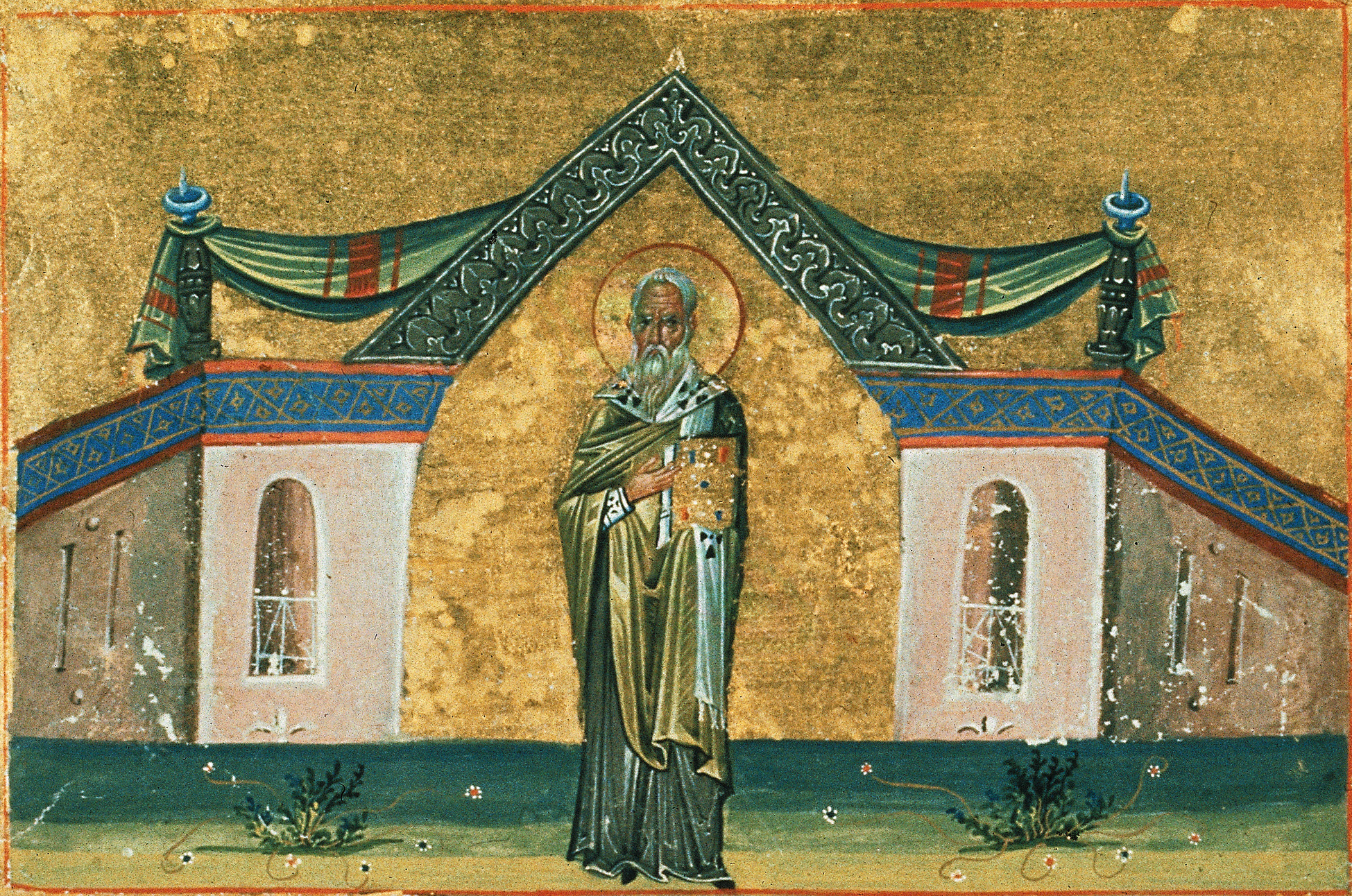
John, Bishop of Polybotum (Menologion of Basil II)

The earliest Greek Notitia Episcopatuum of the 7th century places the see among the suffragans of Synnada. After Amorium became a metropolitan see in the 9th century, Polybotus became a suffragan of Amorium until its disappearance as a residential see.

Le Quien mentions two bishops:

- Strategius, present at the Council of Chalcedon (451);
- St. John the Thaumaturgus, whose feast is celebrated on 5 December and who lived under Leo the Isaurian.

At the Second Council of Nicaea (787), the see was represented by the priest Gregory.

The bishopric is included in the Catholic Church's list of titular sees.
