= Mistea =

Town of ancient Lycaonia

Coordinates: 37°40′35″N 31°43′34″E

Mistea or Misthia (Greek: Μισθία) also known as Claudiocaesarea (Κλαυδιοκαισαρεία), was a town of ancient Lycaonia, inhabited in Hellenistic, Roman, and Byzantine times. Misthia was the seat of an archbishop; no longer residential, it remains a titular see of the Roman Catholic Church.

Its site is located near Beyşehir, Asiatic Turkey.
