= Anatolic Theme =

Theme of the Byzantine Empire

Theme of the Anatolics Άνατολικόν θέμα, θέμα Άνατολικῶν
- Theme of the Byzantine Empire
- 640s/660s – c. 1078
- The Byzantine themes of Asia Minor in circa 740
- Capital: Amorium; Polybotos
- Historical era: Middle Ages
  - Established: before 669
  - Fall to the Seljuks: 8 September 1078
- Today part of: Turkey

The Anatolic Theme (Greek: Άνατολικόν [θέμα], Anatolikon [thema]), more properly known as the Theme of the Anatolics (Greek: θέμα Άνατολικῶν, thema Anatolikōn), was a Byzantine theme (a military-civilian province) in central Asia Minor (modern Turkey). From its establishment, it was the largest and senior-most of the themes, and its military governors (stratēgoi) were powerful individuals, several of them rising to the imperial throne or launching failed rebellions to capture it. The theme and its army played an important role in the Arab–Byzantine wars of the 7th–10th centuries, after which it enjoyed a period of relative peace that lasted until its conquest by the Seljuk Turks in the late 1070s.

== Geography and administration ==
In its "classical" form during the 8th and 9th centuries, the theme stretched over the ancient regions of Lycaonia, Pisidia, Isauria, as well as most of Phrygia and parts of Galatia Salutaris. Initially, the Anatolic Theme included the western and southern shores of Asia Minor as well, but by c. 720 they were split off to form the Thracesian and Cibyrrhaeot themes. Under Theophilos (r. 829–842), its eastern and south-eastern portions, facing the Arab frontier zone and including the forts that guarded the northern entrance to the Cilician Gates, were detached to form two new frontier districts (kleisourai), those of Cappadocia (originally a division, or tourma, of the Anatolics) and Seleucia. Emperor Leo VI the Wise (r. 886–912) later ceded the region west of Lake Tatta (the banda of Eudokias,Hagios Agapetos and Aphrazeia) to Cappadocia. The theme's capital was Amorium, until the sack of the city by the Abbasids in 838. After that, it was probably transferred to the nearby fortress of Polybotos.

According to the 10th-century Arab geographers Qudama ibn Ja'far and Ibn al-Faqih, the Anatolic Theme, "the largest of the provinces of the Romans", fielded 15,000 men, and contained 34 fortresses. It and its military governor, or stratēgos, first attested in 690, ranked first in precedence among the theme governors. As such, the "stratēgos of the Anatolics" (στρατηγός τῶν Άνατολικῶν) was one of the highest in the Empire, and one of the few posts from which eunuchs were specifically barred. The holders of the post received an annual salary of 40 pounds of gold, and are attested as holding the senior court ranks of patrikios, anthypatos, and prōtospatharios. In addition, they were the only ones to be appointed to the exceptional post of monostrategos ("single-general"), overall commander of the Asian land themes.

== History ==
The exact date of the theme's establishment is unknown. Along with the other original themes, it was created sometime after the 640s as a military encampment area for the remnants of the old field armies of the East Roman army, which were withdrawn to Asia Minor in the face of the Muslim conquests. The Anatolic Theme was settled and took its name from the army of the East (Greek: Άνατολή, Anatolē). The theme is attested for the first time in 669, while the army itself is mentioned, as the exercitus Orientalis, as late as an iussio of Justinian II in 687.

=== Wars with the Arabs and the Turks ===
During the wars with the Arabs in the 7th and 8th centuries, the Anatolic Theme—especially Cappadocia, its easternmost region—was frequently either a target of Arab invasions, or at the forefront of the Byzantine counter-raids into Arab territory, which began after the middle of the 8th century.

The thematic capital, Amorium, was also a frequent target of the Arabs. It was attacked already in 644, captured in 646, and briefly occupied in 669. The Arabs reached it again in 708 and besieged it without success in 716, during their march on Constantinople. The tide of the Arab attacks ebbed in the 740s, after the Byzantine victory at the Battle of Akroinon and the turmoil of the Third Fitna and the Abbasid Revolution, and under Emperor Constantine V (r. 741–775), the Anatolics spearheaded the Byzantine campaigns into Arab-held territory. This in turn provoked the reaction of the Abbasid Caliphate, which in the quarter-century after 780 launched repeated invasions of Byzantine Asia Minor. Thus the Anatolics suffered a heavy defeat at Kopidnadon in 788, and Amorium was threatened again in 797. In the early years of the 9th century, Cappadocia was the focus of Arab attacks, which culminated in the great invasion of 806 led by Caliph Harun al-Rashid (r. 786–809) himself, which took Heraclea Cybistra and several other forts.

The Byzantine themes of Asia Minor in circa 842, showing the fragmentation of the large original themes into smaller circumscriptions

The late antique urban fabric suffered considerably from the Arab attacks and the concomitant decline of urbanization, but most of the cities in the interior of the theme, i.e. in Phrygia and Pisidia, survived, albeit in a reduced form. The cities of eastern Cappadocia (the former province of Cappadocia Secunda), however, which bordered the Caliphate, were practically destroyed, as was Antioch in Pisidia. The foundation of the new kleisourai along the eastern frontier, especially Cappadocia, in the 9th century, meant that Arab raids henceforth were absorbed there, and seldom reached the Anatolic Theme's territory. Apart from Caliph al-Mu'tasim's great invasion against Amorium in 838, attacks that penetrated into the Anatolics' territory are reported for the year 878, when the thematic troops successfully defended Mistheia, and again in 888, 894 and 897, always in the southeastern portion of the theme around Iconium. The 10th century was largely peaceful, with the exception of yet another sack of Amorium in 931 and a raid that reached Iconium in 963.

The first Turkish attack on the theme is recorded in 1069, when the Turks attacked Iconium. Most of the province was overrun by the Turks after the Battle of Manzikert in 1071, with Iconium becoming the seat of the Seljuk Sultanate of Rum in the 12th century. The last appearance of the Anatolic Theme in the historical sources is in 1077, when its stratēgos, Nikephoros Botaneiates, proclaimed himself emperor (Nikephoros III, r. 1078–1081). The Byzantines managed to recover some of the western and northern portions of the theme in the subsequent decades under the Komnenian emperors, but the Anatolic Theme was never reconstituted.

=== Rebellions ===
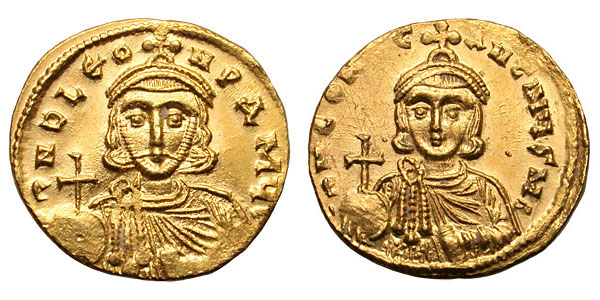
Gold solidus of Leo III the Isaurian and his son, Constantine V

Directly facing the forces of the Caliphate during its first centuries of existence, and benefiting from its support of the Isaurian emperors, the Anatolic Theme was the most powerful and most prestigious of the themes. Its very power, however, also meant that it was a potential threat to the emperors: already in 669, the thematic army revolted and forced Constantine IV (r. 668–685) to re-install his brothers, Heraclius and Tiberius as his co-emperors, while in 695 a former stratēgos, Leontios (r. 695–698), usurped the throne from Justinian II (r. 685–695, 705–711), and in 717 the then stratēgos, Leo the Isaurian, became emperor (Leo III, r. 717–741) after deposing Theodosios III (r. 715–717). Henceforth, the Anatolics would be stalwart supporters of the Isaurians, including their iconoclastic policies, and in 742 Leo III's son and successor, Constantine V, found refuge and support in the theme against the usurper Artabasdos.

The Anatolic Theme served as the base for several bids for the throne in later centuries as well: the failed revolt of Bardanes Tourkos in 803 was followed by the successful proclamation of Leo V the Armenian (r. 813–820) by the Anatolic troops in 813, and the large-scale rebellion of Thomas the Slav in 820–823. In the 10th century, however, the theme appears on the sidelines of the rebellions of the period. The next and last rebellion by a stratēgos of the Anatolics was that of Nikephoros Xiphias in 1022, against Basil II (r. 976–1025).

== Strategoi ==
Strategos of Anatolikon
- στρατηγός Ἀνατολικών
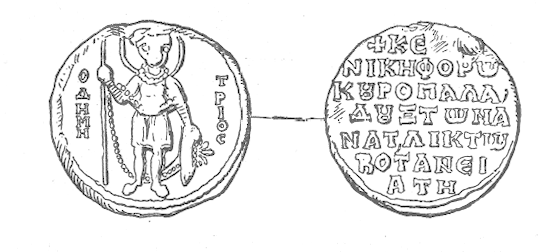
- Lead seal of Nikephoros III Botaneiates as kouropalates and doux of Anatolikon, c. 1077
- Style: Strategos; Doux
- Member of: Byzantine Senate
- Seat: Amorium
- Appointer: Byzantine emperor
- Term length: 4 years(?)
- Formation: c. 669
- First holder: Leo
- Final holder: Nikephoros Botaneiates
- Abolished: c. 1078
- Salary: 2,880 nomismata (c. 959)

- Leo (682?)
- Leontius (after 682–692)
- Sissinios Rendakios? (c.705–711)
- Leo (c.713–717)
- Michael Melissenos (766–771?)
- Artabasdos (778?)
- Marianos (8th century)
- Peter (8th century)
- Demetrius (8th century)
- Artabasdos (8th/9th century)
- Maurice (8th/9th century)
- Bardanes (8th/9th century)
- Marinos (8th/9th century)
- Bardanes (8th/9th century)
- Aetios (c.800–802)
- Bardanes Tourkos (802–803)
- Romanos (after 803–811)
- Leo (811–813)
- Manuel (816–819)
- Krateros (816-?)
- Photeinos (820s)
- Aetios (c.838)
- Theodotus Melissenos (c.843/844)
- Leo Krateros (c.867)
- John (9th century)
- Phokas (9th century)
- Leo (9th century)
- Theodore (9th century)
- Eustathios Argyros (c.904–907)
- Basil (9th/10th century)
- Balantios (9th/10th century)
- Andreas (9th/10th century)
- Bardas Phokas the Elder (after 910-before 919)
- Nikephoros Phokas (945–955)
- Leo Phokas the Younger (955–960)
- John Tzimiskes (c.963- before 969)
- Adralestus Diogenes (c.970)
- Leo Melissenos (Late 10th century)
- Alexios (10th century)
- Nikephoros (10th century)
- Andronikos (10th century)
- Gregoras (10th century)
- Leo (10th century)
- Nikephoros (11th century)
- Nikephoros Xiphias (after 1018–1022)
- Theophylact Dalassenos (1022- before 1027)

== Sources ==
- Bury, J. B.; Philotheus (1911). The Imperial Administrative System of the Ninth Century (With a Revised Text of the Kletorologion of Philotheos). London: Oxford University Press.
- Gyftopoulou, Sofia (11 May 2003). Ανατολικών Θέμα. Encyclopedia of the Hellenic World, Asia Minor (in Greek). Athens: Foundation of the Hellenic World.
- Haldon, John F. (1997). Byzantium in the Seventh Century: The Transformation of a Culture. Cambridge: Cambridge University Press. ISBN 978-0-521-31917-1.
- Haldon, John (1999). Warfare, State and Society in the Byzantine World, 565–1204. London: UCL Press. ISBN 1-85728-495-X.
- Kazhdan, Alexander, ed. (1991). The Oxford Dictionary of Byzantium. Oxford and New York: Oxford University Press. ISBN 0-19-504652-8.
- Lilie, Ralph-Johannes (1976). Die byzantinische Reaktion auf die Ausbreitung der Araber. Studien zur Strukturwandlung des byzantinischen Staates im 7. und 8. Jhd (in German). Munich: Institut für Byzantinistik und Neugriechische Philologie der Universität München. OCLC 797598069.
- Nesbitt, John; Oikonomides, Nicolas, eds. (1996). Catalogue of Byzantine Seals at Dumbarton Oaks and in the Fogg Museum of Art, Volume 3: West, Northwest, and Central Asia Minor and the Orient. Vol. 3. Washington, DC: Dumbarton Oaks Research Library and Collection. ISBN 0-88402-250-1.
- Pertusi, A. (1952). Constantino Porfirogenito: De Thematibus (in Italian). Rome: Biblioteca Apostolica Vaticana.
- Treadgold, Warren T. (1995). Byzantium and Its Army, 284–1081. Stanford, California: Stanford University Press. ISBN 0-8047-3163-2.
