= Itakh =

Abbasid army commander (died 849)

Itakh إيتاخ
- Native name: Ītākh al-Khazarī, Ītakh al-Tabbakh
- Born: unknown
- Died: 849 Abbasid Caliphate
- Allegiance: Abbasid Caliphate
- Branch: Abbasid Turkic guard
- Service years: 848
- Conflicts: Sack of Amorium, other Abbasid expeditions
- Children: unknown

Aytākh or Ītākh al-Khazarī (Arabic: إيتاخ الخزري) was a leading commander in the Turkic army of the Abbasid caliph al-Mu'tasim (r. 833-842 C.E.).

As the nisba in his name suggests, he was a Khazar by origin, and is said to have been a slave working in the kitchen of Sallam al-Abrash al-Khadim—whence his nickname al-Tabbakh, "the cook"—before he was purchased as a ghulām by al-Mu'tasim in 815. He rose to become one of the senior commanders in al-Mu'tasim's "Turkic" guard, and participated in several expeditions such as the Sack of Amorium.

Under al-Mu'tasim, he served as sahib al-shurta at Samarra, and became commander of the Caliph's personal guard. By the time of the accession of al-Wathiq in 842, he was, along with the Turk Ashinas, the "mainstay of the caliphate". Al-Wathiq named him governor of the Yemen in 843/4. After the death of Ashinas, in 844/5, he was named governor of Egypt, but he appointed Harthamah ibn al-Nadr al-Jabali there in his stead. Ya'qubi further reports that under al-Wathiq, he was appointed to the governorships of Khurasan, al-Sind, and the sub-provinces of the Tigris River.

When al-Wathiq died unexpectedly in August 847, Itakh was one of the leading officials, along with the vizier Muhammad ibn al-Zayyat, the chief qādī, Ahmad ibn Abi Duwad, his fellow Turkish general Wasif al-Turki, who assembled to determine his successor. Ibn al-Zayyat initially proposed al-Wathiq's son Muhammad (the future al-Muhtadi), but due to his youth he was passed over, and instead the council chose another of al-Mu'tasim's sons, the 26-year-old Ja'far, who became the caliph al-Mutawakkil. Unbeknownst to them, the new Caliph was resolved to destroy the coterie of his father's officials that controlled the state. Al-Mutawakkil's first target was the vizier Ibn al-Zayyat, against whom he harboured a deep grudge over the way he had disrespected him in the past. Thus, on 22 September 847, he sent Itakh to summon Ibn al-Zayyat as if for an audience. Instead, the vizier was brought to Itakh's residence, where he was placed under house arrest. His possessions were confiscated, and he was tortured to death. This was the apogee of Itakh's career: he combined the positions of chamberlain (ḥājib), head of the Caliph's personal guard, intendant of the palace, and head of the barīd, the public post, which doubled as the government's intelligence network.

In 848, however, he was persuaded to go to the pilgrimage, and laid down his powers, only to be arrested on his return. His possessions were confiscated—reportedly, in his house alone the Caliph's agents found one million gold dinars (equivalent to over 4 tons). He died of thirst in prison in 849.

== Sources ==
- Bearman, P. J.; Bianquis, Th.; Bosworth, C. E.; van Donzel, E. & Heinrichs, W. P., eds. (2004). "Aytāk̲h̲ al-Turkī". The Encyclopaedia of Islam, Second Edition. Volume XII: Supplement. Leiden: E. J. Brill. p. 106. doi:10.1163/1573-3912_islam_SIM_8373. ISBN 978-90-04-13974-9.
- Bosworth, C. E., ed. (1991). The History of al-Ṭabarī, Volume XXXIII: Storm and Stress Along the Northern Frontiers of the ʿAbbāsid Caliphate: The Caliphate of al-Muʿtasim, A.D. 833–842/A.H. 218–227. SUNY Series in Near Eastern Studies. Albany, New York: State University of New York Press. ISBN 978-0-7914-0493-5.
- Gordon, Matthew (2001). The Breaking of a Thousand Swords: A History of the Turkish Military of Samarra, A.H. 200–275/815–889 C.E.. Albany, New York: State University of New York Press. ISBN 978-0-7914-4795-6.
- Kennedy, Hugh (2006). When Baghdad Ruled the Muslim World: The Rise and Fall of Islam's Greatest Dynasty. Cambridge, MA: Da Capo Press. ISBN 978-0-306814808.
- Kraemer, Joel L., ed. (1989). The History of al-Ṭabarī, Volume XXXIV: Incipient Decline: The Caliphates of al-Wāthiq, al-Mutawakkil and al-Muntaṣir, A.D. 841–863/A.H. 227–248. SUNY Series in Near Eastern Studies. Albany, New York: State University of New York Press. ISBN 978-0-88706-874-4.
