= Hisar, Emirdağ =

Hisarköy
- Neighbourhood
- Location in Turkey Hisarköy (Turkey Aegean)
- Coordinates: 39.0207°N 31.2922°E
- Country: Turkey
- Province: Afyonkarahisar
- District: Emirdağ
- Municipality: Davulga
- Population (2021): 35
- Time zone: UTC+3 (TRT)

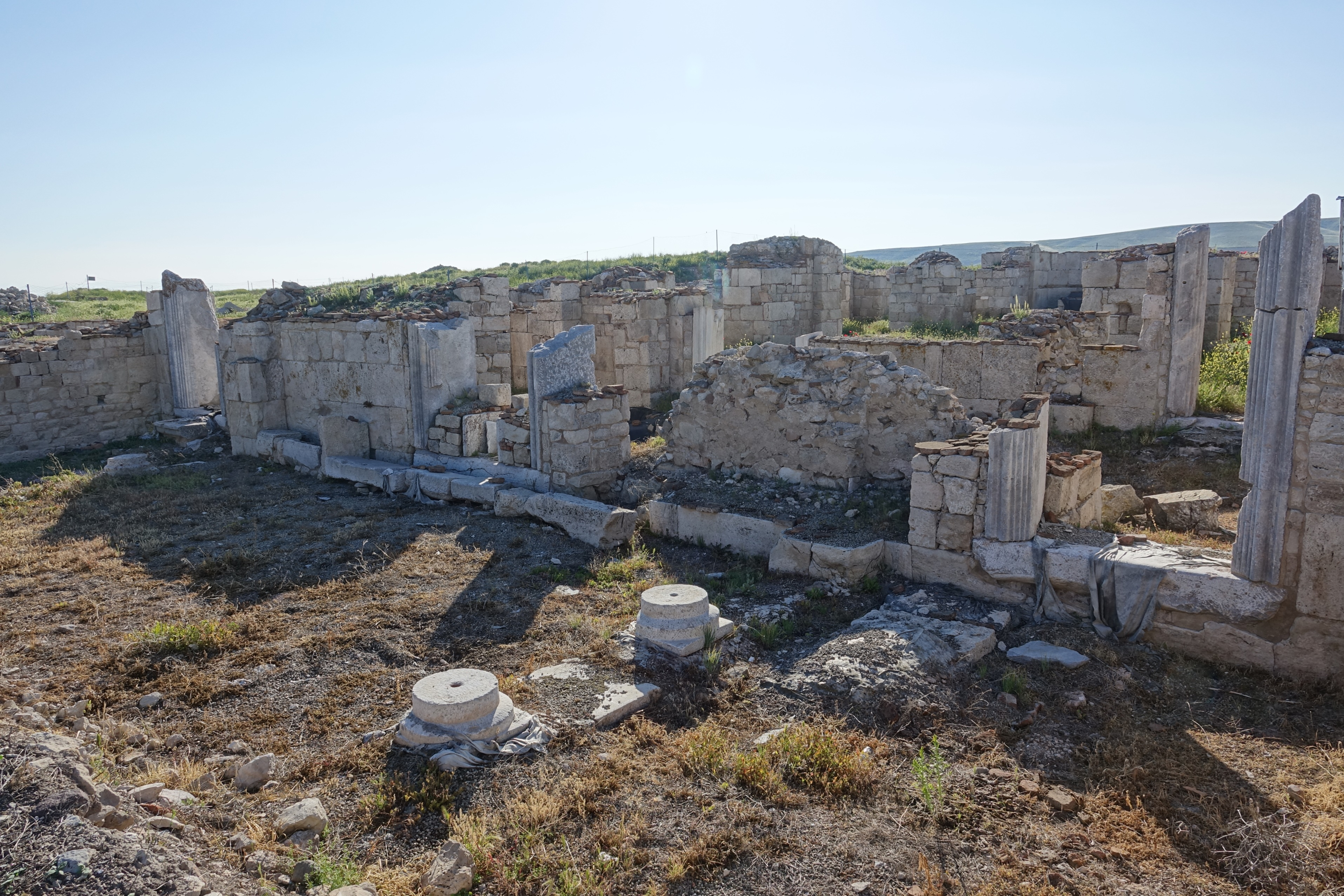
Ruins of Amorium

Hisarköy, colloquially called Hisar, is a neighbourhood of the town Davulga, Emirdağ District, Afyonkarahisar Province, Turkey. Its population is 35 (2021).

It is situated in the middle of the site of ancient and Byzantine Amorium. The village was founded in 1892 and spolia from Amorium were used to build it.
