= Amorium =

Ancient city in Phrygia, Asia Minor

- Ἀμόριον (Greek)
- Amorion, ʿAmmūriye, Amūrīn, Hergen Kale
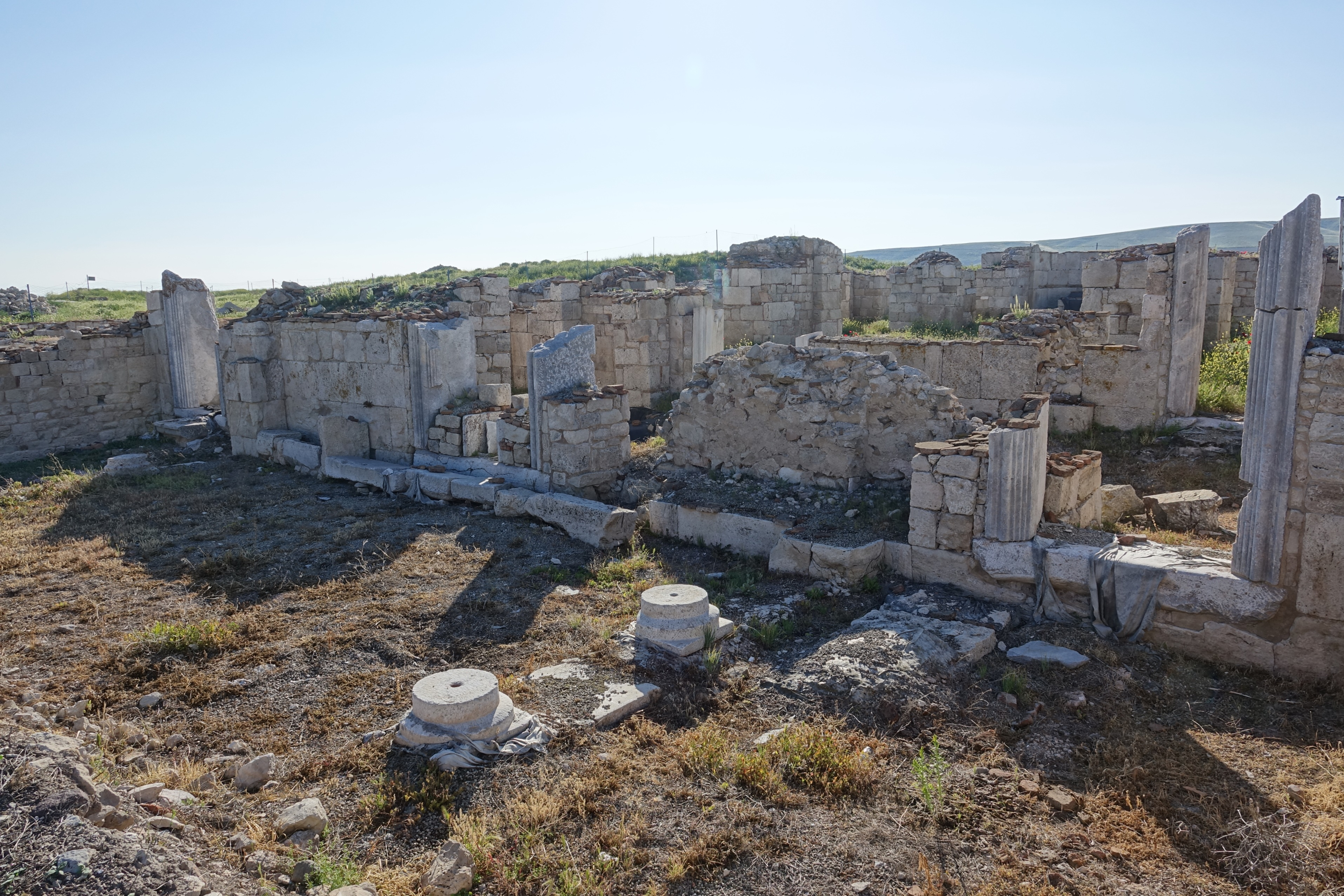
- Ruins of Amorium

- Location within Turkey
- 39°1′21″N 31°17′42″E
- Periods: Hellenistic to High Middle Ages
- Associated with: Aesop (legendarily), Michael II
- Location: Hisarköy, Afyonkarahisar Province, Turkey
- Region: Phrygia

History
- Event: Sack of Amorium

Amorium, also known as Amorion (Greek: Ἀμόριον), was a city in Phrygia, Asia Minor which was founded in the Hellenistic period, flourished under the Byzantine Empire, and declined after the Arab sack of 838. It was situated on the Byzantine military road from Constantinople to Cilicia. Its ruins and höyük ('mound, tumulus') are located under and around the modern village of Hisarköy, 13 kilometers east of the district center, Emirdağ, Afyonkarahisar Province, Turkey.

Arab/Islamic sources refer to the city as ʿAmmūriye (Arabic: عمورية). Under Ottoman rule, the site, which never regained importance, was called Hergen Kale or Hergen Kaleh.

== History ==
=== Antiquity ===
The city minted its own coins beginning between 133 BC to 27 BC until the 3rd century AD, indicating its maturity as a settlement and military importance during the pre-Byzantine period. Amorium then must have been prestigious and prosperous. But early historical records that mention the city are strictly limited to a reference by Strabo, although it is expected that new discoveries will shed light on the city's Roman period and before.

=== Byzantine period ===
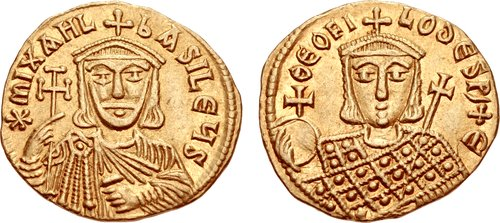
Gold solidus of Emperor Michael II the Amorian and his son Theophilos

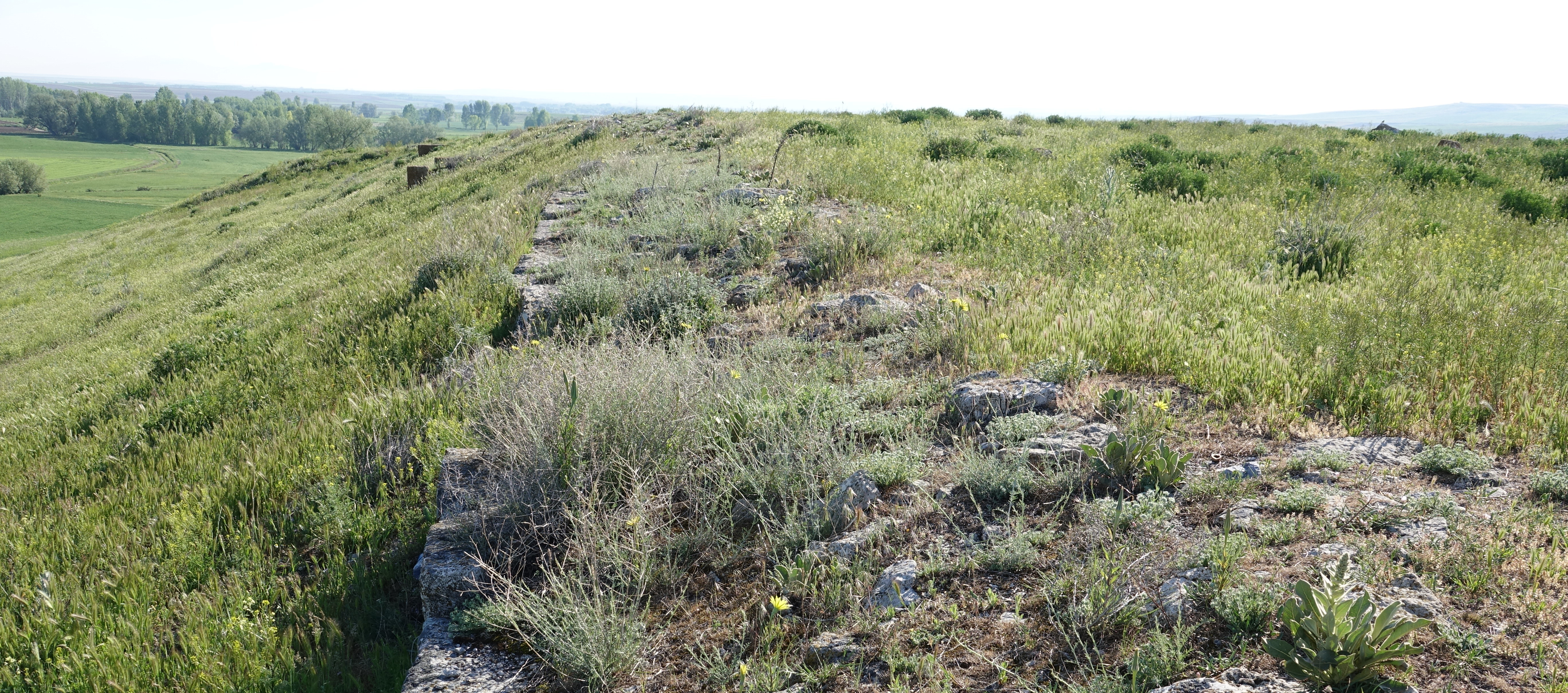
Ruins of the wall of Amorion

The city was fortified by the emperor Zeno in the 5th century, but did not rise to prominence until the 7th century. Its strategic location in central Asia Minor made the city a vital stronghold against the armies of the Umayyad Caliphate following the Muslim conquest of the Levant. The city was first attacked by Muawiyah I in 646. It capitulated to ‘Abd ar-Rahman ibn Khalid in 666 and was occupied by Yazid I in 669, then retaken by Constans II's general Andreas. Over the next two centuries, it remained a frequent target of Muslim raids (razzias) into Asia Minor, especially during the great sieges of 716 and 796. It became capital of the thema of Anatolikon soon after. In 742–743, it was the main base of Emperor Constantine V against the usurper Artabasdos, and in 820, an Amorian, Michael II, ascended the Byzantine throne, establishing the Amorian dynasty. This began the period of the city's greatest prosperity, when it became the largest city in Asia Minor. Its status however as the native city of the reigning dynasty also spelled its doom: in 838, the Caliph Al-Mu'tasim launched a campaign specifically against the city, which was captured and razed, an episode recounted in a poem of Abu Tammam.

The town was rebuilt, but was burned by Thamal al-Dulafi in 931. Nonetheless, it remained an active Byzantine city at least into the 11th century. In 1068 the Seljuks Afshin and Ahmedsah attacked Amorium, sacking the city and killing most of its inhabitants. Following the Battle of Manzikert, the city was devastated again by the Seljuks. Emperor Alexios I Komnenos defeated the Seljuks at Amorium in 1116.

It remained an important place in the 12th–14th centuries according to al-Idrisi and Hamdallah Mustawfi.

=== Bishopric ===
Amorium was a bishopric at latest by 431, when its bishop, Abraham or Ablabius, was at the Council of Ephesus. The acts of the earlier First Council of Constantinople (381) were signed by a priest, Tyrannus, of Amorium. Other bishops were Mysterius, who took part in the Council of Chalcedon in 451, Theodorus, in the Trullan Council of 692, Theodosius, in the Second Council of Nicaea in 787, and Bessarion in the Council of Constantinople (879). Theophilus was part of the mission that Photius sent to Rome about 20 years earlier.

In the Notitiae Episcopatuum of Pseudo-Epiphanius (c. 640), Amorium appears as a suffragan of Pessinus, capital of Galatia Salutaris. It appears with the same rank in another of the end of the 8th century. Soon afterwards, presumably as a result of citizens of Amorium taking the imperial throne, it became a metropolitan see with, as shown by the early 10th-century Notitiae Episcopatuum of Leo VI the Wise, five suffragan sees: Philomelium, Claneus, Docimium, Polybotus. and Pissia. There is no longer any mention of the see in the 14th-century Notitiae Episcopatuum.

No longer a residential bishopric, Amorium is today listed by the Catholic Church as a titular see.

=== 42 Martyrs ===
Following the 838 sack, 42 officers and notables of Amorium were taken as hostages to Samarra (today in Iraq). Refusing to convert to Islam, they were executed there in 845, and became canonized as the "42 Martyrs of Amorium".

== Excavations ==
Amorium's site was long unknown, though its name appears on many maps of the 18th and 19th centuries. It was rediscovered by Richard Pococke in 1739, but the first visit by a western scholar was by the English geologist William Hamilton in 1836; subsequently, maps placed it more accurately.

In 1987, Martin Harrison of Oxford University conducted a preliminary survey of the site, with excavations being started in 1988. From its inception the Amorium Excavations Project has been principally concerned with investigating post-classical, Byzantine Amorium. During 1989 and 1990, an intensive surface survey was conducted of the man-made mound in the upper city. In 2001, Ali Kaya made a geophysical survey of the church found in the upper city, although a full excavation has yet to be undertaken. The Project is sponsored by the British Institute of Archaeology at Ankara and funded by grants from various institutions in the United States including the Adelaide and Milton De Groot Fund at The Metropolitan Museum of Art and the Friends of Amorium.

After more than 20 years of British led excavation at Amorium, fieldwork restarted in 2014 with a new Turkish team under the direction of Doçent Doktor Zeliha Demirel Gökalp of Anadolu University, based at Eskisehir. Amorium Excavations Project retains its character of international collaboration with foreign institutions, like the Institute of Mediterranean Studies of Foundation for Research & Technology – Hellas.

== Notable people ==
- Aesop (620–560 BC), Greek fable writer, legendarily from Amorion
- Michael II "the Amorian" (770–829), Byzantine emperor and founder of the Amorian dynasty
- Saint Blaise of Amorion (died 908), Christian monk and saint

== Sources ==
- Foss, Clive (1991). "Amorion". In Kazhdan, Alexander (ed.). The Oxford Dictionary of Byzantium. Oxford and New York: Oxford University Press. pp. 79–80. ISBN 0-19-504652-8.
- Ivison, Eric A. (2007). "Amorium in the Byzantine Dark Ages (seventh to ninth centuries)". In Henning, Joachim (ed.). Post-Roman Towns, Trade and Settlement in Europe and Byzantium, Vol. 2: Byzantium, Pliska, and the Balkans. de Gruyter. pp. 25–59. ISBN 978-3-11-018358-0.
- Karolidis, Pavlos (1908). Η πόλις Αμόριον εν τη χριστιανική και μωαμεθανική ιστορία και ποιήσει [The city of Amorion in Christian and Mohammedan history and poetry] (in Greek). Athens: Τύποις Π. Δ. Σακελλαρίου.
- Yakupoğlu, Cevdet (2022). Malazgirt Savaşı Öncesi Anadolu'ya Yapılan Türk Akınları (in Turkish). Boğaziçi Yayınları.
- Lightfoot, Chris (2006). Amorium: A Byzantine City in Anatolia - An Archaeological Guide. Istanbul: Homer Kitabevi. ISBN 978-975-8293-80-3.
