= Ashinas =

Abbasid official and army commander (died 844)

Abu Ja'far Ashinas
- Native name: Ashinas
- Born: unknown
- Died: 17 or 19 December 844
- Allegiance: Abbasid Caliphate
- Branch: Abbasid Turkic guard
- Service years: c. 814/5 – 844
- Conflicts: Sack of Amorium
- Children: Musa

Abu Ja'far Ashinas (Arabic: أبو جعفر أشناس; died 17 or 19 December 844) was a general of the Abbasid caliph Al-Mu'tasim. One of the earliest and most prominent members of al-Mu'tasim's Turkic guard, he rose to become one of the leading figures of the empire under al-Mu'tasim, serving as a commander in the Amorium campaign, and playing a leading role in the purge of the old Abbasid elites that followed. He was also governor of Egypt from 834, as well as of the Levant and Upper Mesopotamia from 838 on, although in practice he appointed deputies to govern in his stead. Under al-Mu'tasim's successor al-Wathiq, his powers were extended further into a virtual viceroyalty over all western provinces of the caliphate.

== Origin and early career ==
According to the accounts of al-Ya'qubi and al-Tabari, Ashinas was one of the first slaves purchased by Abu Ishaq, the future al-Mu'tasim, for his Turkic guard, along with Itakh al-Khazari, Wasif, and Sima al-Dimashqi. Unlike later practice, whereby the slaves would be purchased in Central Asia, these four and other, unnamed early members of the guard were purchased in Baghdad in c. 814/5; Ashinas' original owner is given by al-Ya'qubi as Nu'aym ibn Khazim Abi Harun ibn Nu'aym. (Note: Nu'aym ibn Khazim is little known, except that he supported the anti-caliph Ibrahim ibn al-Mahdi against al-Ma'mun. According to C. E. Bosworth, he is likely to have been a brother of Khuzayma ibn Khazim, and hence scion of one of the most prominent families in the early Abbasid aristocracy (the abnāʾ al-dawla); in line with the rest of this social group, they appear to have opposed al-Ma'mun during the civil war.)

Al-Tabari mentions a fanciful story on how Ashinas received his name. In 819 Abu Ishaq commanded a force sent against some Kharijite rebels. During this campaign, one of the Turkic ghilmān placed himself between a Kharijite lancer and the future caliph, shouting, "Recognize me!" (in Persian "ashinas ma-ra"). To express his appreciation, Abu Ishaq on that same day granted this man the name "Ashinas". C. E. Bosworth suggests a Persian origin for the name, as it is attested among other Iranian people, and cites the linguist Ferdinand Justi's proposal for an origin from the root -shinās, "knowing, knower". On the other hand, the Sinologist Édouard Chavannes and the Turkish historian Emel Esin suggested a derivation from the Ashina tribe of the Göktürks, while Christopher Beckwith rejects this association.

Ashinas' family is also obscure; from his patronymic "Abu Ja'far", he had at least one son named Ja'far, but he is otherwise unknown. Al-Tabari, also refers to a Musa ibn Ashinas leading troops during the 865–866 civil war.

== Career under al-Mu'tasim ==
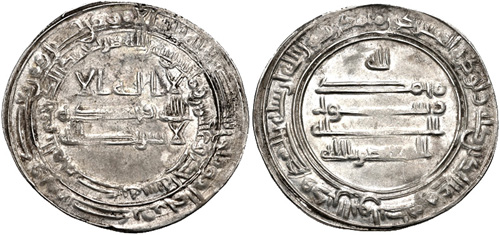
Silver dirham of al-Mu'tasim, minted at al-Muhammadiya in 836/7

During al-Mu'tasim's reign (833–842), Ashinas was, along with Itakh and al-Afshin, the prince of Usrushana, one of the most prominent men in the caliphate. Already in 834, he had been named governor of Egypt, a position held by al-Mu'tasim before his accession. As with his other provincial governorates later in his career, Ashinas did not govern directly, but appointed deputies as governors, while he remained in Iraq. During his 11 years as nominal governor in Egypt, Ashinas appointed four deputies to govern in his place.

When al-Mu'tasim founded Samarra as his new capital and residence in 836, Ashinas along with the other Turks received allotments in the western side of the new city, known as al-Karkh. There Ashinas built his own palace (Dar Ashinas). He is recorded as having a number of officers (quwwad) under his command, and they their own followers in turn. During the Amorium campaign of 838, he led the vanguard of the army, and was one of the chief commanders during the siege of the city.

The rise of men like Ashinas and the other Turks rankled with the traditional Abbasid elites, who saw their power being diminished in favour of these parvenus of servile origin. Their sullen and rebellious mood is conveyed by an anecdote in al-Tabari, of two of Ashinas' lieutenants, Amr al-Farghani and Ahmad ibn al-Khalil ibn Hisham, grumbling during the siege about being humbled by Ashinas, "this slave, the son of a whore", and that they would rather defect to the Byzantines than continue to serve under him. Amr and Ahmad became members of a conspiracy to overthrow al-Mu'tasim and replace him with his nephew, al-Ma'mun's son al-Abbas. Growing suspicious of their behaviour, Ashinas had them placed under house arrest. One of Amr's young servants, whom he had warned to stay inside his tent in case of disturbances, then went to the Caliph, and the plot was quickly uncovered. Ashinas took the lead in discovering and arresting the conspirators, along with his fellow Turks, Itakh and Bugha the Elder. This led to a major purge of the traditional establishment that had served the Abbasids until then: alongside al-Abbas, over 70 other commanders were executed.

The Turks in turn profited from the affair, and Ashinas most of all, thanks to the central role he played in its resolution. After the return from the Amorium campaign, Ashinas was given control of a super-governorate over the provinces of Egypt, which he already controlled, Syria and the Jazira. As he remained in Samarra and merely appointed resident governors in his name, in practical terms this most likely meant that Ashinas had control over the revenues of these provinces. Nevertheless, according to Hugh N. Kennedy, this move "represented a further centralizing of power, for the under-governors of the provinces seldom appeared at court and played little part in the making of political decisions". In 839, his daughter Utranja was wed to the son of al-Afshin in a lavish ceremony attended by the Caliph in person. Following the arrest of al-Afshin in 840, however, the couple were also arrested.

When al-Mu'tasim left Samarra for al-Sinn in 840, he appointed him as his deputy in the capital, and when he returned, he publicly placed him on a throne and conferred a ceremonial crown to him. When Ashinas participated in the Hajj of 841, he received honours on every stop of the route, and was hailed as the amir, or governor, of the provinces from Samarra to Mecca for the duration of his pilgrimage. According to Ibn al-Adim, al-Mu'tasim alone gave Ashinas 40 million silver dirham during the final years of his reign.

== Career under al-Wathiq and death ==
Caliph al-Wathiq repeated the coronation ceremony for Ashinas in Ramadan (June/July) 843, who on the occasion was invested with sweeping authority over the western provinces, from Samarra to the Maghreb—an act which the 15th-century Egyptian scholar al-Suyuti considered as the first occasion when royal power (sultan) was delegated to a subject. Ashinas died on 17 or 19 December 844, (Note: Al-Dhahabi reports that he died in AH 252 (866/867 CE), a date which is also mentioned by Ibn Taghribirdi who follows him. However, they are contradicted by the 9th- and 10th-century chroniclers al-Tabari, al-Kindi, and al-Ya'qubi, and by the fact that Ashinas disappears from the sources entirely after 844. The date reported by al-Dhahabi may, however, be the date of death of Ashina's son Musa.) at the height of his power; according to the 14th-century historian al-Dhahabi, although not corroborated in other sources, he left behind a fortune of 100,000 gold dinars, which was confiscated by the caliph. Little is known about the circumstances of his death, but, as Matthew Gordon comments, "if his death was brought on by illness or old age, then Ashinas was among a tiny number of prominent Samarran Turks who managed to avoid a violent end". His fellow Turks Itakh and Wasif rose to prominence after his death, with Itakh in particular succeeding Ashinas in his rank and his over-governorship of the western provinces. Ashinas' palace later became the residence of al-Fath ibn Khaqan, the chief confidante of Caliph al-Mutawakkil.

The future viziers Ahmad ibn al-Khasib and Sulayman ibn Wahb ibn Sa'id served in the role of secretary (katib) to Ashinas.

== Bibliography ==
- Bosworth, C. E., ed. (1987). The History of al-Ṭabarī, Volume XXXII: The Reunification of the ʿAbbāsid Caliphate: The Caliphate of al-Maʾmūn, A.D. 813–33/A.H. 198–213. SUNY Series in Near Eastern Studies. Albany, New York: State University of New York Press. ISBN 978-0-88706-058-8.
- Bosworth, C. E., ed. (1991). The History of al-Ṭabarī, Volume XXXIII: Storm and Stress Along the Northern Frontiers of the ʿAbbāsid Caliphate: The Caliphate of al-Muʿtasim, A.D. 833–842/A.H. 218–227. SUNY Series in Near Eastern Studies. Albany, New York: State University of New York Press. ISBN 978-0-7914-0493-5.
- Gordon, Matthew S. (2001). The Breaking of a Thousand Swords: A History of the Turkish Military of Samarra (A.H. 200–275/815–889 C.E.). Albany, New York: State University of New York Press. ISBN 0-7914-4795-2.
- Kennedy, Hugh (2001). The Armies of the Caliphs: Military and Society in the Early Islamic State. London and New York: Routledge. ISBN 0-415-25093-5.
- Kennedy, Hugh (2004) [1986]. The Prophet and the Age of the Caliphates: The Islamic Near East from the 6th to the 11th Century (Second ed.). Harlow: Longman. ISBN 978-0-582-40525-7.
- Kennedy, Hugh (2006). When Baghdad Ruled the Muslim World: The Rise and Fall of Islam's Greatest Dynasty. Cambridge, MA: Da Capo Press. ISBN 978-0-306814808.
- Kraemer, Joel L., ed. (1989). The History of al-Ṭabarī, Volume XXXIV: Incipient Decline: The Caliphates of al-Wāthiq, al-Mutawakkil and al-Muntaṣir, A.D. 841–863/A.H. 227–248. SUNY Series in Near Eastern Studies. Albany, New York: State University of New York Press. ISBN 978-0-88706-874-4.
- Vasiliev, A. A. (1935). Byzance et les Arabes, Tome I: La Dynastie d'Amorium (820–867) (in French). French ed.: Henri Grégoire, Marius Canard. Brussels: Éditions de l'Institut de Philologie et d'Histoire Orientales.
