= List of Zoroastrianism sects =

List of historical and modern sects within Zoroastrianism

Zoroastrianism has several sects and movements, each with distinct interpretations of its core tenets. These groups vary in their approaches to pluralism, dualism, and monotheism.

== Iranian Zoroastrian sects ==
=== Zurvanism ===
Zurvanism was a sect in which the deity Zurvan was considered the primordial creator deity and the father of both Ahura Mazda (Oromasdes) and Ahriman (Arimanius). The earliest evidence of the cult of Zurvan appears in the History of Theology attributed to Eudemus of Rhodes (c. 370–300 BCE). As cited in Damascius's sixth-century CE Difficulties and Solutions of First Principles, Eudemus described a sect of Persians who believed spacetime to be the ultimate source of the rival deities of Light (Ahura Mazda) and Darkness (Ahriman).

While Armenian and Syriac sources depict the religion of the Sasanian Empire as distinctly Zurvanite, later native Zoroastrian commentaries are primarily Mazdean. With only one exception (the 10th-century Denkard 9:30), these texts do not mention Zurvan. Among the remaining Pahlavi texts, only the Menog-i Khrad and the Selections of Zatspram (both 9th century) show a Zurvanite tendency. The latter is considered the latest Zoroastrian text providing evidence of the Zurvanite cult. The only native Persian source to substantiate foreign accounts of the Zurvanite doctrine is the 13th-century Ulema-i Islam (Persian: علماى اسلام, romanized: ʿUlamā‑yi Islām, lit. 'the scholars of Islam'), which was written by a Zoroastrian despite its title.

=== Manichaeism ===
Some scholars and researchers consider Manichaeism to be a branch of Zoroastrianism.

=== Mazdakism ===
Mazdakism, a dualistic faith, was founded by Zaradust-e Khuragen and later promulgated by the reformer Mazdak. Its tenets forbade the consumption of meat and the killing of animals.

=== Gayomarthians ===
The Gayomarthians believed that Ahriman originated from the doubt of Ahura Mazda, making him thereof. They also held that Gayomart was the first human. Maneckji Nusserwanji Dhalla described this doctrine as an attempt to mitigate Zoroastrianism's traditional dualism. Dhalla suggests this shift towards monotheism was a response to pressure from the monotheistic emphasis of Islam and to counter criticism from Muslims about the existence of two deities.

=== Behafaridians ===
The Behafaridians were followers of Behafarid, who led a religious peasant revolt incorporating elements of Zoroastrianism and Islam. Behafarid affirmed his belief in Zoroaster and maintained Zoroastrian institutions. His followers prayed seven times a day facing the Sun, forbade intoxicants, kept their hair long, and only permitted the sacrifice of decrepit cattle.

=== Saisanis ===
The Saisanis were followers of Ustadh Sis. This sect was reportedly very similar to the Behafaridians, with some sources suggesting little difference between them, though Ustadh Sis claimed prophethood for himself.

=== Khurramites ===
The Khurramites were a religio-political movement founded by the Persian Sunpadh. The movement's beliefs blended elements of Shia Islam, Mazdakism, and Zoroastrianism. A primary motivation for the Khurramite revolts was to avenge the execution of Abu Muslim al-Khurasani by the Abbasid Caliph Al-Mansur.

=== Azarkeivanian ===
The Azarkeivanian school was founded by Azar Kayvan. Scholar Jivanji Jamshedji Modi described the beliefs of Kayvan and his followers as a blend of Sufism and Indian Yoga practices, combined with a philosophy of Illuminationism.

== Armenian Zoroastrian sects ==
In the Armenian form of Zoroastrianism, Aramazd was the chief creator god, analogous to Ahura Mazda. He was considered a beneficent god of fertility, rain, and abundance, and the father of other deities such as Anahit, Mihr, and Nane. Aramazd was typically viewed as the father of the gods and rarely depicted with a consort, though he is sometimes identified as the husband of Anahit or Spandaramet.

Armenian Zoroastrianism incorporated native Armenian deities, who functioned as Yazatas. It was often practiced secretively. Mary Boyce cites a Zoroastrian magus describing the distinct nature of Armenian practices: "We do not worship the years of the earth like you, the sun and the moon, the winds and the fire."

=== Shamsīyah ===
Shamsīyah is a mysterious religious sect found in Armenia and Mesopotamia, and it is believed that they are remnants of the Mazdakite sect.

== Neo-Zoroastrian movements ==
=== Mazdaznan ===
Mazdaznan is a neo-Zoroastrian religion founded in the late 19th century by Otoman Zar-Adusht Ha'nish (born Otto Haenisch). Characterized by some as a revival of 6th-century Mazdakism, Mazdaznan teaches that the Earth should be restored to a paradise where humanity can commune with God. Adherents typically follow a vegetarian diet and engage in specific breathing exercises, known as "Gah-Llama," to achieve personal health. The name Mazdaznan is said to derive from Persian "Mazda" and "Znan," meaning "master thought."

== Bibliography ==
- Canepa, Matthew (2018). The Iranian Expanse: Transforming Royal Identity Through Architecture, Landscape, and the Built Environment, 550 BCE–642 CE. Oakland: University of California Press. ISBN 9780520379206.
- Ellerbrock, Uwe (2021). The Parthians: The Forgotten Empire. Oxford: Routledge. ISBN 978-0367481902.
- Frenschkowski, Marco (2015). "Christianity". In Stausberg, Michael; Vevaina, Yuhan Sohrab-Dinshaw; Tessmann, Anna (eds.). The Wiley Blackwell Companion to Zoroastrianism. John Wiley And Sons Ltd. pp. 457–477.
- La Porta, Sergio (2018). "Zoroastrianism, Armenian". In Nicholson, Oliver (ed.). The Oxford Dictionary of Late Antiquity. Oxford: Oxford University Press. ISBN 978-0-19-866277-8.
- Russell, James R. (2005). "Armenian mythology". The Oxford Companion to World Mythology. Oxford: Oxford University Press. ISBN 978-0-19991-648-1.
- Boyce, Mary (2001). Zoroastrians: Their Religious Beliefs and Practices. Psychology Press. ISBN 978-0415239035.
