= Religious influences on Zoroastrianism =

The idea that Zoroastrianism and its beliefs and practices have been influenced by other religions, including the Babylonian and Hellenistic religions, Judaism, and Islam, has been put forward by many scholars, like James Darmesteter,

== Influence of Elamite religion ==
Mary Boyce has suggested that the prominence of Humban in the Neo-Elamite period influenced the position of Ahura Mazda in later religious traditions of the Persians. In the Persepolis Administrative Archives, Humban appears more commonly than any other Elamite or Persian deity, with a total of 26 mentions, compared to only 10 for Auramazdā, an early form of Ahura Mazda. Overall he received the most offerings of all deities attested in textual sources. The amount of grain offered to him by the Achaemenid administration was more than thrice as big as that offered to Auramazdā. Offerings to him are designated as bakadaušiyam in multiple cases.

Wouter F. M. Henkelman suggests that, in this period, he should be regarded as a Persian god, rather than a strictly Elamite one, and that the references to the bakadaušiyam of Humban are likely to reflect his popularity and status as a royal god. This Elamite term is a loan from Old Persian, and can be translated as "(feast) of the offering to (a) god", and likely designated a public feast. Similar celebrations are attested only for a small number of other deities.

== Influence of Ancient Iranian religion ==
Ahura Mazda is a very ancient deity that precedes Zoroastrianism. As is common in new religions, when founding his faith, Zoroaster utilized this established name to designate the supreme God. The abstract name Mazda predates Zoroastrianism, and even the fundamental role assigned to this deity in Mazdeism is not a Zoroastrian innovation. Henrik Samuel Nyberg suggests that none of the essential characteristics of Zoroastrianism are present in the fundamental structures of the Achaemenid religion. The Achaemenid religion lacked any of the technical terms from the circle of Zoroaster, any distinct ideas characteristic of the Gathas, and any specific beliefs or practices unique to the Zoroastrian faith. He therefore concludes that the foundational background of the Achaemenid religion is the Ancient Iranian religion.

Though Achaemenid texts use of the terms Mazdayasna (Mazda-worshipper) and Ahura Mazda, they do not mention Zoroaster, nor is there any other indication that these inscriptions denote a Zoroastrian character. Jacques Duchesne-Guillemin writes, "It seems simpler to think that the Achaemenids had never heard of Zoroaster or his religious reforms."

== Influence of Babylonian and Greek religions ==
=== Emergence of Zurvanism ===
Some scholars believe that the emergence of Zurvanism was due to the contact of Zoroastrianism with the Babylonian and Greek religions, but also some believe that Zurvan was a god of the Medes religion and his worship continued in Zoroastrianism.

== Influence of Judaism ==
=== Zoroaster and Jews ===
Various Jewish and Christian traditions exist regarding a connection between Zoroaster and the Jews; these traditions are divided into two categoriesthose that view Zoroaster negatively and those that view him positively.

Several Jewish and Christian traditions recorded in the Book of the Bee state that Zoroaster was Baruch, but he changed his name to Zoroaster. Theodore bar Konai identified him as an Israelite from the city of Samaria who had been taken captive during the Assyrian exile. Muslim scholars from among the People of the Book reported that he was a disciple of the Prophet Jeremiah, Elijah, or Ezra.

Thomas Hyde viewed Zoroaster positively, regarding him as a religious reformer who had studied under Jewish prophets such as Ezra the Scribe. Humphrey Prideaux noted that Zoroaster possessed extensive knowledge of Judaism and its sacred scriptures, leading him to surmise that Zoroaster was either Jewish by birth or a follower of the Jewish faith; however, Prideaux held a negative view of Zoroaster, regarding him as one of history's greatest impostors and false prophets.

The Arabic encyclopedia states that Zoroaster studied under the prophets of the Children of Israel but rejected the belief in Judaism.

=== Saoshyant ===
Dr. Ardeshir Khorshedian, a Mobad and the head of the Mobidan Association of Tehran, said the idea of the Zoroastrian Saoshyant as a Messiah figure likely came from Judaism, and became more prevalent following the Islamic conquest of Persia. Mobad Cyrus Niknam, a writer and researcher of ancient Iranian culture, says the idea of Saoshyant as a savior stems from the interpretations of Sasanian priests and is not supported by the teachings of Zoroaster himself. He says the name means benefactor of the holy. Dina G. McIntyre, an Indian Zoroastrian woman and a specialist in the study of the Gathas, sais the existence of a savior only appeared in later literature.

Farhang Mehr has said that the miracles attributed in the Pahlavi texts to Ashu Zarathustra or to the saviors after him, as well as his dialogues with Ahura Mazda and Amesha Spenta, do not exist in the Gathas but come from the Denkard, composed in the 10th century, centuries after the demise of the Sassanids. He suggests Zoroastrianism began to attribute miracles to Zoroaster that were on par with the miracles of the Abrahamic prophets in order to compete with the growing political supremacy of the Abrahamic faiths.

=== Zoroaster's life stories ===
Jamsheed K. Choksy states that contact between Zoroastrians and their Jewish and Christian neighbors in the Achaemenian, Arsacid, and Sasanian states influenced the hagiography or sacred biography of Zoroaster. Drawing on events in the Gathas, the stories of Zoroaster's life developed themes similar to those of Moses and Jesus. Between the 7th and 13th centuries, this hagiography also developed several parallels with the life of Muhammed. This hagiography was thus included in the Zardošt-nāma and Dēnkard. As Zoroastrians were a minority among Muslims, Christians and Hindus, the parallels in these stories provided a source of common ground, especially as dimmi under Islam.

In the 19th century, visual representations of Zoroaster incorporated Mithraic, Platonic and Ptolemaic motifs, in part drawing from Raphael Santi's earlier, Italian Renaissance-era portrait of the prophet. These representations remain popular today.

Philippe Gignoux argues that the Zoroastrian traditions attributing miracles to Zoroaster are of recent origin, having been composed to compete with Judaism, Christianity, and Islam and incorporating elements borrowed from these religions.

== Influence of Christianity ==
=== Parsis ===
In 1860s and 1870s, the linguist Martin Haug interpreted Zoroastrian scripture in Christian terms, and compared the yazatas to the angels of Christianity. In this scheme, the Amesha Spentas are the archangel retinue of Ahura Mazda, with the hamkars as the supporting host of lesser angels.

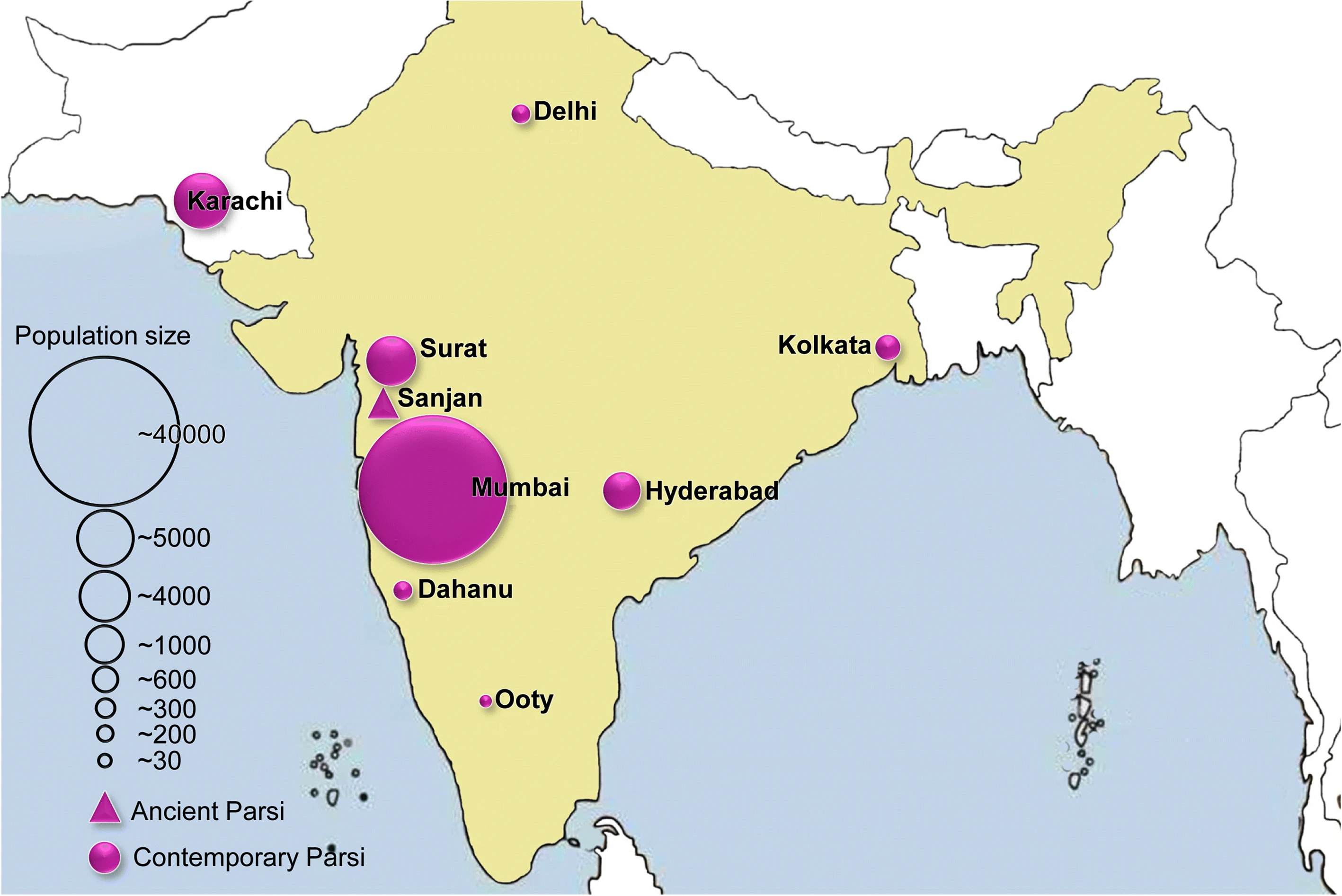
The geographical population distribution of modern and ancient Parsi.

At the time Haug wrote his translations, the Parsi (i.e., Indian Zoroastrian) community was under intense pressure from English and American missionaries, who severely criticized the Zoroastrians for—as John Wilson portrayed it in 1843—"polytheism", which the missionaries argued was inferior to their own "monotheism". At the time, Zoroastrianism lacked theologians of its own, and so the Zoroastrians were poorly equipped to make their own case. In this situation, Haug's counter-interpretation came as a welcome relief, and was (by and large) gratefully accepted as legitimate.

Haug's interpretations were subsequently disseminated as Zoroastrian ones, which then eventually reached the west where they were seen to corroborate Haug. Like most of Haug's interpretations, this comparison is today so well entrenched that a gloss of 'yazata' as 'angel' is almost universally accepted; both in publications intended for a general audience as well as in (non-philological) academic literature.

Mary Boyce noted that the theories of the Western Academy had a profound impact on the Parsis in mumbay and mentioned M. Haug proposal regarding the Amesha Spentas, which states that they are merely attributes of Ahura Mazda. This was welcomed by the Parsi reformers, who were under attack from Christian missionaries who accused them of polytheism. These reformers strongly promoted Haug's ideas, and Western scholars considered their writings as evidence that Hogg's interpretation had a real echo in the Zoroastrian tradition itself. also noted that some reformers have adopted the belief that Ahura Mazda is the father of Ahriman and Amesha Spenta, and this is a belief invented by M. Haug

Jenny Rose notes that the Parsis were in harmony with Christianity, likening Zoroaster to Jesus and attributing miracles to him.

Pakistani Zoroastrian priest and religious scholar Maneckji Nusserwanji Dhalla says that when the Parsis tried to defend their religion from the criticisms of Christian missionaries, they resorted to metaphorical interpretation instead of defending beliefs, such as saying that Ahriman was a symbol of blasphemy and not a living entity, and that purification rituals were a metaphorical expression of the internal purification of man.

Also added that the Parsi conservatives accused the Parsi reformists of trying to transform Zoroastrianism into a Protestant sect under the influence of Christianity

Jean Kellens criticized the Zoroastrian tradition regarding the history of the Avesta, describing it as insufficiently documented. He pointed to historians' statements about the Magi, stating that they did not have a holy book, in addition to the fact that writing was not widespread among the Achaemenids, and the scarcity of written documents. He added that recent research has proven that the Avesta was not written during the Parthian Empire, and that the available manuscripts indicate that it was written during the Sassanian era. He pointed out that the Zoroastrian tradition regarding the composition of the Avesta dates back to its emergence as a competition with Buddhism, Manichaeism, and Christianity, which rely on their own holy books

Philip G. Kreyenbroek stated that the concept of a "holy book" was new to the Sassanids, and that its existence was intended to compete with Christianity and Manichaeism. Jenny Rose points out that the Parsi sect in India made Zoroaster a figure like Jesus Christ, attributing miracles to him and considering him a prophet.

Morton Smith rejected the idea of a Zoroastrian influence on the Bible, arguing that the evidence for such an influence is weak and relies on scattered, isolated details, he further noted that the relevant Persian sources are of a later date, whereas the influence of Judaism and Christianity upon Iran and the historical precedence of these traditions is much more significant.

== Influence of Islam ==
The Danish Orientalist Arthur Christensen, in his book Iran During the Sassanid Era, said that Sasanian-era Old Persian sources that refer to Zoroastrian doctrine do not match the sources that appeared after the collapse of the state, such as the Pahlavi sources and others. He suggests that because of the fall of the Sasanian state, the Zoroastrian clerics modified their religion to better resemble Islam in order to retain followers and prevent their religion becoming extinct. Dr. Kersey Antia and Ali A. Jafarey, one of the founders of the Zoroastrian Society of Los Angeles, have also stated that Pahlavi texts were subjected to foreign influence.

According to Gherardo Gnoli, the Islamic conquest of Persia caused a huge impact on the Zoroastrian doctrine:

After the Islamic conquest of Persia and the migration of many Zoroastrians to India and after being exposed to Islamic and Christian propaganda, the Zoroastrians, especially the Parsis in India, went so far as to deny dualism and consider themselves completely monotheists. After several transformations and developments, one of the distinctive features of the Zoroastrian religion gradually faded away and almost disappeared from modern Zoroastrianism.

Maneckji Nusserwanji Dhalla described the doctrine of the Gayomarthians sect as another attempt to mitigate the dualism within Zoroastrianism. This was, he said, due to the Prophet Muhammad's emphasis on monotheism and the Muslims' mockery of the doctrine of worshipping two gods, which made the Zoroastrians view dualism as a defect, adopting monotheism and leading to sectarian divisions. He says the Zoroastrians attempted to establish a monotheistic belief by diminishing the importance of Ahriman, including that Ahura Mazda and Ahriman were created from time, or that Ahura Mazda himself allowed the existence of evil, or that Ahriman was a corrupt angel who rebelled against Ahura Mazda, citing a Persian book from the 15th century in which it is written that the Magi (Zoroastrians) believe that Allah and Iblis are brothers as evidence. Asad Seif suggests that following the Islamic conquest of Iran, Iranians began to Islamic figures with those from Zoroastrianism, such as equating Zoroaster with Abraham and Jamshid with Solomon.

According to Philippe Gignoux, Book 4 of the Denkard is "clearly nationalist and Persian in orientation, expressing the hope of a Mazdean restoration in the face of Islam and its Arab supporters".

=== Prayer ===
Religious historian Khaled Kabir Allal suggests that Zoroastrianism originally had only three prayers: at sunrise, at midday, and at sunset. He cites Muslim historians and researchers of the Avesta, the holy book of the Zoroastrians, who mention three prayers. He states that the current five daily prayers among Zoroastrians are a result of the influence of Islam, like Behafaridians.

The munajat, an Arabic word for the supplication tradition of prayers, evolved relatively late in the 13th century and shows Islamic influence. In contrast to more traditional forms of prayer, which are usually in Avestan, monajat prayers are performed in the native language of the faithful, typically in Persian or Gujarati for Iranian and Indian Zoroastrians, respectively. They take diverse forms and can be composed in verse or in prose.

=== Syncretic religious movements ===
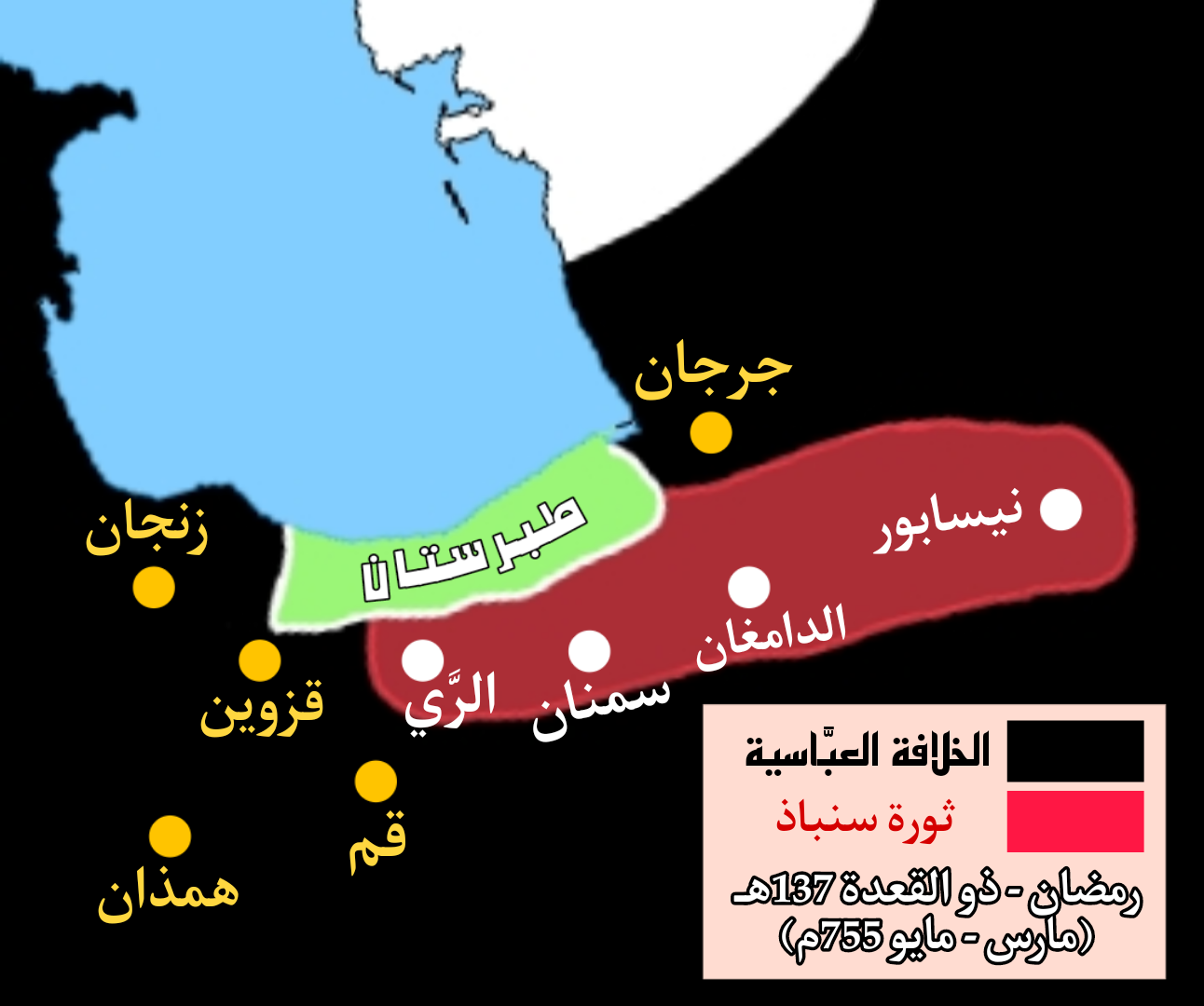
A map showing Sinbadh's revolt against the Abbasid Caliphate in 137 AH / 755 AD, which ended with the victory of the Abbasids and the elimination of his followers. When Sinbadh fled to Tabaristan, he was killed by a relative of Asbahbadh, the ruler of Tabaristan.

Abbasid Caliphate Sinbadh's revolt

Autonomous region of Tabaristan

Several religious movements have developed from Zoroastrian and Islamic influences, including:

- Behafaridians: Behafarid was an 8th-century Persian Zoroastrian heresiarch who started the Behafaridians, a religious peasant revolt with elements from Zoroastrianism and Islam. He believed in Zoroaster and upheld all Zoroastrian institutions. His followers prayed seven times a day facing the sun, prohibited intoxicants, and kept their hair long and disallowed sacrifices of cattle except when they were decrepit.
- Ustadh Sis: The Ustadh Sis movement is considered a continuation of the Bhavrid movement, where he claimed prophethood and launched a revolution, but was also suppressed.
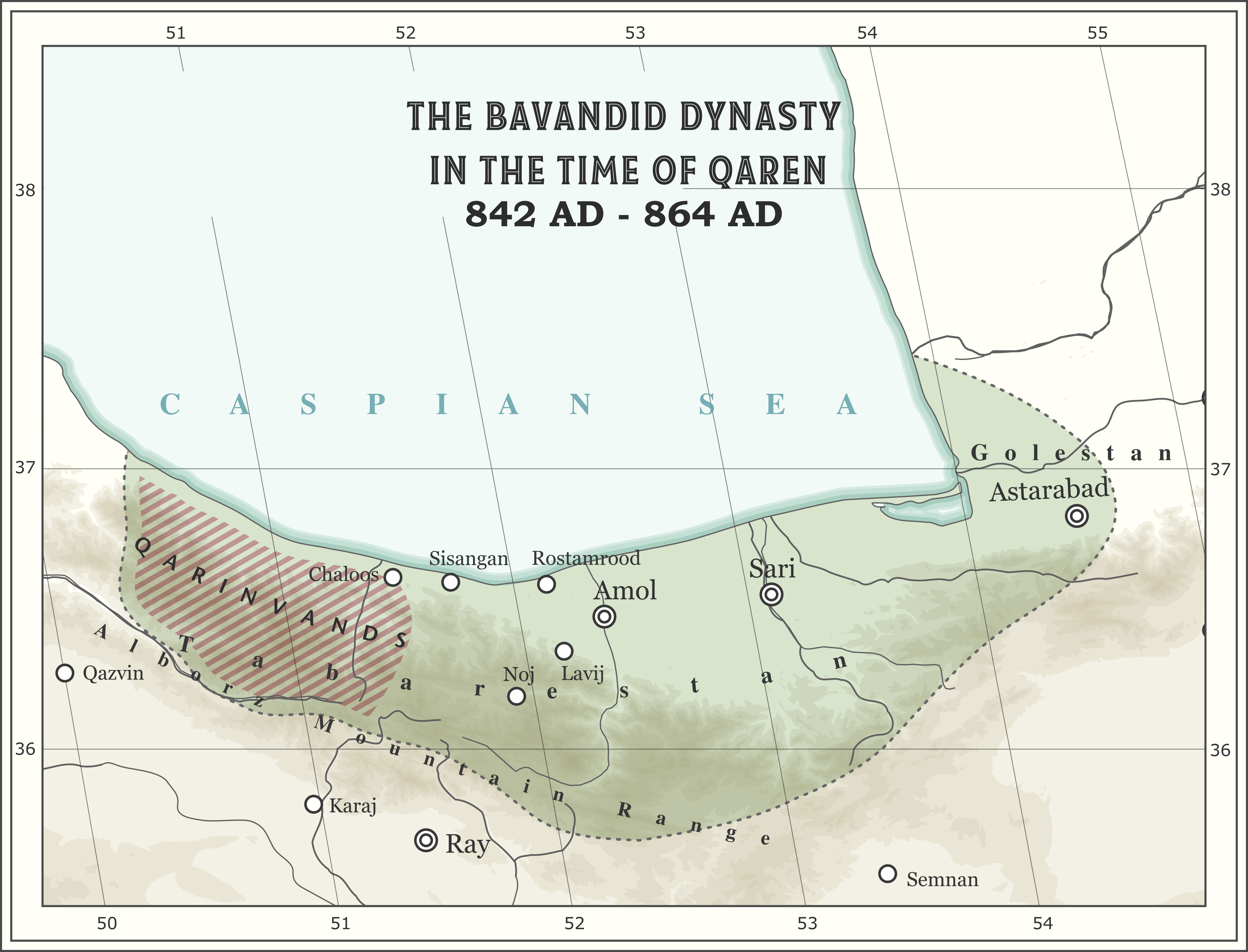
  This is a map of the Bavand Dynasty during Qaren I's, it mainly portrays the period in between his conversion to islam and his defeat by teh Zaydi Alids in 864.
- Khurramites: The Khurramites were founded by the Persian Sunpadh al-Majusi, who was a follower of Abu Muslim al-Khurasani. The Khurramites are a mixture of Muslim Shia and Zoroastrian Mazdakism; one of the most important reasons for the Khurramite revolt was revenge for the execution of Abu Muslim al-Khurasani, who was killed by Abu Jaafar al-Mansur.
- Babak Khorramdin: Babak Khorramdin was an Iranian leader who founded his own sect that was a mixture of Zoroastrianism, Islam, and other religions.
- Al-Muqanna: Al-Muqanna was a Persian prophet, who led a revolt in that province against the Abbasid Caliph al-Mahdi. Al-Muqnad preached a doctrine that combined elements of Islam and Zoroastrianism, and he continued the war for nearly three years in the field and an additional two years in his fortress at Sanam before he was finally defeated and committed suicide.
- Azarkeivanian: Azarkeivanian is a Zoroastrianism sect that emerged in the Safavid state, founded by Azar Kayvan, who was a student of Shihab ad-Din Suhrawardi. The beliefs of Kayvan and his disciples were somewhat Sufist with a mixture of Illuminationism and some Indian practices of yoga.

== Influence of Hinduism ==
Fasting in Zoroastrianism is forbidden because it weakens the body and that is sinful, and many followers dislike fasting, but the Parsees were influenced by the Hindus, who took the idea of fasting at a funeral.

While comparing Iranian Zoroastrianism with the Parsis, Shahin Bakhradnia, a Zoroastrian and the granddaughter of a priest, suggested that the Parsis were influenced by the cultures around them, such as the practice of scattering ashes in the temple, prostration, and kissing, which she said were likely borrowed from Hinduism.

== Sources ==
- Dhalla, Maneckji Nusserwanji (1914), Zoroastrian Theology, New York: OUP
- Edwards, E. (1927), "Sacrifice (Iranian)", in Hastings, James (ed.), Encyclopedia of Religion and Ethics, vol. XI, Edinburgh: T & T Clark
- Gray, Louis H. (1927), "Jews in Zoroastrianism", in Hastings, James (ed.), Encyclopedia of Religion and Ethics, vol. VII, Edinburgh: T & T Clark
- Luhrmann, Tanya M. (August 2002), "Evil in the Sands of Time: Theology and Identity Politics among the Zoroastrian Parsis", The Journal of Asian Studies, 61 (3): 861–889, doi:10.2307/3096349, ISSN 0021-9118, JSTOR 3096349, S2CID 163092265
- Benveniste, Émile (1929). The Persian Religion According to the Chief Greek Texts. Paris: University of Paris. [Note: Translated into Persian by Bahman Sarkarati as Din-e Irani, Tehran: Bonyad-e Farhang-e Iran, 1975 (1354 SH).]
- Nyberg, Henrik Samuel (1938). Die Religionen des alten Iran. Leipzig: J. C. Hinrichs. [Note: Translated into Persian by Seyfoddin Najmabadi as Din-haye Iran-e Bastan, Tehran: Iranian Center for the Study of Cultures, 1980 (1359 SH).]
- Yamauchi, Edwin M. (1990). Persia and the Bible. Grand Rapids: Baker Book House. [Note: Translated into Persian by Manouchehr Pezeshk as Iran va Ketab-e Moghaddas, Tehran: Qoqnoos, 2011 (1390 SH).]
