= Iranian religions =

Religions that originated in the Iranian plateau

Faravahar, one of the most prominent symbols of Zoroastrianism and Iranian culture

The Iranian religions, also known as the Persian religions, are, in the context of comparative religion, a grouping of religious movements that originated in the Iranian plateau, which accounts for the bulk of what is called "Greater Iran" and form a subset of Middle Eastern religions.

== Background ==
The beliefs, activities, and cultural events of the Persians in ancient Persia are complex matters. Persians made references to a combination of several Aryans and non-Aryan tribes. The documented history of Persian religions begins with Zoroastrianism. The prophet Zoroaster reformed the early beliefs of ancient Persians, the reconstructed Ancient Iranian religion, into a form of henotheism/monotheism. The Gathas, hymns of Zoroaster's Avesta, introduced monotheistic ideas to Persia, while through the Yashts and Yasna, mentions are made of polytheism and earlier creeds. The Vedas and the Avesta have both served researchers as important resources in discovering early Proto-Indo-Iranian religious beliefs and ideas, from which the later indigenous religions of the Iranian and Indo-Aryan peoples evolved.

== Antiquity ==
- Ancient Iranian religion: The ancient religion of the Iranian peoples.
  - Scythian religion: The religion of the Scythians and precursor to modern Assianism. Some researchers further speculate that Daevas may partly be based on Scythian gods, hence further influences across Iranian religions as a whole.
- Zoroastrianism: The present-day umbrella term for the indigenous native beliefs and practices of the Iranian peoples. While present-day Zoroastrianism is monolithic, a continuation of the elite form of the Sasanian Empire, in antiquity it had several variants or denominations, differing slightly by location, ethnic affiliation and historical period. It once had large population and high diversity.
  - Zurvanism: By the late Achaemenid Empire, Zoroastrianism was also evident as Zurvanism (Zurvanite Zoroastrianism), a monist dualism that had a following as late as the Sasanian Empire.
  - Mazdakism: A late-5th or early-6th century proto-socialist, gnostic offshoot of Zoroastrianism that sought to do away with private property.
- Mithraism: A mystery religion centred around the proto-Zoroastrian Persian god Mithras that was widely practised in the Roman Empire from about the 1st to the 4th centuries.
- Manichaeism: A 3rd century dualist religion that may have been influenced by Mandaeism. Manichaeans believe in a "Father of Greatness" (Aramaic: Abbā dəRabbūṯā, Persian: pīd ī wuzurgīh) and observe Him to be the highest deity (of light).
- Yazidism: A monotheistic ethnic religion that originated in Kurdistan and has roots in pre-Zoroastrian Iranian religion, directly derived from the Indo-Iranian tradition.

== Medieval ==
Some religionists made syncretic teachings of Islam and local beliefs and cults such as Iranian paganism, Zurvanism, Manichaeism and Zoroastrianism.

- The early Islamic period saw the development of Persian mysticism, a traditional interpretation of existence, life and love with Perso-Islamic Sufi monotheism as its practical aspect. This development believed in a direct perception of spiritual truth (God), through mystic practices based on divine love.
- Khurramites, a 9th-century religious and political movement based on the 8th century teachings of Sunpadh, who preached a syncretism of Shia Islam and Zoroastrianism. Under Babak Khorramdin, the movement sought the redistribution of private wealth and the abolition of Islam.
- Behafaridians, an 8th-century cult movement around the prophet Behafarid. Although the movement is considered to have its roots in Zoroastrianism, Behafarid and his followers were executed on charges (made by Zoroastrians) of harm to both Zoroastrianism and Islam.
- Yarsanism, a religion which is believed to have been founded in the late 14th century. The basis of faith is belief in one God, who manifests in 1 primary form and 6 secondary ones, and together they are the Holy Seven.
- Druze faith: an esoteric, monotheistic ethnic religion whose tenets include reincarnation and the eternity of the soul. It was founded by the Persian Hamza ibn Ali ibn Ahmad, an Ismaili mystic from Khorasan, and another important early preacher and 'prophet' of the religion was the Persian ad-Darazi, after whom the religion has taken its name.

== Modern ==
- Assianism, revival of Ossetian ethnic religion (see: Ossetian mythology).
- Roshanniya Movement, a set of monotheistic teachings of Pir Roshan which his people followed.
- Bábism, a 19th century messianic movement founded by the Báb.
- Baháʼí Faith, an emerging Abrahamic monotheistic religion founded by Bahá'u'lláh in the 19th century.

== See also ==
- Religion of Iranian-Americans
- Dabestan-e Mazaheb

== Bibliography ==
- Alessandro Bausani, Religion in Iran: From Zoroaster to Bahaullah, Bibliotheca Persica, 2000
- Richard Foltz, Religions of Iran: From Prehistory to the Present, London: Oneworld, 2013.
