= Ishaq al-Turk =

8th-century rebel leader against the Abbasids

Ishaq al-Turk was an Iranian rebel who started a rebellion in Khorasan against the Abbasid Caliphate, after the murder of Abu Muslim. Ishaq was a Zoroastrian, or a Khurramite.

After Abu Muslim's murder at the orders of al-Mansur, Ishaq fled to Transoxania, and declared a revolt on al-Mansur. He claimed that Abu Muslim was a prophet who was sent to reform Zoroastrianism, thus starting one of many movements claiming prophethood or divinity for Abu Muslim. He also claimed descent from Yahya ibn Zayd. The Abbasid ruler of Khorasan had him captured and executed. His group continued to be known as al-Muslimiyya (followers of Abu Muslim Khorasani), and constitute the fundamental ideology of the sect well known as Bābak’iyyāh in the future.

He received the sobriquet "Turk" because of his frequent visits among the Turks of Transoxania.

== See also ==
- Bihafarid
- Ustadh Sis
- Mazdak
- Khurramites
- Sunpadh
- al-Muqanna
- Babak Khorramdin
- Afshin
- Maziar
