= Veiled Prophet =

(The) Veiled Prophet may refer to:

- Al-Muqanna (fl. 755–783), Iranian religious leader
- "The Veiled Prophet of Khorassan", a poem from the 1817 romance Lalla-Rookh by Thomas Moore, loosely based on the life of Al-Muqanna
- The Veiled Prophet (opera), an 1877 romantic opera by Charles Villiers Stanford, based on the Moore poem
- Veiled Prophet Parade and Ball, annual celebratory events formerly held in St. Louis, Missouri
- The Veiled Prophet (novel), a 2007 novel by Richard A. Knaak, set in the Diablo video game universe
