= Ustadh Sis =

8th-century Persian anti-Abbasid rebel leader

- Died: Abbasid Caliphate
- Cause of death: Execution (ordered by Al-Mansur)
- Criminal charges: Rebellion against State (Treason)
- Penalty: Death penalty

Details
- Victims: unknown
- Date: c. 767
- Killed: unknown

Ustadh Sis (also spelled: Ustad Sis, or Ostad Sis, Persian: استاد سیس) was a Persian heresiarch and anti-Abbasid rebel leader. It is speculated that he was once a governor of Khorasan and possibly father to Al-Ma'mun’s Iranian mother, Marajil, which would make him Ma'mūn's maternal grandfather.

Based in the eastern fringe of Khorasan, in the mid-8th century he claimed he was a prophet of God and managed to gain followers among the villagers in that area. Many were previously followers of Bihafarid, (Behafaridians) whom the Abbasid commander, Abu Muslim, had crushed militarily.

== Reinvigoration of Bihafarid's movement ==
Ustadh Sis launched a rebellion in 767, purportedly with 300,000 fighting men. His initial base was the mountainous region of Badghis, and he soon occupied Herat and Sistan before marching towards Merv. He initially defeated an Abbasid army under the command of al-Ajtham of Merv, but was then defeated in a bloody battle against an army led by Muhammad ibn Abdallah, the son of the Caliph al-Mansur (and a future Caliph).

According to al-Tabari, 70,000 of Ustadh Sis's followers were killed in the battle and 14,000 were taken captive. Ustadh Sis managed to flee to the mountains, but Abbasid general Khazim ibn Khuzayma al-Tamimi followed him and was able to capture him. Ustadh Sis was sent in chains to al-Mansur, who ordered his execution. Later, al-Mahdi gave an amnesty to the 30,000 captives.

== See also ==
- Ishaq al-Turk
- Sunpadh
- al-Muqanna
- Mazdak
- Khurramites
