= List of Persian figures in the Sasanian era =

Below is a list of important Persian figures in the Sassanid Empire (226-651):

== List ==
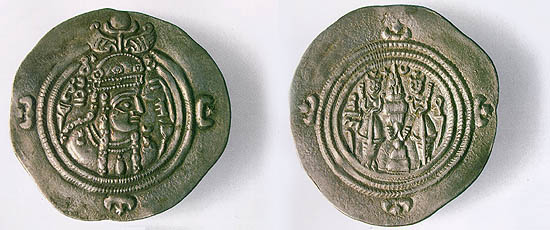
Queen Purandokht, the last woman on the throne of the Sassanid dynasty, 630.

- Mani the prophet: Founder of Manichaeism.
- Mazdak: Proto-socialist philosopher and founder of Mazdakism.
- Bozorgmehr: Physician and minister of Khosrau I.
- Purandokht (Boran): Sasanian queen.
- Barbod the Great: Court musician of the king Khosrau II who created the first musical system in the Middle East, known as the Royal Khosravani and dedicated to the king himself.
- Nagisa (Nakisa): The court musician who collaborated with Barbod on his famous septet piece the Royal Khosravani.
- Sarkash: Though not as renowned as Barbod or Nakisa, he was a remarkable musician.
- Rostam Farrokhzād: The last great general of Sassanids. While unsuccessful at repelling the Arab Muslim invaders, Iranian folklore and history consider him a hero.
- Salman the Persian: One of the Sahaba. He is among The Four Companions.
