= Mazdaznan =

Neo-Zoroastrian religion founded at the end of the 19th century

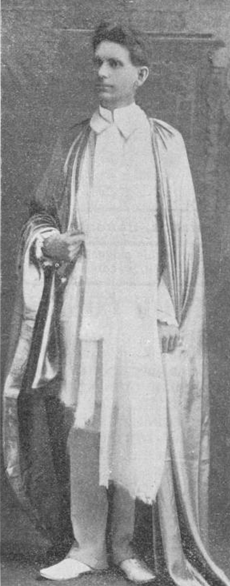
Otoman Zar-Adusht Ha'nish, founder of Mazdaznan

Mazdaznan is a neo-Zoroastrian new religious movement which held that the Earth should be restored to a garden where humanity can cooperate and converse with God. Founded at the end of the 19th century by Otoman Zar-Adusht Ha'nish, born Otto Haenisch, the religion was a revival of 6th century Mazdakism. Adherents maintained a vegetarian diet and practiced breathing exercises. Concerned with the nature of thought, emotion and behavior, Mazdaznan taught that the practical aspects of personal health could be achieved through conscious breathing, "Gah-Llama". The word Mazdaznan is said to derive from the Persian "Mazda" and "Znan", and is supposed to mean "master thought".

== Mazdaznan Philosophy ==
In 1902 the Rev. Dr. Zar-Adusht-Hanish promoted his philosophy and lessons in a monthly journal called Sun-Worshiper supported by health related advertisers in the Chicago area. In the February 1902 edition this "Mazdaznan Philosophy, and its Practicability to Every day Life" is listed.

- MAN has free agency and with such he must choose his own path of life. If this agency is conditional than where is his freedom?
- GOD can be real only to the individual in accordance to his own comprehension, and inasmuch as we are physically related to nature, we know of ourselves either good or evil.
- A WHEEL may be turned in two directions, forward or backwards. In either case it moves according to one common law. The cause of its moving is the same, but as to the outcome of its being moved remains for the effect to tell.
- LOVE is the expression of God permeating all space and throughout all time, which increases in power by constant emanation, exercising its influence undivided to the good and the evil, and differs in effect only to the degree of recognized relationship.
- A MAN possesses knowledge of God only when he has recognized the fact that all things are to be measured by a standard implying justice, and uses consideration in all his transactions with nature's productions, irrespective of presentation.
- MAZDA is the Master-Thought of the Sun-Worship Philosophy, from whence all existence evolves and the subsistence of things involves. It is the Center of Being comprising the Complex Whole in its Manifestation of Variation.
- "PEACE on earth" is a standing proclamation, but its application is dependent upon our recognition of the same. To have peace we must be free, but man has to live to discover it, and not die for it.
- OUR consciousness of things within the universe is measured by the application of Love and Wisdom, while our sense for liberty depends upon our ability in concentrating’ the control of our actions.
- THE two natures, or the dual sense, are represented in every living being, and the decision for the guidance by the one or the other, the good or the evil, depends upon our desire for selection, which makes itself manifest through our action.
- ALTHOUGH there is freedom, we still struggle for it. Were it not for the incentive toward freedom we could never realize its presence. In externalization we hope to attain it, through effort and struggle we expect to gain it, yet we shall not become conscious of it until we eam? that "the things we are striving for are ever near."
- ORDINARILY you will hear people boast of their freedom and their unlimited liberty to say and to act as they please, but after close examination you will always find that the greatest boasters enjoy the least freedom and liberty. It is the slave only who dreams of liberty. He is like unto a chained watch-dog, that would scare anyone with his loud barking, and to prove his authority of a dog he will jump about to his chain's end, only to be choking, but the moment you throw the fleshpots of Egypt at him, he will clinch his teeth into the meat and growl for fear you might take the bone away from him. Unchain him and he will run about as if on a wild goose chase and be anywheres und everyWheres but where his duty lies.
- ACCORDING to our way of thinking we direct our faith and the assurance of the same will bring its due reward to us, while a wavering towards the pursuance of the direct path will heap burdens upon our shoulders, the weight thereof bearing us down to sorrow and shame.
- EVERYTHING that suffers bondage, be it sickness, sorrow, sin or poverty, lacks the knowledge of God and is merely an outcome of forced conditions towards a collective presentation that has no understanding of law or order.
- THE wise and the ignorant alike strive towards the goal insuring freedom. The one expects to find it in the noumenon world, the other thinks to attain to it in the phenomenal world, One thinks that through renunciation freedom will come, the other holds, that by the accumulation of means he shall enjoy greater freedom. Both agree that in freedom lies their only assurance.
- EXPRESSIONS like good and evil, spiritual and material, higher and lower, are terms used to designate the dual sense of presentation in the phenomenal world in accordance to the position taken towards it. From the noumenon realm only all things are polarized into the knowledge of the complex whole, taking the stand, that "I have not come to judge, but when I do judge, my judgment is just."
- MANY paths lead to the mountain top. Some are more straight and shorter than others, some more winding and longer, others again more uncertain and full of hardship and difficult to climb, while others are more delightful to tread, some again thorny and wild. Still, they all start at the foot of the mountain, and it matters not how many, towards the top they all taper, and running into each other, become a common road.

== Teachings ==
Mazdaznan has been described as a "strange mixture of occult teachings, Zoroastrianism, Christianity and Lebensreform". Although the movement originally consisted of public lectures and group exercise, popular demand made a book called The Power of Breath (1958) available. Mazdaznan advocated a vegetarian diet with breathing, bowel and glandular exercises for physical, spiritual and mental development.

Its lack of lasting popularity can be attributed to the fact that besides emphasizing the importance of the individual decision, it proclaims personal responsibility for one's own fortune. Its success as a word of mouth movement that spawned similar groups can be attributed to its "tried and true" traditions of how different physical postures and ways of breathing produce predictable and controllable mental states.

Its relationship to Judeo-Christian and other religions can be deduced from its emphasis upon three historical characters: Ainyahita, Zarathustra and Jehoshua. Ainyahita, daughter of the divinely created couple (may be related to Anahita), lived 9000 years ago and is supposed to be the origin of the Aryan race, which includes the Jews and therefore Jesus of Nazareth. The traditional God character of most religions has its Mazdaznan component in "Gah-Llama" which is referred to as "intelligence," and "In the air you breathe."

The Power of Breath discusses Gah-Llama in 10 rhythmic conscious breathing exercises with illustrations, where the main goal is self-control and mastery of your body. It is in all respects, like yoga, a non-theistic tradition, in that all words for the unknown are recognized as linguistic and semantic peculiarities, with no rules except for suggestions for health, which are accompanied with a note that you know what's best for yourself.

== Movement ==
The first centres were established in the United States in the late 19th century. Since 1917, Hanisch settled mainly in Los Angeles. By 1937 there were 52 Mazdaznan centres.

In Europe, Mazdaznan was spread by the former Californian farmers David and Frieda Ammann beginning in about 1907. David Ammann was expelled from Leipzig, Germany in 1914 due to the publication of the book Inner Studies. The main centre for Mazdaznan in Europe was the Lebensschule at Herrliberg near Zürich. One of the most famous European followers of the movement was the abstract painter Johannes Itten, who taught at the Bauhaus, who insisted on shaven heads, crimson robes and colonic irrigation.

In the 1930s, Gloria Gasque, a wealthy follower of the movement, went to Bombay intending to restore the "true" message of Zoroaster to the Parsis. Though met with hostility, she remained there for a number of years before she returned to the United States.

== Controversies ==
=== Child abuse ===
Otoman Zar-Adusht Ha'nish and Mazdaznan teachers were accused of child abuse, pedophilic sexual abuse and rape which resulted in numerous lawsuits.

=== Racialism ===
Mazdaznan was originally not antisemitic as it taught that Jews were part of the "white race". Mazdaznan was banned by Nazi Germany in 1935. Mazdaznan taught the hierarchy of six biological human races with white Aryans at the top. Arabs and Zoroastrians were considered part of the Aryan race, whilst Indian Hindus were not.

The Mazdaznan movement became associated with antisemitic figures from the far right in the United States. C. Leon de Aryan the editor of the antisemitic magazine The Broom was a notable promoter of Mazdaznan during the 1930s and 1940s. Robert M. Price has stated that Mazdaznan was a "racist group, [as] it allowed that only true Aryans could be enlightened".

The Mazdaznan taught white supremacy and was opposed to miscegenation and race mixing between whites and blacks.

== Literature ==
- Hanish, Otoman Zar-Adusht: Inner Studies: A Course of Twelve Lessons, 1902
- Hanish, Otoman Zar-Adusht: Ainyahita in Pearls (articles 1907–1909)
- Hanish, Otoman Zar-Adusht: Mazdaznan Dietetics and Cookery Book, 1913
- Hanish, Otoman Zar-Adusht: Mazdaznan Health and Breath Culture, 1914
- Hanish, Otoman Zar-Adusht: Jehoshua the Nazir, (describes mystical eastern sources on Jesus of Nazareth).
- Hanish, Otoman Zar-Adusht: Ever Creative Thought, 1931

== See also ==
- List of Zoroastrianism sects
