= Marajil =

Umm walad of Harun al-Rashid and mother of Abbasid caliph Al-Ma'mun

Marajil مراجل

Umm walad of the Abbasid caliph
- Period: 786 – 14/15 September 786
- Born: Badghis, Abbasid Caliphate
- Died: c. 786; Baghdad, Abbasid Caliphate
- Burial: Baghdad
- Spouse: Harun al-Rashid
- Children: Al-Ma'mun
Names
- Umm Abdallah Marajil bint Ustadh Sis
- Father: Ustadh Sis

Marājil (Arabic: مراجل; d. 786) was an umm walad of caliph Harun al-Rashid and mother of caliph al-Ma'mun.

== Biography ==
Marajil was a Persian slave concubine of Abbasid prince Harun (future Caliph Harun al-Rashid). According to one account, she had entered the Abbasid household as a prisoner of war. Marajil was raised in the Abbasid household before being given as a concubine to prince Harun. She was one or two years younger than Harun.

Marajil's only child, Abdallah (the future al-Ma'mun), was born in Baghdad on the night of the 13 to 14 September 786 CE to Harun al-Rashid and his concubine Marajil, from Badghis. On the same night, which later became known as the "night of the three caliphs", his uncle Al-Hadi died and was succeeded by Ma'mun's father, Harun al-Rashid, as ruler of the Abbasid Caliphate. Harun became caliph in 786 when he was in his early twenties. At the time, he was tall, good looking, and slim but strongly built, with wavy hair and olive skin. Upon his accession, Harun led Friday prayers in Baghdad's Great Mosque and then sat publicly as officials and the layman alike lined up to swear allegiance and declare their happiness at his ascent to Amir al-Mu'minin. He began his reign by appointing very able ministers, who carried on the work of the government so well that they greatly improved the condition of the people. Marajil witnessed the accession of Harun and she received title Umm Abdallah from the Caliph. However, on the night of Harun's accession to the throne, in September 786 her health started deteriorating after birth of Abdallah.

Marajil died soon after his birth, and Abdallah was raised by Harun al-Rashid's wife, Zubayda, herself of high Abbasid lineage as the granddaughter of Caliph al-Mansur (r. 754–775). Marajil connection to Khurasan became her major contribution to Al-Ma'mun's career.

== See also ==
- Al-Abbas ibn al-Ma'mun

== Sources ==
- Rekaya, M. (1991). "al-Maʾmūn". In Bosworth, C. E.; van Donzel, E. & Pellat, Ch. (eds.). The Encyclopaedia of Islam, Second Edition. Volume VI: Mahk–Mid. Leiden: E. J. Brill. pp. 331–339. ISBN 978-90-04-08112-3.
- Bosworth, C. E., ed. (1989). The History of al-Ṭabarī, Volume XXX: The ʿAbbāsid Caliphate in Equilibrium: The Caliphates of Mūsā al-Hādī and Hārūn al-Rashīd, A.D. 785–809/A.H. 169–192. SUNY Series in Near Eastern Studies. Albany, New York: State University of New York Press. ISBN 978-0-88706-564-4.
- Abbott, Nabia (1946). Two Queens of Baghdad: Mother and Wife of Hārūn Al Rashīd. University of Chicago Press. ISBN 978-0-86356-031-6.
- Bobrick, Benson (2012). The Caliph's Splendor: Islam and the West in the Golden Age of Baghdad. Simon & Schuster. ISBN 978-1416567622.
