= Second Zoroaster =

5th-century Zoroastrian leader

The Second Zoroaster (Note: He may have been called Zaradust-e Khuragen (Persian: زرتشت خورگان)) is a title that refers to a mysterious precursor and possible direct teacher of the Iranian prophet Mazdak, the eponymous founder of Mazdakism.

Born in Fasa in the Sasanian Empire, he founded a heterodox and syncretic sect of Zoroastrianism called Dorostdini. Dorostdini was the root of Mazdakism, and the sect put emphasis on the use of wisdom instead of religious laws. For many years he lived in the Byzantine Empire.

But Al-Ya'qubi mentioned in his book, "Tarikh al-Yaqubi," that Zoroaster, son of Kharkan, and his followers were killed, just as Mazdak was.
