= Behafarid =

8th-century Persian Zoroastrian heresiarch

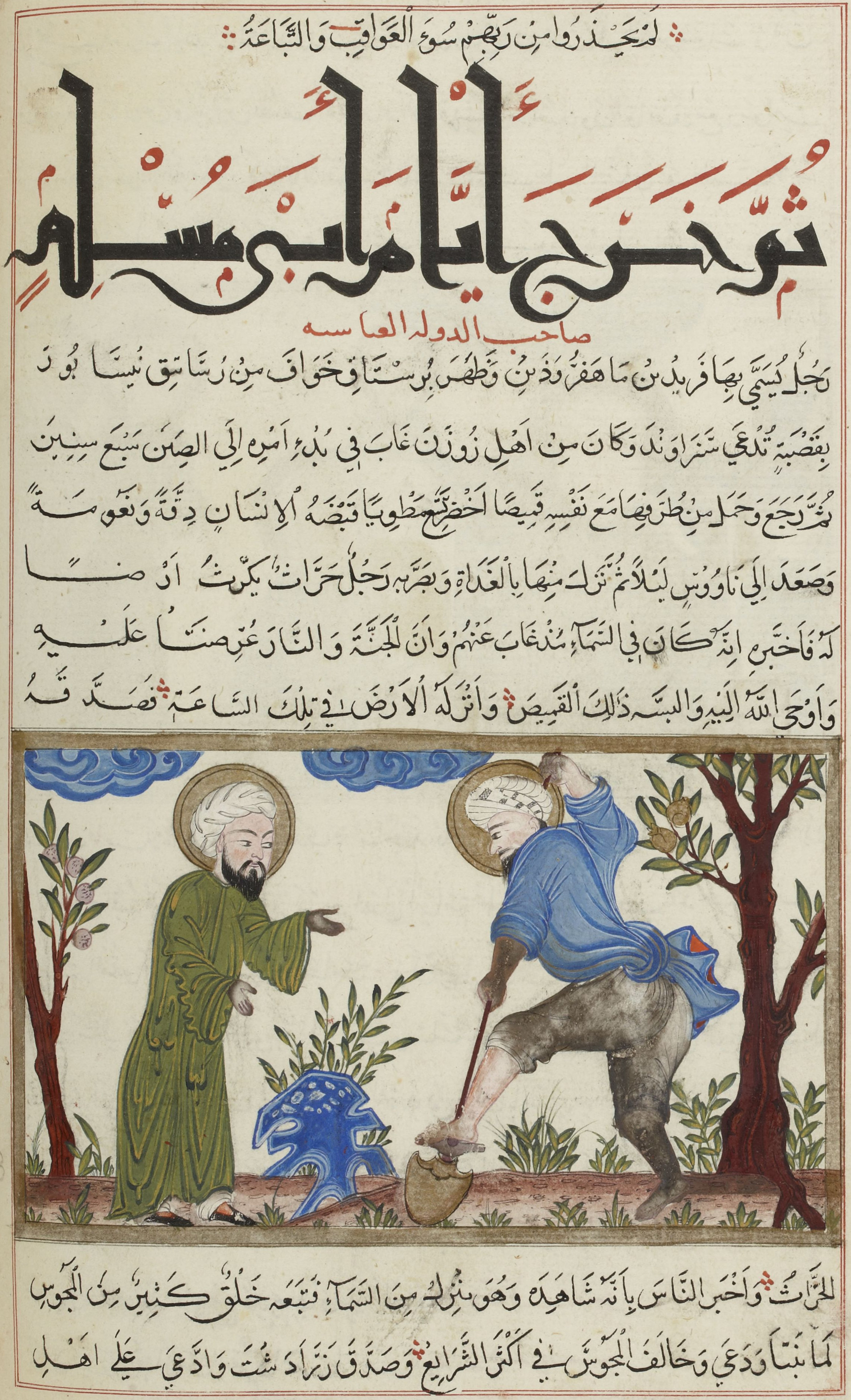

Behāfarīd or Beh-Āfarīd (Note: According to the modern Iranian Persian, as well as even the Afghan Persian and Tajik Persian transliteration standards; the following are the pronunciations: Iranian Persian pronunciation: [beɦ.ʔɒː.fæ.ɹíːd̪̥] Afghan Persian pronunciation: [be̞ɦ.ʔɑː.fä.ɾíːd̪] Tajik Persian pronunciation: [beɦ.ʔɔ.fä.ɾíd̪]) (Middle Persian: Weh-Āfrīd, New Persian: به‌آفرید, romanized: Bih-Āfarīd, also spelled Bihāfarīd or Bih-Āfarīd) (Note: According to the Early New Persian and Classical Persian transliteration standards; pronounced as: [bih.ʔaː.fa.ˈriːd].) was an 8th-century Persian Zoroastrian heresiarch who started a religious peasant revolt with elements from Zoroastrianism and Islam (Behafaridians). He believed in Zoroaster and upheld all Zoroastrian institutions. His followers prayed seven times a day facing the Sun, prohibited intoxicants, and kept their hair long and disallowed sacrifices of cattle except when they were decrepit. His revolt was quelled by the Abbasid general Abu Muslim, and he was executed by hanging. His followers, however, believed that he would descend again. Some of his followers joined the Ustadh Sis movement.

== See also ==
- Religious influences on Zoroastrianism
- Ustadh Sis
- Ishaq al-Turk
- Sunpadh
- al-Muqanna

== Sources ==
- Crone, Patricia (2012). The Nativist Prophets of Early Islamic Iran: Rural Revolt and Local Zoroastrianism. Cambridge University Press. pp. 1–543. ISBN 9781139510769.
