= The Veiled Prophet (opera) =

1877 opera by Charles Villiers Stanford and William Barclay Squire

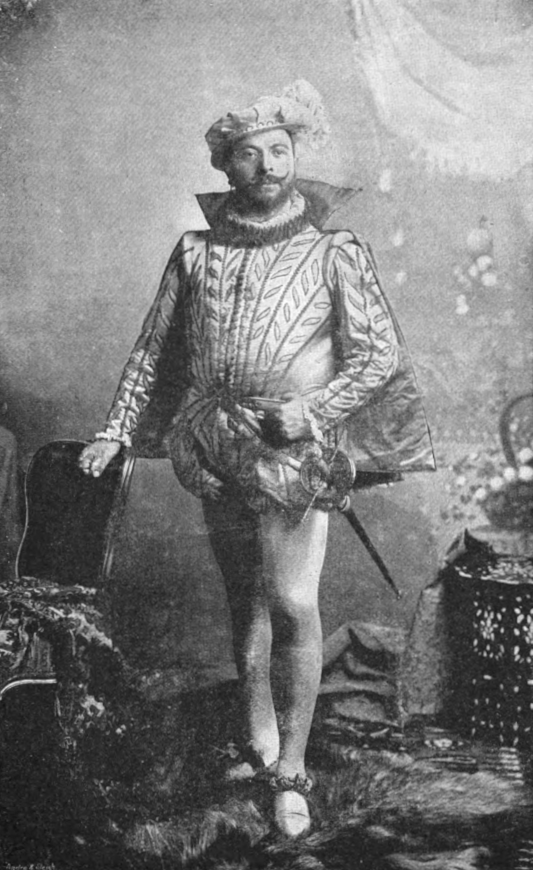
Mario Ancona as Mokanna at the Royal Opera House in 1893

The Veiled Prophet is an 1877 romantic opera in three acts by Charles Villiers Stanford to a libretto by William Barclay Squire based on the 1817 poem "The Veiled Prophet of Khorassan" (Lalla Rookh) by Thomas Moore. It was first performed in Hanover in 1881, in German. Its sole British performance was given in Italian at the Royal Opera House, London, in 1893, and its first performance in its original English version was at the Wexford Festival in 2019.

The opera depicts the tyranny of Mokanna, the hideously disfigured veiled prophet, and his overthrow by the young warrior Azim. Unlike the source poem, the opera ends happily with Azim and his love Zelika united.

== Background and premieres ==
The libretto is based on Moore's poem "The Veiled Prophet of Khorassan", but the original story is not adhered to in every detail, particularly at the denouement: in the opera the heroine, Zelika, is restored to her lover Azim, instead of being killed by him in mistake for the false prophet. The subject of the opera was suggested to Stanford in or about 1875 by his Dublin friend Raoul Couturier de Versan, but it was not until 1877 that the composer asked William Barclay Squire to adapt the poem for a libretto. Stanford's biographer Jeremy Dibble writes of the poem:

Not only was Moore's literary creation an epic one, with widespread appeal, but it vividly suggested possibilities of dance, chorus, and grand statement that could intermingle with those elements of exoticism and colour as well as those other essential polemic emotional features of traditional dramaturgy, good and evil, love, death, passion, and revenge.

Stanford was a fluent and prolific composer, and work on the score proceeded quickly, although interrupted by his marriage and honeymoon in April 1878. There being little appetite among British impresarios for staging British operas, Stanford attempted to interest several German opera houses in the work, and after initial refusals it was accepted by the Hoftheater in Hanover. It was given as Der verschleierte Prophet in a German translation made by the conductor Ernst Frank, Kapellmeister of the Hanover opera. (Note: Ernst Frank (1846–1889), formerly musical director at Mannheim and then Frankfurt, succeeded Hans von Bülow at Hanover in 1880. Stanford regarded Frank as "one of the most enlightened and large-hearted musicians of our time".) The local press, engaged in a feud with the management of the opera house, gave the piece poor reviews, but the wider German press was more favourable. A vocal score with piano accompaniment by an uncredited arranger and containing Squire's English and Frank's German words was published in 1881 by Boosey in London and Bote and Bock in Berlin. Stanford gave opus numbers to most of his nine operas, but The Veiled Prophet is one of the three without one. (Note: The others are The Canterbury Pilgrims and Savonarola.)

For the single British performance, at the Royal Opera House, Covent Garden, on 26 July 1893, Stanford revised the score, replacing the original, fairly conventional overture with a shorter introduction, and introducing a new song for Zelika in the second act. In accordance with the prevailing custom at Covent Garden the work was given in Italian as Il profeta velato, in a translation by Giannandrea Mazzucato. Dibble comments that having the opera sung in Italian was ridiculous (the practice was dropped before the next production of one of Stanford's operas at Covent Garden, Much Ado About Nothing, in 1901) but the work was well received by the audience and the critics. A vocal score of the revised edition was published by Boosey in 1893, with English and Italian texts.

The premiere of the opera with its original English text was at the Wexford Festival in a concert performance in 2019. Reviewing the performance in The Daily Telegraph, Rupert Christiansen wrote, "The Veiled Prophet may be a technically clumsy and naively bombastic affair in the vein of Meyerbeer, but it has heartfelt melodies and youthful ambition that merit an airing."

== Roles and first casts ==
Role	Voice type	Hanover, 1881 cond. Ernst Frank	London, 1893 cond. Luigi Mancinelli	Wexford, 2019 cond. David Brophy
The Caliph Mahadi	bass	– von Milde	– Vaschetti	Thomas Hopkinson
Mokanna, the veiled prophet	baritone	– Nollet	Mario Ancona	Simon Mechliński
Zelika, priestess	soprano	– Börs	Lillian Nordica	Sinéad Campbell-Wallace
Fatima, chief slave in the harem	soprano	– Vizthum-Pauli	Lucille Hill	Mairead Buicke
Azim, a young warrior	tenor	– Schott	– Vignas	Gavan Ring
Abdullah, Mokanna's slave	bass	– Bletzacher	– Villani	John Molloy
A young watchman	tenor	– Emge	– Guetary	Dominick Felix

Sources: The Musical Times (Hanover); The Manchester Guardian (London); and Wexford Opera.

== Synopsis ==
The scene is the prophet Mokanna's palace in Merow (Persia). It opens with choruses expressing homage to the prophet. The young soldier Azim is appointed to lead Mokanna's troops against the advancing Caliph. Zelica, watching through a latticed window, sees the departure of the warriors, with her beloved Azim at their head, and implores Mokanna to give her back her lover. In a lengthy duet Zelica's dream of happiness is dispelled and the tyrant prophet forces her to swear to win Azim to his cause for ever. Eventually the prophet raises his veil and discloses his terrible features to Zelica:

Here, judge if Hell with all its power to damn,
Can add one curse to the foul thing I am.

In the second act Azim is introduced into the harem, and there follows a long scene comprising choruses for the women, an air for Fatima, "There's a bower of roses" and a ballet. Zelica enters. Azim's ardent passion overcomes her, and, forgetting her oath, she agrees to flee with him. At the close of their love duet Mokanna appears; Azim tries to stab him but his weapon breaks in two, and he rushes out vowing vengeance.

The last act takes place outside the palace. It opens with an air for the watchman, followed by a conspirators' chorus which Mokanna boldly interrupts, and to impress his wavering followers he performs a miracle before their eyes—the moon rising apparently at his bidding. He then sends them into the palace to their deaths: he has had their wine poisoned. After the ensemble there are a duet for Zelica and Fatima, a solo for Zelica (written for the London production), and a duet for Zelica and Mokanna, at the end of which Azim bursts in with the Caliph's soldiers. Mokanna is quickly overcome, but he escapes from the guards, and with a parting shout of defiance he throws himself into a pool. The opera concludes with a chorus of triumph.

== Numbers ==
=== Act 1 ===
- Overture
- From the midday's burning heat (Chorus)
- Would ye gain the glorious guerdon? (Mokanna)
- On to vict'ry (Zelika)

=== Act 2 ===
- Twine the wreath and bind the flower (Chorus of women)
- Be your care to steep his soul (Fatima)
- The prophet, our master (Abdullah)
- In vain, no trace is found (Azim)
- Spirit of love (Chorus of women)
- First ballet
- There's a bower of roses (Fatima)
- Second ballet

=== Act 3 ===
- When I left thee (Watchman)
- So to your doom (Mokanna)
- This night will Azim (Zelika and Fatima)
- Oh peaceful mother (Zelika)
- Finale

Source: Vocal score.

== Notes, references and sources ==
=== Sources ===
- Dibble, Jeremy (2002). Charles Villiers Stanford: Man and Musician. Oxford: Oxford University Press. ISBN 978-0-19-816383-1.
- Porte, John (1921). Sir Charles V. Stanford, Mus. Doc., M.A., D.C.L. London and New York: Kegan Paul and Dutton. OCLC 2534852.
- Stanford, Charles Villiers (1881). The Veiled Prophet: Vocal Score. London: Boosey. OCLC 21830092.
- Stanford, Charles Villiers (1908). Studies and Memories. London: Constable. OCLC 855469.|
