= Al-Muqanna =

Muslim leader from Balkh, Afghanistan (died c. 783)

Al-Muqanna (Arabic: المقنع, lit. 'The Veiled', died c. 783), born Hashim (Arabic: هاشم), was an 8th-century political and military leader who operated in modern Iran. He led a rebellion against the Abbasid Caliphate and according to various Muslim historians, claimed to be a prophet. He was a major figure of the Khurramite religious movement, which drew on both Zoroastrian and Islamic influences.

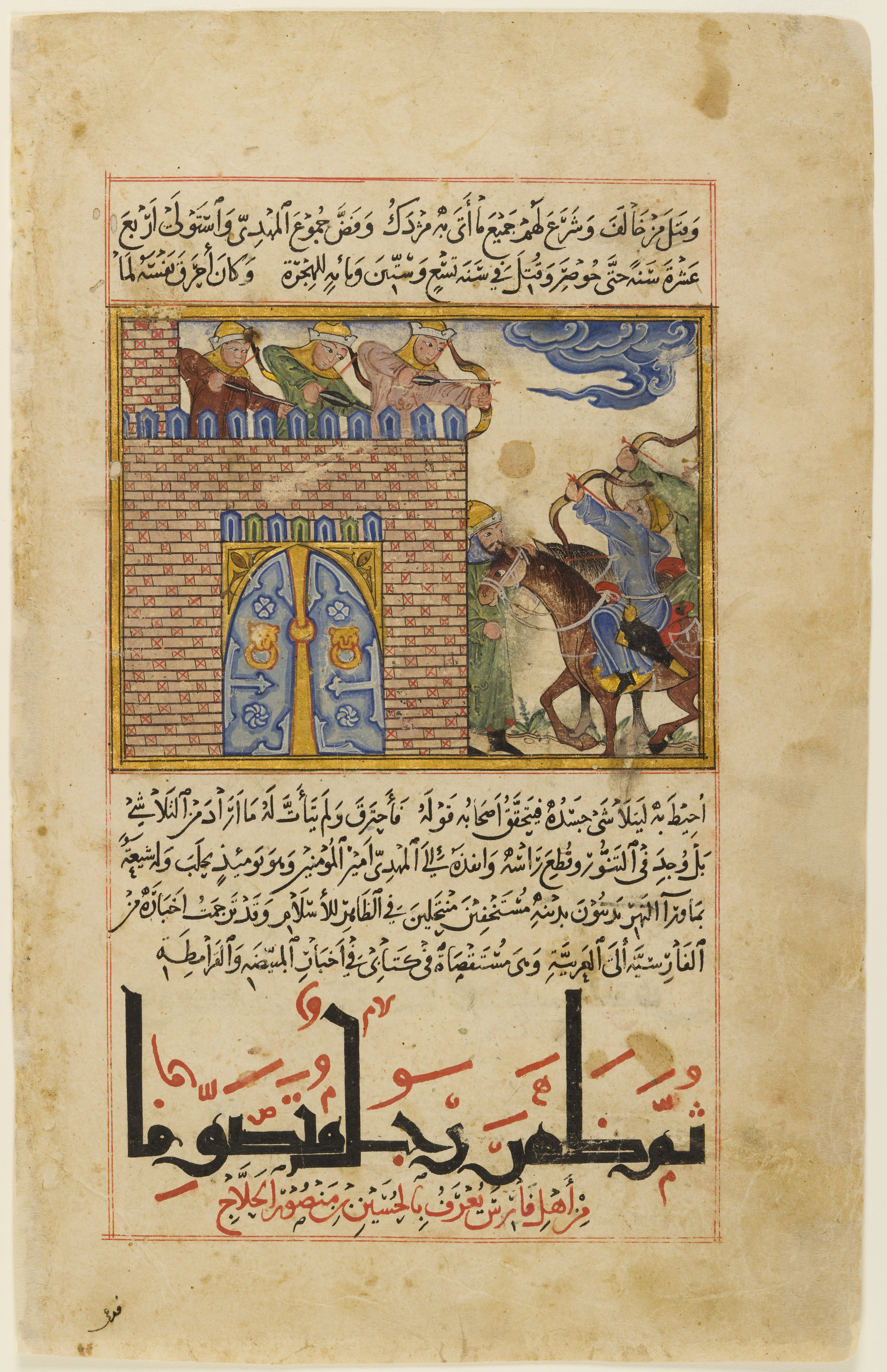
An illustration from the Chronology of Ancient Nations depicting the siege of Al-Muqanna's fortress

Iranian academics Said Nafisi and Amir-Hossein Aryanpour wrote about him in the context of the Khorrām-Dīnān, the religious movement he founded around AD 755.

== Name and early life ==
Al-Muqanna was born with the name Hashim. He was a native of Balkh in modern Afghanistan. At the time, the city was under the rule of the Abbasid Caliphate, whose heads claimed successorship to the Islamic prophet Muhammad, and leadership of the Muslim community. Hashim worked in textiles before his political and religious career. Al-Muqanna's nickname comes from the veil he wore over his face.

Modern scholars have offered differing views on his origin. Bernard Lewis described al-Muqanna' as a Persian heretic, while Philip K. Hitti considered him "probably a Persian, not a Kindite". Richard Foltz, however, describes him as being of Sogdian or Bactrian origin. Patricia Crone in Encyclopædia Iranica states that he was said to have come from Balkh rather than Sogdia.

== Career ==
Of Iranian stock, Hashim was from Balkh, and he was a clothes pleater. He became a commander for Abu Muslim who ruled over the province of Greater Khorasan under the Abbasid caliphs. After Abu Muslim's execution in 755 AD on the orders of the second Abbasid caliph al-Mansur, Hashim was said to have claimed to be the either an incarnation of God or a prophet.

He was reputed to wear a veil in order to cover up his beauty, which possibly inspired Musa al-Mubarqa', while his followers wore white clothes in opposition to Abbasid rulers' black. He is reputed to have engaged in magic and miracles in order to gain followers. According to Bertold Spuler, Muslim historians portray Muqanna and his followers as having introduced common ownership of women.

Hashim was instrumental in the formation of the Khorrām-Dīnān armies which were led by Pāpak Khorram-Din. This was an uprising of Iranians aimed at overthrowing the ruling Abbasids.

When Hashim’s followers began raiding towns and property of other Muslims, looting their possessions, the Abbasid caliph sent several commanders to crush the rebellion. Hashim chose to poison himself rather than surrender to the Abbasids, who had set fire to his house. Hashim died in a Persian fort near Kesh. The Khorrām-Dīnān armies continued to exist until the 12th century.

== Cultural references ==
In 1787 Napoleon Bonaparte wrote a two-page short story about al-Muqanna called "Le Masque prophète".

The first poem in Lalla-Rookh (1817) by Thomas Moore is titled The Veiled Prophet of Khorassan, and the character Mokanna is modeled loosely on al-Muqanna‘. An 1877 opera, The Veiled Prophet by Charles Villiers Stanford, is in turn loosely based on the story of Mokanna as given in Lalla-Rookh.

St. Louis businessmen referenced Moore's poem in 1878 when they created the Veiled Prophet Organization and concocted a legend of Mokanna as its founder. For many years the organization put on an annual fair and parade called the "Veiled Prophet Fair", which was renamed Fair Saint Louis in 1992. The organization also gave a debutante ball each December called the Veiled Prophet Ball.

The Mystic Order of Veiled Prophets of the Enchanted Realm (founded 1889), often known as "the Grotto", a social group with membership restricted to Master Masons, and its female auxiliary, the Daughters of Mokanna (founded 1919), also take their names from Thomas Moore's poem.

Argentine writer Jorge Luis Borges used a fictionalized al-Muqanna‘ as the central character of The Masked Dyer, Hakim of Merv, a 1934 short story, and in another story fifteen years later, The Zahir, as a past avatar of the titular object.

Sax Rohmer used the legend of el Mokanna as the background for his 1934 novel, The Mask of Fu Manchu.

Le Prophète Voilé (The Veiled Prophet) is a play by the Moroccan writer Abdelkebir Khatibi reinterpreting the story of Al-Muqanna from historical and fictional accounts. The play was first published in 1979 in France.

Iranian film director Khosrow Sinai has a film script about al-Muqanna entitled Sepidjāmeh (The Man in White) published in Tehran in 1999.

== See also ==
- Bihafarid
- Ustadh Sis
- Mazdak
- Khurramites
- Sunpadh
- Ishaq al-Turk
- Babak Khorramdin
- Afshin
- Maziar
- Al-Mubarqa
- M.O.V.P.E.R.
- Veiled Prophet Ball

== Sources ==
- M. S. Asimov, C. E. Bosworth u.a.: History of Civilizations of Central Asia. Band IV: The Age of Achievement. AD 750 to the End of the Fifteenth Century. Part One: The Historical, Social and Economic Setting. Paris 1998.
- Patricia Crone: The Nativist Prophets of Early Islamic Iran. Rural Revolt and Local Zoroastrianism. Cambridge: Cambridge University Press 2012. S. 106-143.
- Frantz Grenet: "Contribution à l'étude de la révolte de Muqanna' (c. 775-780): traces matérielles, traces hérésiographiques" in Mohammad Ali Amir-Moezzi (ed.): Islam: identité et altérité; hommage à Guy Monnot. Turnhout: Brepols 2013. S. 247-261.
- Boris Kochnev: "Les monnaies de Muqanna" in Studia Iranica 30 (2001) 143-50.
- Wilferd Madelung, Paul Ernest Walker: An Ismaili heresiography. The "Bāb al-shayṭān" from Abū Tammām’s Kitāb al-shajara. Brill, 1998.
- Svatopluk Soucek: A history of inner Asia. Cambridge University Press, 2000.
- Lewis, Bernard (2002). Arabs in History. Oxford: Oxford University Press. ISBN 9780191647161.
