= Otoman Zar-Adusht Ha'nish =

German religious movement founder

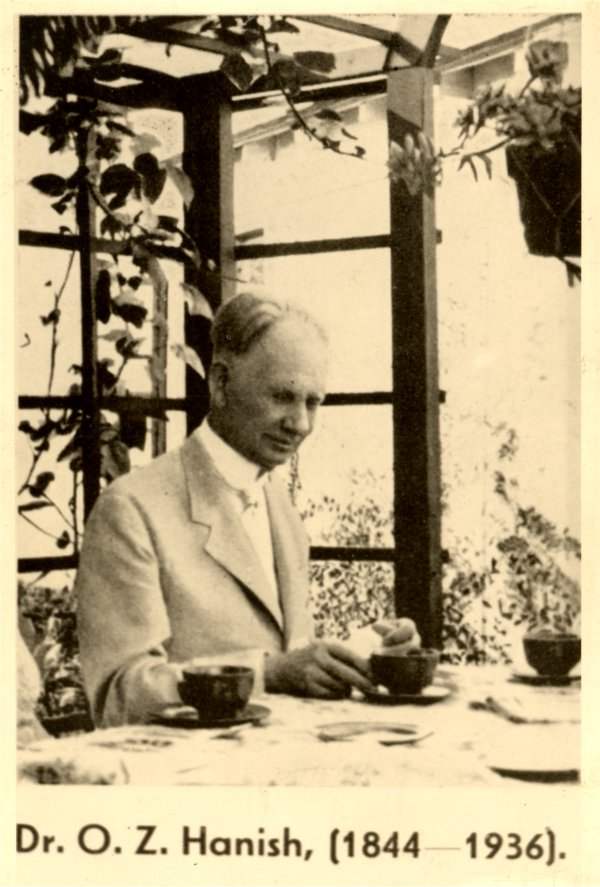

Otoman Zar-Adusht Ha'nish (December 19, 1856 – February 29, 1936) was the founder of a new religious movement known as Mazdaznan. He was born Ernst Otto Haenisch, a German immigrant from Poznań (then Posen), son of the grocer (victualer) Heinrich Ernst Haenisch and his wife Anna Dorothea nee Schmidt. He was baptized on December 28, 1856.

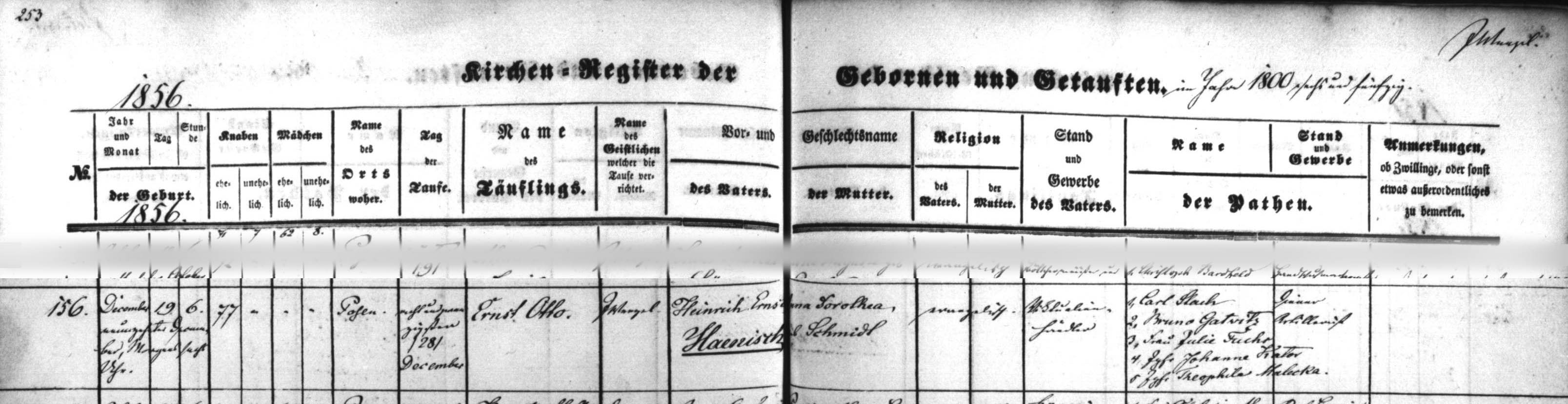
Otto Haenish, baptization record

He adopted the name Otoman Zar-Adusht Ha'nish in 1902, and his European follower David Ammann claimed that he was born in 1844 to a Russian diplomat in Tehran and to have been sent as a child to a secret society of Zoroastrians in the mountains of Iran due to his serious congenital heart defect, where he was trained to master his hypoxic condition with control of breathing.

== Life ==
According to Upton Sinclair, Hanisch lived in Mendota, Illinois, and his career included such varied pursuits as sheep herding, typesetting, mesmerism, and spiritualism. He is also reported to have joined the LDS Church, the Christian Catholic Apostolic Church and to have been a member of James Brighouse's Mormon splinter movement.

From 1900 Hanisch lived in Chicago. In 1908 Hanisch and his follower David Ammann published a magazine entitled Mazdaznan in Germany, which dealt with philosophy, physical education and dietary practices. Following the publication of the magazine Hanisch adopted the name Otoman (Zar-Adusht) Ha'nish. From 1908 he was resident in Los Angeles giving free public lectures on Sunday mornings.

Hanisch published several books including Health and Breath Culture and Inner Studies. He was a vegetarian for spiritual reasons. In 1914, he authored a vegetarian cookbook Mazdaznan Dietetics and Cookery Book.

Hanisch was an advocate of the swoon hypothesis. He taught that Jesus survived the Crucifixion and was restored using healing methods known to his followers.

== Controversy ==
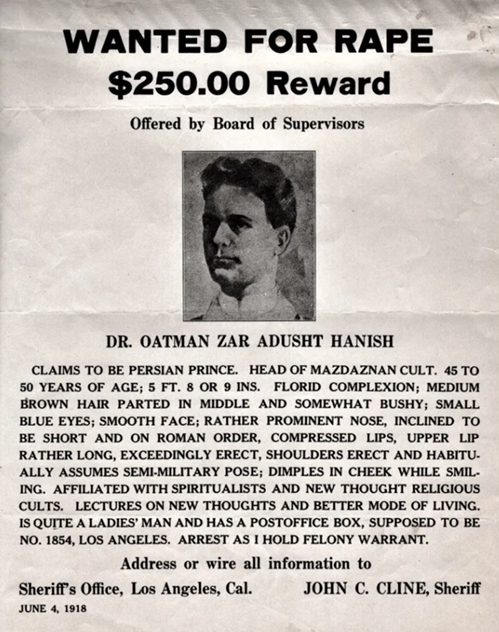
Otoman Zar-Adusht Ha'nish wanted poster, 1918

=== Billy Lindsay case ===
For many years Hanisch maintained a temple at 3016 Lake Park Avenue, Chicago. He first achieved notoriety in January 1912 through the so-called Billy Lindsay case. Billy's mother Elizabeth had become a member of Hanisch's movement and had sent Billy to travel across the country with Ha'nish. The boy's relatives became worried about the boy's welfare and after a coast-to-coast search Billy was discovered living in the Lake Park temple. His uncle filed a dependent petition on Billy's behalf and he was taken into custody, but he and his mother fled before the hearing.

During the juvenile court hearing on the petition, the uncle's attorney sought to prove that Billy had been neglected by his mother and also tried to prove that the whole Mazdaznan movement was immoral. As evidence, he had a chapter on marital relations from Hanisch's Inner Studies, in which pure tantric sexual intercourse was described, read into the record. According to the Chicago Daily News, the reading caused a number of women to leave the courtroom and even Hanisch himself blushed at hearing his own words.

The judge concluded the hearing by issuing a judicial decree which declared that Billy was a "neglected and dependent child, having no guardian of his person other than his mother", who because of her "religious fanaticism" was unfit to raise him. Additionally, it declared that Ha'nish was "not a proper person to have control of said child". The decree appointed the boy's uncles as his new guardians and authorized them to take him into their custody when he could be found. Elizabeth Lindsay was found to be in contempt of court for fleeing; this prevented her from obtaining a writ of error, since to do so she would have to bring Billy back, when she would lose custody of him. However, it turned out that Hanisch could sue for a writ of error since he had appeared in the proceedings, even though he had sworn that he had never had any custody or control of Billy.

=== 1912 arrest ===
The Lindsay case prompted an investigation of the movement, and after Hanisch sent an alleged obscene book by express to another state, the temple was raided on March 4, 1912, and he was arrested. He was convicted of sending obscene literature in interstate commerce, fined $2,500 and sentenced to six months' imprisonment. The "literature" in question was his book Inner Studies which was reported at the time to be sold for anything from $10 to $50 depending upon the resources of the purchaser.

=== 1920 charges ===
Hanisch was accused of pedophilic sexual abuse. In early 1920, Hanisch was arrested in Chicago, and sent to Los Angeles to answer criminal charges, a grand jury having voted ten indictments against him on June 14, 1918, after hearing charges. Several of the complainants were children ranging in age from 11 to 15 years old. The Los Angeles police mistakenly claimed that Hanisch's real name was Otto Zachariah Hanisch, that he was a Russian, and that his father was a Milwaukee music teacher named Richard Hanisch. They also said he had been lecturing under the name of Dr. Ken Wilson.

=== 1930 ===
On February 25, 1930, Hanisch was cited in a divorce suit by Herman R. Huber, a draftsman, who in his suit said that his wife had become "fanatical, idiotical, and unreasonable by following the repugnant rituals of moaning, raving and silly actions of the cult." He added that the power that the "master mind" held over women made them think more of his teachings than they did of their homes and families. Hanisch, 74 at the time, was described in the suit as "Ottoman, czar of Adusht, master mind Hanisch of the Mazdazans," and gave the address of his temple as 1159 South Norton Avenue, Los Angeles.

== Death ==
Hanisch died from pneumonia in Los Angeles on February 29, 1936.

== Selected publications ==
- Mazdaznan Dietetics and Cookery Book. The Mazdaznan Publishing Supply Co. 1914.
- The Power of Breath. Mazdaznan Press. 1958.
