= Behafaridians =

Behāfarīdians (Note: According to the modern Iranian Persian, as well as even the Afghan Persian and Tajik Persian transliteration standards; the following are the pronunciations: Iranian Persian pronunciation: [beɦ.ʔɒː.fæ.ɹíːd̪̥i.jé] Afghan Persian pronunciation: [be̞ɦ.ʔɑː.fä.ɾíːd̪i.já] Tajik Persian pronunciation: [beɦ.ʔɔ.fä.ɾíd̪i.já]) or Bihāfarīdians (Note: According to the Early New Persian and Classical Persian transliteration standards; pronounced as: [bih.ʔaː.fa.ˈriːdij.ˈja].) (New Persian: به‌آفریدیه, romanized: Bih-Āfarīdiyya) were followers of Behafarid, who led a religious peasant revolt incorporating elements of Zoroastrianism and Islam. Behafarid affirmed his belief in Zoroaster and maintained Zoroastrian institutions. His followers prayed seven times a day facing the Sun, forbade intoxicants, kept their hair long, and only permitted the sacrifice of decrepit cattle.

== Beliefs and History ==
The prayers, whose times were not specified, were devoted to: affirmation and worship of the one god, the creation of the heavens and the earth, the creation of animals and their sustenance, death, resurrection and the day of judgment, the inhabitants of heaven and hell and their fates and extolling the inhabitants of paradise. Al-Khwarizmi noted that Behafarid differed with Zoroastrianism on many religious tenets, and many Zoroastrians embraced his doctrine.

The Sasanians were followers of Ustadh Sis. This sect was reportedly very similar to the Behafaridians, with some sources suggesting little difference between them, though Ustadh Sis claimed prophethood for himself.

The sect continued to exist, as Al-Mutahhar ibn Tahir al-Maqdisi mentions that he met with a member of the sect. Ibn al-Nadim mentioned in his book al-Fihrist that there was a group of them living in Khorasan, but he also mentions that they used to pray five times in one day, he may indicate that some followers of a sect have made it five prayers.

In the book Hudud al-'Alam, the Bahafridis are mentioned, and it is stated that they live in one of the cities
