= Abu Muslim =

8th-century Persian revolutionary

- ابو مسلم
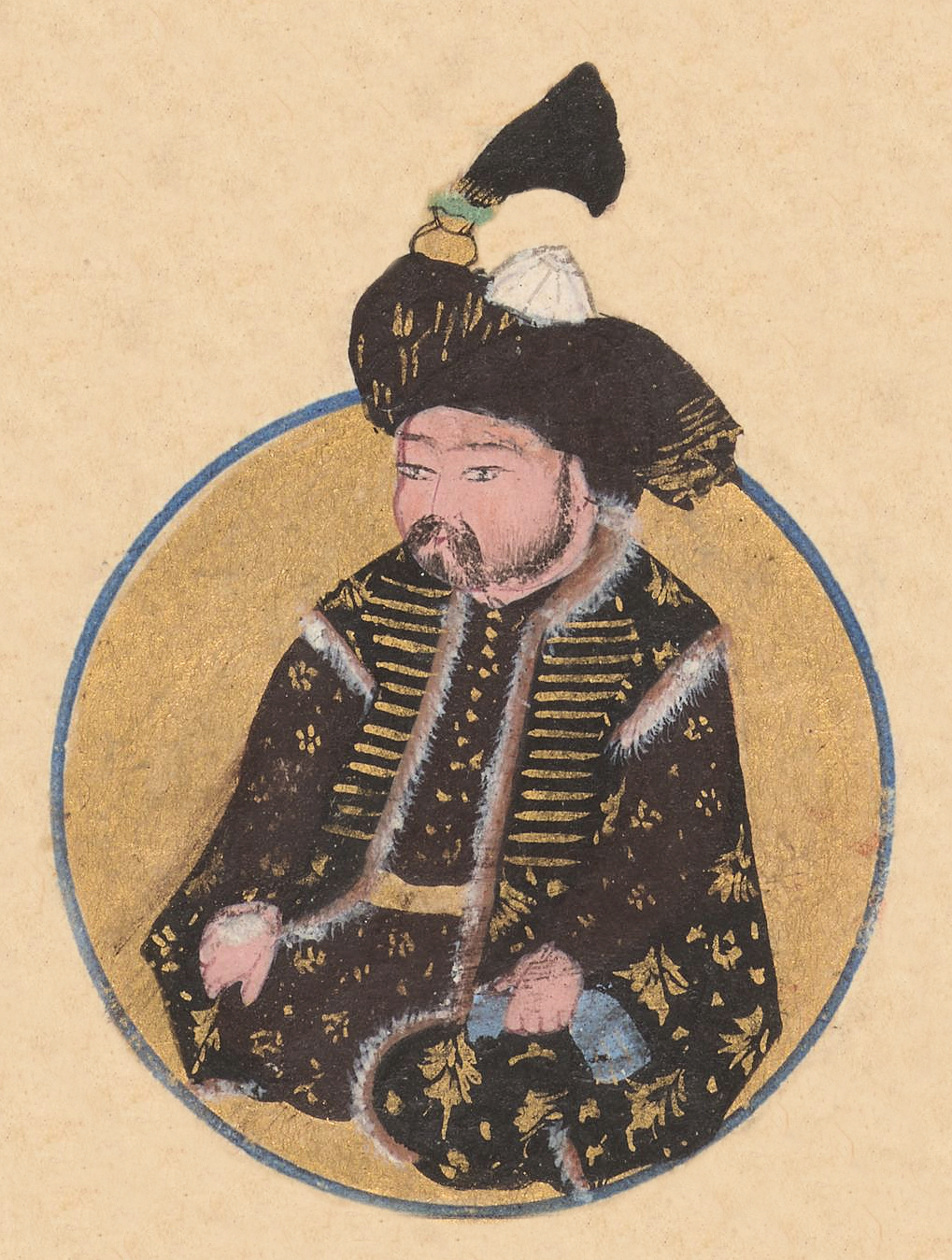
- Portrait of Abu Muslim (d. 755) from the genealogy (silsilanāma) "Cream of Histories" (Zübdet-üt Tevarih, 1598)

Personal details
- Born: c. 718 to 727 AD Either Merv or near Isfahan, Umayyad Caliphate
- Died: 755 AD (aged 28 – 37) Ctesiphon, Abbasid Caliphate
- Cause of death: Assassination
- Resting place: Body mutilated and thrown into Tigris River
- Occupation: Revolutionary; Missionary; General
- Known for: Leading the successful Abbasid Revolution

Military service
- Allegiance: Abbasid dynasty
- Years of service: 741–755 AD
- Battles/wars: Abbasid Revolution; Battle of the Zab; Abbasid–Chinese Wars; Battle of Talas

Abu Muslim (Note: His full nom de guerre as conferred by the Abbasid imam, in addition to the kunya Abu Muslim, is reported variously in the sources. Proposed forms include Abu Muslim ʿAbd al-Raḥmān ibn Muslim al-Khurasani (Arabic: أبو مسلم عبد الرحمن بن مسلم الخراساني; Persian: ابومسلم عبدالرحمان بن مسلم خراسانی).) (c. 718 to 727 – 755 CE) was a Persian revolutionary and military commander who was a central figure in the Abbasid Revolution that brought down the Umayyad Caliphate and established the Abbasid Caliphate.

Enslaved in Kufa during his youth, he came under the influence of Shi'ite activists associated with the Abbasid family when they secured his release and introduced him to anti-Umayyad doctrines. Recognized for his abilities and loyalty, he was tasked with leading Abbasid revolutionary activities in Khorasan and conferred the nom de guerre Abu Muslim.

In 747, Abu Muslim initiated the open phase of the Abbasid revolt, rapidly seizing Merv and rallying broad support among the populations of Khorasan. He subsequently directed the Abbasid advance across the Iranian plateau and into the Levant, culminating in the collapse of Umayyad authority and the proclamation of the Abbasid Caliphate. Thereafter he served as governor of Khorasan and emerged as one of the most powerful figures of the early Abbasid state.

Abu Muslim’s growing prominence provoked concern within the Abbasid leadership. While the first caliph refrained from acting against him, the second caliph, al-Mansur, ordered his execution in 755, alleging — likely without basis — that he harbored crypto-Zoroastrian sympathies. His death provoked unrest across Greater Iran, where he was subsequently venerated as a quasi-religious figure and martyr for centuries.

== Origin and name ==
According to Gholam-Hosayn Yusofi, "sources differ regarding his original name and his origin. Some make him a descendant of Gōdarz and of the vizier Bozorgmehr and call him Ebrāhīm; some name him Behzādān, son of Vendād Hormoz; and others relate him to the Abbasids or to the Alids. These suggestions are all doubtful". He was most likely of Persian origin, and was born in either Merv or near Isfahan. The exact date is unknown, either in 718/9 or sometime in 723/7.

== Shi'a activist and missionary activity in Khurasan ==
He grew up in Kufa, where he served as a slave and saddler of the Banu Ijl clan. It was there that Abu Muslim came into contact with Shi'a Muslims.

Kufa at the time was a hotbed of social and political unrest against the ruling Umayyad dynasty, whose policies favoured Arabs over non-Arab converts to Islam (mawālī) and were thus perceived to violate the Islamic promises of equality. The luxurious lifestyles of the Umayyad caliphs and their persecution of the Alids further alienated the pious. This rallied support for the Shi'a cause of rule by a member of the family of Muhammad, who would, as a God-guided imām or mahdī, rule according to the Quran and the Sunnah and create a truly Islamic government that would bring justice and peace to the Muslim community.

In 737, he was accused of associating with ghulat ("extremist, heterodox") sectarians. These activities landed him in prison, from where he was liberated in 741/2 by the leading Abbasid missionaries (naqāb, sing. naqīb) on their way to Mecca. He was introduced to the head of the Abbasid clan, Muhammad ibn Ali ibn Abdallah, who in 745/6 sent him to direct the missionary effort in Khurasan.

Khurasan, and the Iranian eastern half of the Caliphate in general, offered fertile ground for the Abbasids' missionary activities. Far from the Umayyad metropolitan province of Syria, Khurasan had a distinct identity. It was home to a large Arab settler community, which in turn had resulted in a large number of native converts, as well as intermarriage between Arabs and Iranians. As a frontier province exposed to constant warfare, the local Muslims were militarily experienced, and the common struggle had helped further unify the Arab and native Muslims of Khurasan, with a common dislike towards the centralizing tendencies of Damascus and the exactions of the Syrian governors. According to later accounts, already in 718/9 the Abbasids had dispatched twelve naqāb into the province, but modern scholars are sceptical of such claims, and it appears that only after the failure of the Revolt of Zayd ibn Ali in 740 did the Abbasid missionary movement begin to make headway in Khurasan. In 745, the Khurasani Qahtaba ibn Shabib al-Ta'i travelled west to swear allegiance to Ibrahim ibn Muhammad, and it was with him that Abu Muslim was sent east to assume control.

When Abu Muslim arrived in Khurasan, the province was in turmoil due to the impact of the ongoing Umayyad civil war of the Third Fitna, which had re-ignited the feud between the Yaman and Qays tribal groups: the numerous Yamani element in the province opposed the longtime governor, Nasr ibn Sayyar, and sought to replace him with their champion, Juday al-Kirmani. Al-Kirmani led an uprising against Ibn Sayyar, and drove him from the provincial capital, Merv, in late 746, with the governor fleeing to the Qaysi stronghold of Nishapur.

== Role in the Abbasid Revolution ==
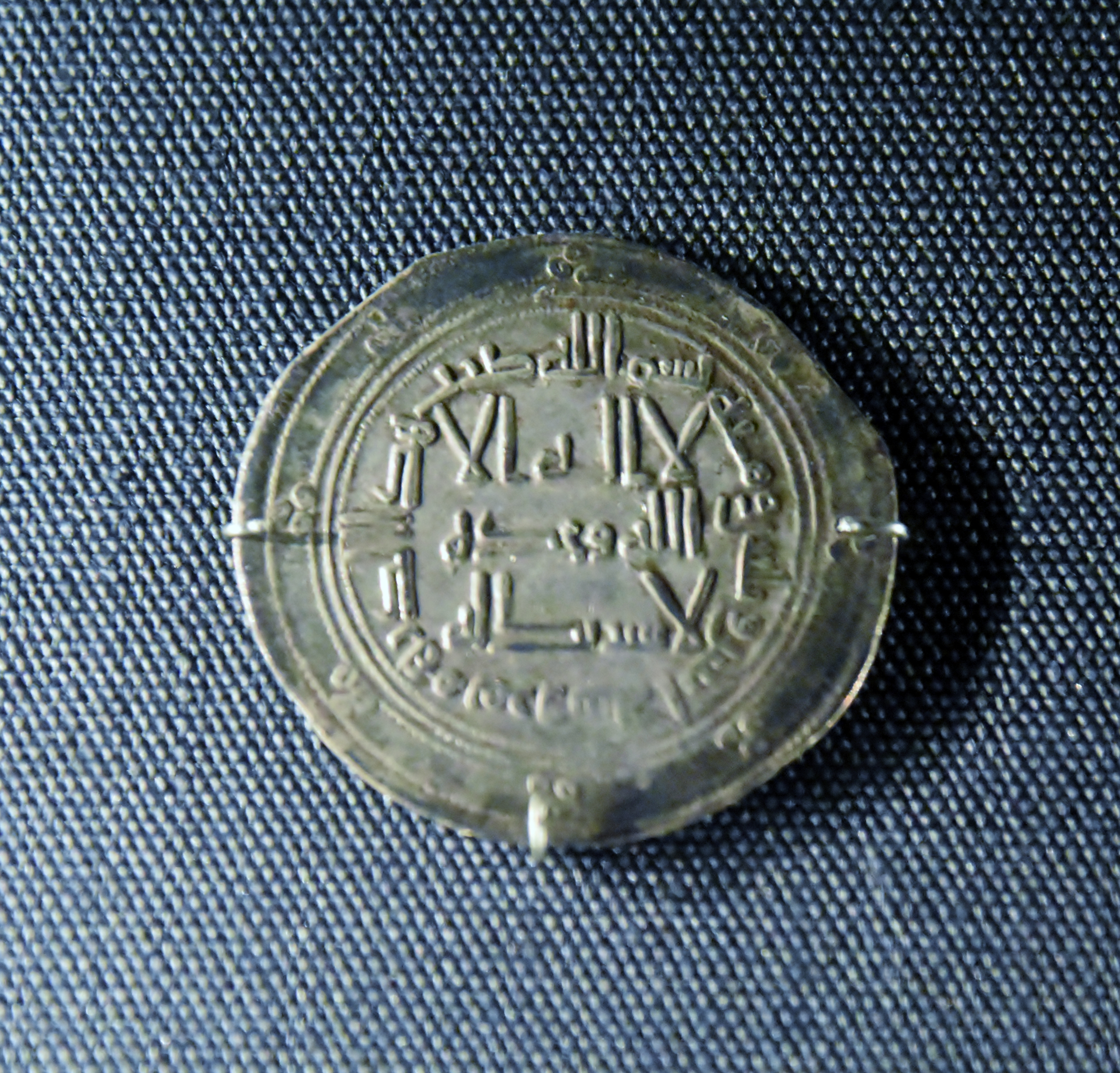
Abbasid silver dirham in the name of Abu Muslim struck at Merv in AH 132 (749–50)

He took Merv in December 747 (or January 748), defeating the Umayyad governor Nasr ibn Sayyar, as well as Shayban al-Khariji, a Kharijite aspirant to the caliphate. He became the de facto governor of Khurasan, and gained fame as a general in the late 740s in defeating the rebellion of Bihafarid, the leader of a syncretic Persian sect that was Mazdaist. Abu Muslim received support in suppressing the rebellion both from purist Muslims and Zoroastrians.

== Rule of Khurasan and death ==
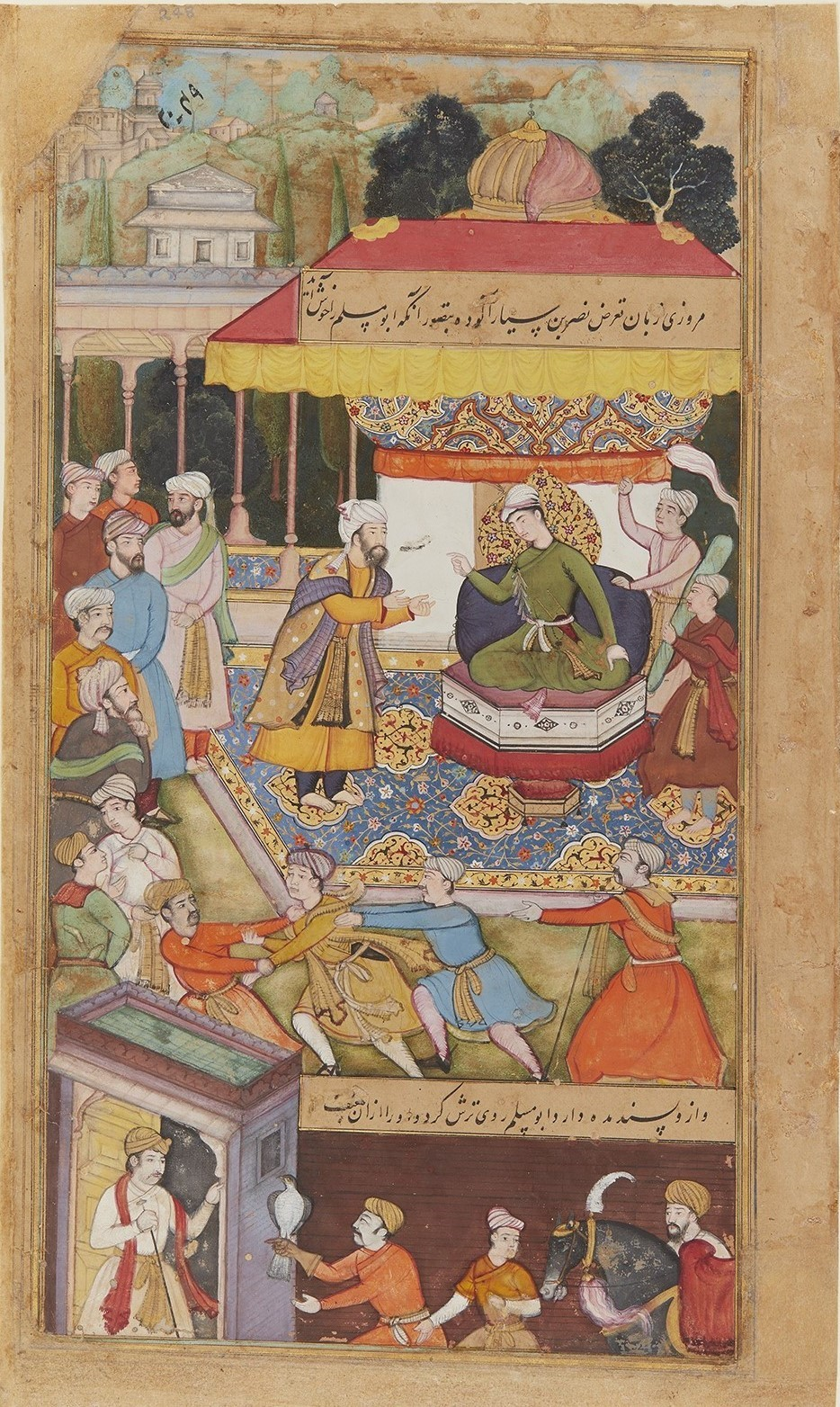
"Abu Muslim chastises a man for telling tales," Folio from the Ethics of Nasir (Akhlaq-i Nasiri) by Nasir al-Din Tusi. Copy created in Lahore between 1590 and 1595

After the establishment of the Abbasid regime, Abu Muslim remained in Khurasan as its governor. In this role he suppressed the Shi'a uprising of Sharik ibn Shaikh al-Mahri in Bukhara in 750/1, and furthered the Muslim conquest of Central Asia, sending Abu Da'ud Khalid ibn Ibrahim to campaign in the east.

His heroic role in the revolution and military skill, along with his conciliatory politics toward Shia, Sunnis, Zoroastrians, Jews, and Christians, made him extremely popular among the people. Although it appears that Abu al-'Abbas al-Saffah trusted him in general, he was wary of his power, limiting his entourage to 500 men upon his arrival to Iraq on his way to Hajj in 754. Abu al-'Abbas's brother, al-Mansur (r. 754–775), advised al-Saffah on more than one occasion to have Abu Muslim killed, fearing his rising influence and popularity. It seems that this dislike was mutual, with Abu Muslim aspiring to more power and looking down in disdain on al-Mansur, feeling al-Mansur owed Abu Muslim for his position. When the new caliph's uncle, Abdullah ibn Ali rebelled, Abu Muslim was requested by al-Mansur to crush this rebellion, which he did, and Abdullah was given to his nephew as a prisoner. Abdullah was ultimately executed.

Relations deteriorated quickly when al-Mansur sent his chamberlain Abu-al Khasib to inventory the spoils of war, and then appointed Abu Muslim governor of Syria and Egypt, outside his powerbase. After an increasingly acrimonious correspondence between Abu Muslim and al-Mansur, Abu Muslim feared he was going to be killed if he appeared in the presence of the Caliph. He later changed his mind and decided to appear in his presence due to a combination of perceived disobedience, al-Mansur's promise to keep him as governor of Khurasan, and the assurances of some of his close aides, some of whom were bribed by al-Mansur. He went to Iraq to meet al-Mansur in al-Mada'in in 755. Al-Mansur proceeded to enumerate his grievances against Abu Muslim, who kept reminding the Caliph of his efforts to enthrone him. Against Abu Muslim were also charges of being a zindiq or heretic. Al-Mansur then signaled five of his guards behind a portico to kill him. Abu Muslim's mutilated body was thrown in the river Tigris, and his commanders were bribed to acquiesce to the murder.

== Allegations of Crypto-Zoroastrianism ==
Abu Muslim's eventual downfall and execution on charges of heresy have contributed to doubts cast on the sincerity of his Islamic faith. In particular this includes his close relationship with the mobad Sunpadh and his repeated praise of Zoroastrianism.

Following his successful campaign in Gorgan, there is a report of a tribesman being able to bypass Abu Muslim's line and relay news of the Umayyad's destruction by shaving his beard, donning a kushti, and pretending to be a Zoroastrian (tassabbaha bi'l-majus), which suggests his ranks were of Zoroastrian origin.

Furthermore, there are records indicating that Abu Muslim planned to execute all Arabic speakers in Khorasan, though historian Farouk Omar dismissed this claim, stating: "These [claims] are not agreed upon by historians, therefore they cannot be accepted without scrutiny."

In the Siyasatnameh, Nizam al-Mulk emphasized that Abu Muslim had a talent for appealing to Zoroastrian revivalism.

Whenever he was alone with Zoroastrians, he would say, "According to one of the books of the Sasanians which I have found, the Arab empire is finished. I shall not turn back until I have destroyed the Kaaba, for this has been [wrongly] substituted for the sun; we shall make the sun our qibla as it was in olden time"

Despite his assistance in crushing Behafarid's heresy and the possibility of his own Zoroastrian sympathies, Abu Muslim has not been remembered favourably by the Zoroastrian Orthodoxy in the Middle Persian tradition, as both the Zand-i Wahman yasn and Zaratosht-nama censure Abu Muslim.

== Legacy ==
His murder was not well received by the residents of Khurasan, and there was resentment and rebellion among the population over the brutal methods used by al-Mansur. He became a legendary figure for many in Persia, and several Persian heretics started revolts claiming he had not died and would return; the latter included his own propagandist Ishaq al-Turk, the Zoroastrian cleric Sunpadh in Nishapur, the Abu Muslimiyya subsect of the Kaysanites Shi'a, and al-Muqanna in Khurasan. Even Babak claimed descent from him.

There are different variations of legends about Abu Muslim and forms of his worship in Central Asia, Iran and Afghanistan. Depending on particular local traditions, some local saints are legitimized through an imaginary connection with Abu Muslim.

== Books ==
At least three epic romances were written about him:

- Marzubānī, Muḥammad ibn ʻImrān, Akhbār Abu Muslim al Khurasani
- Muḥammad ibn Ḥasan, Abū Ṭāhir Ṭarsūsī, Abū Muslimʹnāmah
- Zidan, Jorji, Abu Muslim al-Khurasani

== See also ==
- Babak Khorramdin
- Sunpadh, or Sinbad the Magus
- Behafarid
- al-Muqanna
