= Mazdakism =

Ancient Iranian religion

Mazdakism (Persian: مزدکیه, romanized: mazdakīye) was an Iranian offshoot of Zoroastrianism.

The religion was founded in the early Sasanian Empire by Zaradust-e Khuragen, a Zoroastrian mobad who was a contemporary of Mani (d. 274). However, it is named after its most prominent advocate, Mazdak, who was a powerful and controversial figure during the reign of Emperor Kavad I (r. 498–531), until he was killed by Emperor Khusrau I (r. 531–579).

== Theology ==
Mazdakism was a dualistic religion that emerged from Zoroastrian thought, teaching about principles of light and darkness, the mixture of which were said to have created the world. Mazdakites believed it was their duty to defeat the darkness and evil in the world.

Zaradust and Mazdak may have been influenced by Manichaeanism; however, unlike many Manichaean or Gnostic sects, they eschewed asceticism and did not teach that the world or matter were evil or needed to be renounced.

== Ethics ==
Mazdakism opposed war, and also opposed the eating of meat, except for potentially when an animal was already nearing its death of natural causes. During the period in which Kavad II was influenced by Zaradust's ideas, he tried to refrain from war and was lenient to his subjects, even enemies. However, Mazdak's followers did believe that it was permissible to use violence when in revolt against their enemies.

The movement also believed in the holding of all things in common to reduce greed. This extended not just to property, but also to the communal sharing of women. Historical accounts differ on whether this belief amounted an intent to entirely abolish private property and marriage, or whether Mazdak simply intended to redistribute property from the wealthy to the poor and end the practice of polygamy.

== See also ==
- List of Zoroastrianism sects
