= Mazdak =

Iranian religious figure

- مزدک
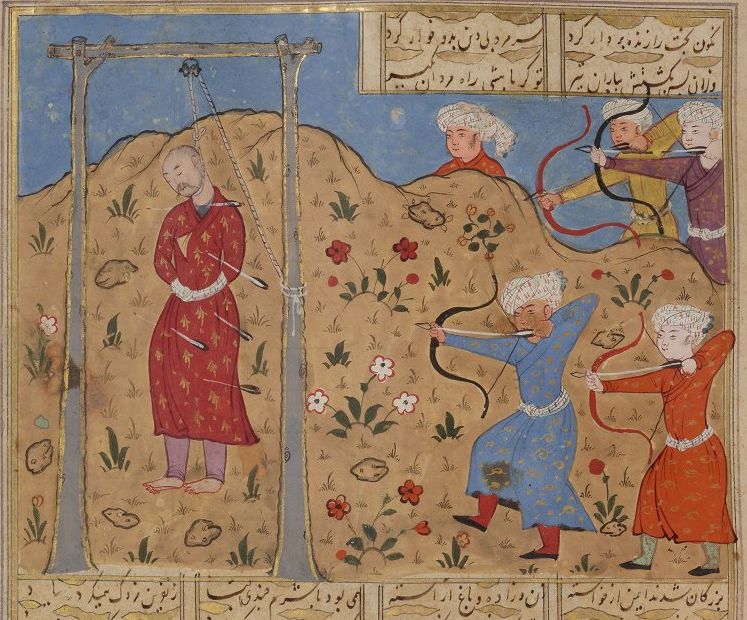
- Illustration of the execution of Mazdak from a copy of the Shahnameh
- Born: Mazdak Bamdadan; Mazariya, Pasa or Istakhr
- Died: c. 524 or 528 (Other say 529 or 531); Ctesiphon
- Cause of death: Execution
- Other names: Mazdaku, Mazdaka, Mazhdaq
- Occupations: Mobad, social reformer
- Years active: c. 480s – 520s
- Known for: Mazdakism
- Spouse: Hamzah (daughter of Fadeh)
- Parent: Bamdad (father)

Ecclesiastical career
- Religion: Zoroastrianism (Mazdakite sect)

Mazdak (Persian: مزدک; Middle Persian: 𐭬𐭦𐭣𐭪𐭩; also known as Mazdak Bamdadan; d. c. 524 or 528) was an Iranian Zoroastrian mobad (priest) and social reformer who rose to prominence during the reign of the Sasanian emperor Kavadh I. He instituted a religious and social movement known as Mazdakism, which preached a dualistic cosmology and social welfare programs, including the communal ownership of property and, controversially, women (interpreted by some scholars as a reaction against the harem system).

Although initially supported by King Kavadh I to weaken the power of the nobility and clergy, Mazdak and his followers were eventually purged by Kavadh's son, Khosrow I (Anushiravan). His ideology survived in various forms, influencing later movements such as the Khurramites.

== Name ==
The name Mazdak is derived from the Old Iranian word Mazda (as in Ahura Mazda), meaning "wise" or "wisdom". In Avestan, it is an attribute of God. The name appears in various forms in historical texts, including Mazdaku, Mazdaka, and Mazhdaq. The earliest historical attestation of a related name dates to the 8th century BC in the inscriptions of Sargon II of Assyria, referring to Median chieftains, though this predates the Sasanian figure by over a millennium.

In Islamic sources, Al-Biruni refers to him as Mazhdaq, while Al-Masudi uses both Mazdaq and Mazdaqiyah. Al-Tabari records the name as Mazdak and occasionally Mazdaq.

== Background and origins ==
Mazdak was the son of Bamdad and lived during the reign of Kavadh I (r. 488–531). Historical sources offer conflicting accounts of his birthplace. Al-Tabari states he was from Mazariya (modern Kut), a city on the Tigris. Al-Biruni identifies his origin as Nisa in Khorasan, while Al-Dinawari claims he was from Istakhr in Fars. Other sources suggest Pasa, Tabriz in Azerbaijan, or even Nishapur.

=== Social and religious context ===
At the time of Mazdak's rise, the Sasanian Empire was facing severe crises. The defeat of Peroz I by the Hephthalites had resulted in heavy tributes, emptying the royal treasury. Domestically, the empire saw the growth of rigid class stratification and the immense power of the Zoroastrian clergy and nobility.

The Zoroastrian clergy held significant sway over the state, often amassing great wealth while the populace suffered. The strict formalism of the state religion had created dissatisfaction, paving the way for the appeal of Manichaeism and Mazdakism.

During the early reign of Kavadh I, severe droughts and locust swarms caused widespread famine.

The nobility practiced polygamy and maintained large harems, effectively monopolizing women and leaving many men in the lower classes without the possibility of marriage. This demographic imbalance caused significant social unrest.

== Mazdak and Kavadh I ==
According to the Shahnameh, Mazdak rose to prominence during a famine. He presented himself to King Kavadh I, arguing that the wealthy who hoarded grain while the poor starved were sinful. With the king's permission, Mazdak opened the royal granaries to the people.

Kavadh I supported Mazdak, likely for political reasons. The king sought to curb the growing power of the nobility and the Zoroastrian clergy who had previously deposed his predecessor. By aligning with Mazdak's populist movement, Kavadh aimed to weaken the aristocracy's grip on the state. However, hostile sources claim Kavadh was motivated by the Mazdakite doctrine regarding women.

With royal patronage, Mazdakism spread rapidly. Kavadh even attempted to spread the doctrine to the Arab vassals of the empire, instructing Al-Mundhir III ibn al-Nu'man of Al-Hirah to adopt the faith. When Al-Mundhir refused, he was temporarily replaced by the Kindite chief Al-Harith ibn 'Amr, who accepted the doctrine.

== Teachings ==
Mazdakism is often viewed as a reformist branch of Zoroastrianism with influences from Manichaeism.

=== Theology ===
Mazdak's theology was dualistic, positing the existence of two original principles: Light (Good) and Darkness (Evil). Unlike Mani, who viewed the mixture of Light and Dark as a cosmic tragedy to be escaped, Mazdak viewed the struggle more optimistically. A key distinction was that Mazdak believed Light acted through free will and design, while Darkness acted blindly and randomly. Sources suggest Mazdak's teachings were based on an earlier figure named Zardusht-e Khuragan (also known as Bundos), a Manichaean preacher who had diverged from mainstream Manichaeism (known as the Drust-din sect).

=== Social principles ===
Mazdak preached that God created the earth's resources to be shared equally among all humans. He argued that the strong had encroached upon the weak, causing inequality. His "Five Demons" to be combated were Envy, Wrath, Vengeance, Need, and Greed.

- Sharing of property: Mazdak advocated for the redistribution of wealth to eliminate poverty.
- Sharing of women: This is the most controversial aspect of his teaching. Hostile sources interpret this as total promiscuity or wife-sharing. However, modern scholars suggest this was likely a measure against the hoarding of women in the harems of the nobility, intending to break the exclusive lineage system of the aristocracy and allow poor men to marry.
- Pacifism: Mazdak prohibited the slaughter of animals and the eating of meat, advocating for a vegetarian diet and peaceful conduct.

=== The debate and execution ===
According to the Shahnameh and other sources, Prince Khosrow arranged a religious debate where Zoroastrian Mobads and Christian bishops challenged Mazdak. After Mazdak was declared defeated in the debate, Khosrow ordered a massacre.

The execution is famously described in the Shahnameh: Khosrow planted 3,000 Mazdakites head-down in a garden, with their legs in the air, resembling trees. He then invited Mazdak to view this "garden" before hanging Mazdak upside down and having him shot with arrows. Other sources, such as the Siyasatnama, claim Khosrow invited the Mazdakites to a banquet to receive robes of honor, only to have them slaughtered. The massacre reportedly took place on the feast of Mehrgan, possibly near Ctesiphon.

== Followers ==
Mazdak's teaching acquired many followers, to the point when even King Kavadh I, ruling from 488 until 531, converted to Mazdakism. He also reportedly sponsored its adoption by the Arab vassal kingdom of al-Hirah, entailing the deposing of the previous king al-Mundhir by the Kindite chief al-Harith.

With the King's backing Mazdak could embark on a program of social reform, which involved pacifism, anti-clericalism and aid programs for helping the poor. Mazdak had government warehouses opened to help the poor. He also had all the Zoroastrian fire temples closed except the three major ones.

== Jewish tradition ==
A Jewish tradition relates a slightly different story. The Exilarch of Babylon, Mar-Zutra II, rallied the Jewish community and their allies, who defeated Mazdak and established an independent Jewish kingdom in Mahoza that lasted for seven years (495–502).

== Historicity ==
The historicity of the persona of Mazdak has been questioned. He may have been a fabrication to take blame away from Kavad. Contemporary historians, including Procopius and Joshua the Stylite make no mention of Mazdak naming Kavad as the figure behind the movement. Mention of Mazdak only emerges in later Middle Persian Zoroastrian documents, namely the Bundahishn, the Denkard, and the Zand-i Wahman yasn. Later Islamic-era sources, particularly al-Tabari's work, also mention Mazdak. These later writings were perhaps corrupted by Iranian oral folklore, given that blame put on Mazdak for the redistribution of aristocratic properties to the people, is a topic repeated in Iranian oral history. Other "villains" in Iranian history, namely Gaumata in the Behistun Inscription of the Achaemenid ruler Darius the Great (r. 522 – 486 BC), and Wahnam in the Paikuli inscription of the Sasanian shah Narseh (r. 293–302), are frequently accused of similar misdeeds.

== Legacy ==
A few Mazdakites survived and settled in remote areas. Small pockets of Mazdakite societies are said to have survived for centuries after the Muslim conquest of Persia. Their doctrines probably mixed with radical currents of Shia Islam, influencing them and giving rise to later powerful revolutionary-religious movements in the region. The cult of al-Muqanna‘, who claimed to be the incarnation of God and had followers among the Mubaiyyidah sect of Zoroastrianism and even some Turks, upheld the laws and institutes of Mazdak. In the 9th century, the Khurramites, an egalitarian religious sect possibly originating from Mazdakism, led a revolt under the leadership of Babak Khorramdin against the Abbasid Caliphate and successfully defended large territories against the Caliphate's forces for some twenty years. The Batiniyya, Qarmatians and other later revolutionary currents of Islam may also be connected to Mazdakism and were often equated with it by contemporary authors.

Turkish scholar Abdülbâkî Gölpınarlı sees even the Qizilbash of the 16th century – a radical Shi'i movement in Persia which helped the Safaviyya establish Twelver Islam as the dominant religion of Iran – as "spiritual descendants of the Khurramites" and, hence, of the Mazdakites. "Mazdakist" eventually seems to have become a standard derogative label attached by pre-modern Persian and Arabic authors to any radical egalitarian movement in subsequent Iranian history. While medieval Muslim historiography primarily focused on the "socialist" aspects of Mazdak, Zoroastrian tradition, on the other hand, remembers Mazdak above all as a dangerous heretic and enemy of the true faith (Zand-i Wahman yasn 2:1).

The author of the Dabestan-e Mazaheb, writing as late as the 17th century, claims to have met individual adherents of Mazdakism who practised their religion secretly among the Muslims and preserved the Desnad, a book in Middle Persian containing the teachings of Mazdak.

Philosopher and poet Muhammad Iqbal, who inspired the Pakistan Movement in British India, termed Karl Marx as the modern reincarnation of Mazdakite thought. In the poem Ibless ki Majlis-e-Shura, he drew similarities between Marxism and Mazadak thought of redistribution of excess, reduction of the importance of religious formality, emancipation of love and social revolution. Iqbal describes Karl Marx as reincarnation of the soul of Mazdak. These views penned in 1936, when Russian Revolution was still fledgling, remained skeptical if Mazdakite logic of Marxism was the solution of problems of the poor and the downtrodden. Iqbal devotes a chapter on Mazdak in his PhD thesis with the Ludwig-Maximilians-Universität München on The Development of Metaphysics in Persia.

== See also ==
- List of Persian figures in the Sasanian era
- Mandaeism
- Proto-Indo-Iranian religion
- Yazdânism

== Bibliography ==
- Alavi, Parto (1974). A Brief History of Mazdak. Tehran: Andisheh.
- Christensen, Arthur (1995). The Reign of King Kavadh and the Appearance of Mazdak. Translated by Ahmad Birashk. Tehran: Tahuri.
- Christensen, Arthur (2006). Iran during the Sassanids. Translated by Rashid Yasemi. Tehran: Sedaye Moaser.
- Daryaee, Touraj (2018). Sasanian Empire. Translated by Morteza Sagheb Far. Tehran: Qoqnoos.
- Klima, Otakar (2006). History of the Mazdakite Movement. Translated by Jahangir Fekri Ershad. Tehran: Toos.
