= Sunpadh =

8th-century Iranian nobleman and rebel

Sunpadh (Persian: سندپاد; also spelled Sunpad and Sunbadh) was an Iranian nobleman from the House of Karen, who incited an uprising against the Abbasid Caliphate in the 8th century.

== Background ==
Sunpadh was a Zoroastrian nobleman, who was a native of a village called Ahan in Nishapur, Khorasan. He most likely belonged to the ancient House of Karen, formerly one of the seven great houses of the pre-Islamic Parthian and Sasanian eras. Khorasan had originally been a fief of the Karenids, but the family lost control of the province at the battle of Nishapur during the Arab conquest of Iran, thus forcing many Karenid nobles to withdraw to Tabaristan, where a branch of the family, the Qarinvand dynasty, had managed to withstand the Arab incursions.

== Revolt ==
Following the betrayal and subsequent death of the Iranian general Abu Muslim by the Abbasid caliph al-Mansur (r. 754–775) in 755, the enraged Sunpadh revolted. He captured the cities of Nishapur, Qumis, and Ray, and was called "Firuz ispahbadh" ("the victorious ispahbadh"). At Ray, he seized the treasuries of Abu Muslim. Most of his supporters were from Jibal and Tabaristan—the Dabuyid ruler, Khurshid (r. 740–760), supported the anti-Abbasid rebellion of Sunpadh, and was in return given a part of Abu Muslim's treasure.

According to Nizam al-Mulk, Ibn al-Athir, and Mirkhvand, Sunpadh swore to march on Mecca and destroy the Kaaba. However, according to Patricia Crone, this is unlikely, who says "the idea that he should have rushed off in anger from Nishapur in order singlehandedly to bring down the caliphate and Islam is absurd." Other sources state that Sunpadh declared himself as a prophet, and disagreed on Abu Muslim's death, claiming to be his mediator. Sunpadh allegedly further preached that "Abu Muslim has not died, and when Mansur meant to slay him, he chanted God's great name, turned into a white dove and flew away. Now he is standing with Mahdi and Mazdak in a castle of copper and they shall emerge by and by." This, however, is a misrepresentation of Sunpadh, whose intention by revolting, was most likely to remove the Muslims from power.

A force of 10,000 Abbasid troops under Jahwar ibn Marrar al-Ijli was shortly sent towards Sunpadh—they clashed between Hamadan and Ray, where Sunpadh was defeated and routed. According to the historian Ibn Isfandiyar, such a countless number of Abu Muslim's and Sunpadh's supporters were killed in the defeat that their bones were still noticeable in 912. Sunpadh then fled to Tabaristan, but was killed there by one of Khurshid's cousins, ostensibly because he had failed to show the man proper respect. It is possible, however, that the murder was instigated by Khurshid, in the hope of acquiring the remainder of Abu Muslim's treasure.

== Sources ==
- Crone, Patricia (2012). The Nativist Prophets of Early Islamic Iran: Rural Revolt and Local Zoroastrianism. Cambridge University Press. ISBN 9781139510769.
- McAuliffe, Jane Dammen, ed. (1995). The History of al-Ṭabarī, Volume XXVIII: The ʿAbbāsid Authority Affirmed: The Early Years of al-Mansūr, A.D. 753–763/A.H. 136–145. SUNY Series in Near Eastern Studies. Albany, New York: State University of New York Press. ISBN 978-0-7914-1895-6.
- Pourshariati, Parvaneh (2008). Decline and Fall of the Sasanian Empire: The Sasanian-Parthian Confederacy and the Arab Conquest of Iran. London and New York: I.B. Tauris. ISBN 978-1-84511-645-3.
- Pourshariati, Parvaneh (2017). "Kārin". Encyclopaedia Iranica.
