= Assamah ibn Amr al-Ma'afiri =

Assamah ibn Amr al-Ma'afiri (Arabic: عسامة بن عمرو المعافري) (died 792) was a governor of Egypt for the Abbasid Caliphate in 785.

== Life ==
Assamah was a leading member of the Egyptian wujuh, the Arab elite who dominated local affairs in the province during the early Islamic era. An early mention of him occurs during the revolt of Muhammad the Pure Soul in 762–763, when according to one version of events he was arrested and sent to Iraq for having helped Muhammad's son Ali hide from the government authorities, before eventually being released by the caliph al-Mahdi and allowed to return to Egypt. Despite his imprisonment he remained in high standing in the province, and in the following years he repeatedly served as sahib al-shurtah or chief of the Egyptian security forces, with six different governors appointing him to that office between 779 and 787.

Following the killing of the governor Musa ibn Mus'ab al-Khath'ami in 785, Assamah took over his position and assumed command of the campaign to seize back control of the country from the rebel Dihyah ibn Mus'ab. Upon learning that Dihyah's lieutenant Yusuf ibn Nusayr al-Tujibi was preparing to assault the capital Fustat, the new governor sent his brother Bakkar to meet the insurgents in battle; the resulting encounter however proved to be a draw after Yusuf and Bakkar killed each other in single combat, causing their now leaderless armies to withdraw in confusion. A short time later, Assamah learned that he had been dismissed and replaced with al-Fadl ibn Salih, and his governorship was brought to an end after having lasted for around three months.

In 792 Assamah was appointed to manage Egypt's affairs while the governor Ibrahim ibn Salih was absent from the province, but he died a few months later. His family continued to be influential within the province in the decades following his death, with his son Muhammad likewise being sahib al-shurtah in the early ninth century.

== Notes ==
Preceded by Musa ibn Mus'ab al-Khath'ami	Governor of Egypt; 785	Succeeded by Al-Fadl ibn Salih
