= Malik ibn Dalham al-Kalbi =

Abbasid governor of Egypt

Malik ibn Dalham al-Kalbi مالك بن دلهم الكلبي

Abbasid Governor of Egypt
- In office 808 – 808 (nine months)
- Monarch: Harun al-Rashīd
- Preceded by: Al-Husayn ibn Jamil
- Succeeded by: Al-Hasan ibn al-Takhtakh

Personal details
- Parent: Dalham (father)

Malik ibn Dalham al-Kalbi (Arabic: مالك بن دلهم الكلبي) was a governor of Egypt for the Abbasid Caliphate, serving there for a part of 808.

== Governorship ==
He was appointed to Egypt by the caliph Harun al-Rashid, and he arrived in the province to take up his position in early 808. Upon his entry the army commander Yahya ibn Mu'adh ibn Muslim ended his stay in the Hawf District, where he had been pacifying a rebellion that had broken out under Malik's predecessor al-Husayn ibn Jamil, and set up residence in the provincial capital of Fustat instead. After Yahya subsequently received orders to return to the caliphal court he wrote to the people of the Hawf, requesting that they present themselves to Malik in order to reach a settlement with the governor on issues on taxation. The heads of the local Yaman and Qays factions accordingly showed up for the meeting, but this proved to be a trap and they were instead seized, put in chains and sent as prisoners to the caliph.

Malik remained as governor until late 808, when he was dismissed and replaced with al-Hasan ibn al-Takhtakh.

== Notes ==
Preceded by Al-Husayn ibn Jamil	Governor of Egypt; 808	Succeeded by Al-Hasan ibn al-Takhtakh
