= Al-Husayn ibn Jamil =

Abbasid governor of Egypt

Al-Husayn ibn Jamil الحسين بن جميل

Abbasid Governor of Egypt
- In office 806–808
- Monarch: Harun al-Rashīd
- Preceded by: Abdallah ibn Muhammad ibn Ibrahim al-Zaynabi
- Succeeded by: Malik ibn Dalham al-Kalbi

Personal details
- Parent: Jamil (father)

Al-Husayn ibn Jamil (Arabic: الحسين بن جميل) was a governor of Egypt for the Abbasid Caliphate, from 806 to 808.

== Career ==
Al-Husayn was a mawla ("client"), being described as "mawla amir al-mu'minin" and "mawla Abi Ja'far al-Mansur." During the caliphate of Harun al-Rashid (r. 786–809) he appears to have been appointed as governor of Basra at an unspecified date. In 806 he was appointed over Egypt, arriving in the province in July of that year. Initially his mandate was limited to matters of prayers and security (salah) but at a later date he was granted control over the provincial finances (kharaj) as well.

During al-Husayn's governorship, the residents of the Hawf district refused to pay their taxes and rose up in rebellion. A thousand men under Abu al-Nida cut off the road to Ayla and advanced into the region of Syria, where they proceeded to engage in looting and killing. The disturbances eventually grew serious enough for the caliph to dispatch Yahya ibn Mu'adh ibn Muslim with an army to quell the uprising. After arriving in Palestine Yahya received reinforcements sent by al-Husayn, and soon afterwards the Egyptian forces were able to defeat the rebels in battle and capture Abu al-Nida. Yahya then proceeded to the Hawf and took up residence in Bilbays, where he reimposed order and ensured the resumption of tax payments.

In 808 al-Husayn was dismissed from his position and replaced with Malik ibn Dalham al-Kalbi.

== Notes ==
Preceded by Abdallah ibn Muhammad ibn Ibrahim al-Zaynabi	Governor of Egypt; 806–808	Succeeded by Malik ibn Dalham al-Kalbi
