= Ahmad ibn Isma'il ibn Ali al-Hashimi =

Provincial Abbasid governor

Ahmad ibn Isma'il ibn Ali أحمد بن إسماعيل بن علي الهاشمي

Abbasid Governor of Mosul
- In office 781–783/5
- Monarch: Al-Mahdi
- Preceded by: Muhammad ibn al-Fadl
- Succeeded by: Musa ibn Mus'ab

Abbasid Governor of Mecca
- In office 784/85–785/86
- Monarchs: Al-Mahdi again appointed by Harun al-Rashid

Abbasid Governor of Yemen
- In office 791–791
- Monarch: Harun al-Rashid
- Preceded by: Abdallah ibn Mus'ab al-Zubayri
- Succeeded by: Ibrahim ibn Ubaydallah al-Hajbi

Abbasid Governor of Egypt
- In office 803–805
- Monarch: Harun al rashid
- Preceded by: Al-Layth ibn al-Fadl
- Succeeded by: Abdallah ibn Muhammad ibn Ibrahim al-Zaynabi

Personal details
- Relations: Abbasid dynasty
- Parent: Isma'il ibn Ali al-Hashimi (father)

Ahmad ibn Isma'il ibn Ali (Arabic: أحمد بن إسماعيل بن علي الهاشمي) was a minor Abbasid personage and provincial governor who was active in the late eighth and early ninth centuries.

== Life ==
Ahmad was the son of Isma'il and a grandson of Ali ibn Abdallah ibn al-Abbas, and was a first cousin of the first two Abbasid caliphs al-Saffah (r. 750–754) and al-Mansur (r. 754–775). During the caliphate of al-Mahdi (r. 775–785) he was appointed to the governorship of Mosul (781–783/5) and later became al-Mahdi's final governor of Mecca. Under Harun al-Rashid (r. 786–809) he was again appointed to Mecca and also served as governor of the Yemen (c. 797).

In 803 he was appointed as governor of Egypt. During his tenure in that province, he received an appeal from the Aghlabid governor of Ifriqiya Ibrahim ibn al-Aghlab for help to quell disturbances in the region of Tripoli. He remained in Egypt in two years, before being dismissed and replaced with Abdallah ibn Muhammad ibn Ibrahim al-Zaynabi in 805.

== Notes ==
Preceded by Muhammad ibn al-Fadl	Governor of Mosul; 781–783/5	Succeeded by Musa ibn Mus'ab al-Khath'ami
Preceded by Abdallah ibn Mus'ab al-Zubayri (?)	Abbasid governor of the Yemen c. 791	Succeeded by Ibrahim ibn Ubaydallah al-Hajbi (?)
Preceded by Al-Layth ibn al-Fadl	Governor of Egypt; 803–805	Succeeded by Abdallah ibn Muhammad ibn Ibrahim al-Zaynabi
