= Al-Abbas =

al-Abbas اَلْعَبَّاسُ
- Pronunciation: Al-Abbasi, Abbas
- Gender: Male

Origin
- Origin: Semitic (Arabic)
- Region of origin: Arabia (Middle East)

al-Abbas (Arabic: ٱلْعَبَّاسٌ) or Abbas is an Arabic name that goes back to al-Abbas ibn Abd al-Muttalib, an uncle of the Islamic prophet Muhammad.

People with the name include:

- Abbas ibn Abd al-Muttalib (c. 566–653), a paternal uncle and companion of the Islamic prophet Muhammad; forefather of the Abbasids.
- Abbas ibn Ali (c. 647–680), a son of Ali ibn Abi Talib.
- al-Abbas ibn al-Walid (died 750), an Umayyad prince and General, the son of caliph al-Walid I. He fought in the Arab–Byzantine wars of the early 8th century.
- al-Abbas ibn al-Ma'mun (died 838), an Abbasid prince and general, the son of caliph al-Ma'mun. He fought in the Arab–Byzantine wars of the 9th century.
- al-Abbas ibn Musa (died 815), a member of the Abbasid Cadet branch. He held various posts in the Abbasid Empire during the late eighth and early ninth centuries.
- al-Abbas ibn al-Hadi, son of the Abbasid caliph al-Hadi (r. 785–786).
- al-Abbas ibn al-Mu'tamid, son of the Abbasid caliph al-Mu'tamid (r. 870–892).
- al-Abbas ibn al-Mu'tadid, son of the Abbasid caliph al-Mu'tadid (r. 892–902).
- al-Abbas ibn al-Radi, son of the Abbasid caliph al-Radi (r. 934–940).
