= Homs revolts (854–855) =

Wars in Syria

The Homs revolts of 854–855 were a series of armed uprisings that took place in Homs in northern Syria. During the autumns of both 854 and 855 the city's inhabitants attempted to rebel against local government officials, resulting in both instances in several fatalities and necessitating the intervention of the Abbasid central government in response. The second revolt also resulted in the promulgation of a number of anti-Christian edicts due to the participation of a portion of the city's Christians in the incident.

== Background ==
Map showing Hims (upper-middle right) in Syria in the 9th century

In the early Islamic period, Homs (in Arabic: Ḥimṣ) was one of the chief cities of the province of Syria, being the capital of one of its five military districts during the era of the Umayyad Caliphate (661–750). After the Syrian-based Umayyads were replaced by the Iraq-centric Abbasids, however, the city entered a turbulent period, in which tribal factionalism and the ambitions of the local ashraf triggered regular outbreaks of disorder. Beginning in the reign of Harun al-Rashid (786–809), the central government was compelled to send numerous punitive expeditions against Homs and its vicinity, and the city's reputation for rebellion became even greater following the end of the Fourth Civil War in Syria (c. 825). As a result of these activities, the city gradually became known as the dominant arena for unrest in the region, a status which peaked in the middle of the ninth century.

== Events of 854 ==
The first revolt occurred in October–November 854, when the city inhabitants rose up and attacked the chief of security police Abu al-Mughith Musa ibn Ibrahim. According to the chronicler al-Tabari, the unrest had been provoked by Abu al-Mughith's killing of one of the local city leaders, although the reason for this act is not known. In the resulting fighting, several of Abu al-Mughith's men were killed and he was forced to flee to Hama, while the supervisor of taxation was also expelled from the city.

Upon learning what had transpired, the caliph al-Mutawakkil dispatched Attab ibn Attab al-Qaid and Muhammad ibn Abdawayh to the city. Attab was instructed by the caliph to present Ibn Abdawayh to the Homsis, offering him as a replacement to Abu al-Mughith; if they however refused the choice and continued to resist, he was to request that troops be sent against the city. In the end the inhabitants agreed to the offer, allowing Ibn Abdawayh to establish himself in Homs and assume Abu al-Mughith's former position there.

== Events of 855 ==
Twelve months after the first revolt, a second rebellion broke out in Homs, this time directed against Ibn Abdawayh. On this occasion some of the city's Christians became involved in the unrest, with several supporting the rebel cause. No reasons are specified by the sources for this round of violence, although grievances regarding taxation may have been a factor.

The government response to the revolt was swift. Ibn Abdawayh sent a report about the incident to al-Mutawakkil, who responded by instructing him to resist the rioters. Reinforcements soon arrived from Damascus, whose garrison and governor Salih al-Abbasi had been ordered by the caliph to assist Ibn Abdawayh, as well as from the troops at Ramla in Palestine. Bolstered by this support, the governor was able to defeat the revolt, and several of its leaders were soon placed into custody.

Following this second incident of hostilities, al-Mutawakkil decided to punish the city residents by making a public example out of their leaders. Ibn Abdawayh was ordered to flog three of the local chiefs to death and crucify their bodies in front of their residences, while twenty more individuals were to each receive thirty lashes and then be sent to the Abbasid capital, Samarra. Ten notables were subsequently returned by the caliph back to Homs, where they were whipped to death and their bodies hanged upon the city gate. One rebel who was captured after the initial bout of violence had subsided was flogged until he died, and his body was suspended on a cross at a nearby fortress.

In retaliation for their involvement in the rebellion, the city's Christians were also subjected to a number of punitive measures. Al-Mutawakkil ordered the governor to expel the entire Christian population from the city, and any Christian found in Homs after three days' time was to be harshly treated. All churches and places of worship in the city were to be destroyed, while a Christian building located next to the mosque was to be annexed to the latter.

== Aftermath ==
As a reward for their role in suppressing the second revolt, Ibn Abdawayh and his officers received a sizable monetary sum from the caliph, as well as gifts and robes of honor.

The orders regarding Homs' Christians came on the heels of previous anti-dhimmi regulations issued by al-Mutawakkil in 850 and 853, which had placed various restrictions on non-Muslims throughout the empire. To what extent these orders were actually enforced, however, is not clear, and the main church of Homs is known to have still been extant in the following centuries.

Homs was the scene of further revolts in 862 and 864, in the course of which one governor, Kaydar ibn Abdallah al-Ushrusani, was expelled and a second, al-Fadl ibn Qarin al-Tabari, was killed. The city subsequently drifted out of Abbasid control in 878, when Syria was annexed by the Tulunid emir Ahmad ibn Tulun.
