= Abd al-Malik ibn Salih =

Abbasid general and provincial governor (750–812)

Abd al-Malik ibn Salih عبد الملك بن صالح

Abbasid governor of Mosul
- In office 785–787
- Monarchs: Musa al-Hadi, Harun al-Rashid
- Preceded by: Hashim ibn Sa'id (785)
- Succeeded by: Ishaq ibn Muhammed (787–778)

Abbasid governor of Medina
- In office 787–789
- Monarch: Harun al-Rashid
- Preceded by: Ishaq ibn Sulayman al-Hashimi
- Succeeded by: Muhammad ibn Abdallah al-Raba'i (789 – 790s)

Abbasid governor of Syria
- In office 793–795
- Monarch: Harun al-Rashid
- Preceded by: Musa ibn Yahya
- Succeeded by: Ishaq ibn Isa ibn Ali (c. 795 – 800s)

Abbasid governor of Egypt
- In office 795 – 795 (Less than a year)
- Monarch: Harun al-Rashid
- Preceded by: Harthama ibn A'yan
- Succeeded by: Abdallah ibn al-Musayyab al-Dabbi

Personal details
- Born: 750
- Died: 812
- Relations: Abbasid dynasty
- Children: Abd al-Rahman
- Parent: Salih ibn Ali (father)
- Relatives: Al-Fadl (brother); Ibrahim (brother); Isma'il (brother)

Military service
- Allegiance: Abbasid Caliphate
- Years of service: 789–812
- Rank: General
- Battles/wars: Arab–Byzantine wars

ʿAbd al-Malik ibn Ṣāliḥ ibn ʿAlī (Arabic: عبد الملك بن صالح بن علي) (Ἀβιμελέχ, Abimelech, in Greek sources; 750–812 CE) was a member of the Abbasid dynasty who served as general and governor in Syria and Egypt. He distinguished himself in several raids against the Byzantine Empire, but his great influence and authority in Syria resulted in Caliph Harun al-Rashid imprisoning him in 803. Released in 809, he was dispatched in 812 by Caliph al-Amin to gather troops against his brother al-Ma'mun in the ongoing civil war between the two brothers, but died of an illness.

== Biography ==
Abd al-Malik's family were among the most powerful clans during the early Abbasid era. They played an important role in the final overthrow of the Umayyads in Syria, which thereafter became their particular power base. He was the nephew of Abd Allah ibn Ali, the first Abbasid governor of Syria, and a son of Salih ibn Ali, the first Abbasid governor of Egypt and successor of Abdallah in Syria after the latter staged a failed uprising in 754. Abd al-Malik's elder brothers al-Fadl and Ibrahim also served as governors in Syria and Egypt. From his father's side, he was a cousin of Caliphs al-Saffah (r. 750–754) and al-Mansur (r. 754–775). His mother was one of the concubines of the last Umayyad Caliph, Marwan II (r. 744–750). After Marwan's death, she was bought by Salih. Some sources alleged that she was already pregnant at the time, which would mean that Abd al-Malik was a son of Marwan II.

Under Harun al-Rashid (r. 786–809), Abd al-Malik held his first major commands: from c. 789 to 793, he was governor of the strategically critical Jund Qinnasrin (a district in northern Syria) and of the newly created jund of al-Awasim, which comprised the Caliphate's borderlands with the Byzantine Empire. From this position, he led expeditions into Byzantine Asia Minor in 790/791 and possibly also in 792/793, when his son Abd al-Rahman captured the fortress of Thebasa.

In 792, after the death of Ibrahim, Abd al-Malik became the head of his clan, and in 794 he was appointed as governor of the Jund Dimashq (a Syrian district which included Damascus), with his brother Abdallah succeeding him in governing the borderlands with the Byzantine Empire. During the next couple of years, he also served brief stints as governor of Medina and Egypt, but he was soon back on the Byzantine frontier: in late 797 he led raids into Cappadocia and Galatia, moving as far as Ancyra where he received an embassy from Empress Irene of Athens (r. 797–802) which asked for a peace agreement, but which he rebuffed. In 798, he led another campaign that reached and plundered the great Byzantine army base and imperial stables at Malagina in Bithynia. He carried off much booty, including the imperial parade horses and baggage-train. On his return, he was attacked by the forces of the themes of Opsikion and Optimatoi, but defeated them. At the same time, his son raided the city of Ephesus.

In c. 800, Abd al-Malik was also placed as tutor for Harun's son al-Qasim. His prominence and influence with the army led Harun distrust him and in 803 he was arrested and thrown into prison. The actual reason remains unclear, although most sources agree that his own son, Abd ar-Rahman, informed the Caliph that he was allegedly planning to overthrow him. Abd al-Malik remained imprisoned until Harun's death six years later, when the Caliph al-Amin (r. 809–813) released him. Al-Amin's succession was contested by his elder half-brother al-Ma'mun, and there was unrest in Syria. Abd al-Malik still wielded considerable influence over the frontier troops, and therefore he was appointed governor of Syria and al-Jazira (Upper Mesopotamia) and tasked with securing these regions for al-Amin and raising troops to confront al-Ma'mun. However, soon after reaching Raqqa, Abd al-Malik fell ill and died. His grave was demolished a few years later by the victorious al-Ma'mun, allegedly because Abd al-Malik had sworn never to accept al-Ma'mun's rule.

== Sources ==
- Cobb, Paul M. (2001). White Banners: Contention in 'Abbāsid Syria, 750–880. Albany, NY: State University of New York Press. ISBN 0-7914-4880-0.
- Lilie, Ralph-Johannes (1996). Byzanz unter Eirene und Konstantin VI. (780–802) (in German). Frankfurt am Main: Peter Lang. ISBN 3-631-30582-6.
- Mango, Cyril; Scott, Roger, eds. (1997). The Chronicle of Theophanes Confessor. Byzantine and Near Eastern History, AD 284–813. Oxford: Clarendon Press. ISBN 0-19-822568-7.
- Slane, William MacGuckin (1843). Ibn Khallikan's Biographical Dictionary, Volume 1. Paris: Oriental Translation Fund of Great Britain and Ireland.
- Lilie, Ralph-Johannes; Ludwig, Claudia; Pratsch, Thomas; Zielke, Beate (1999). "'Abd al-Malik ibn Ṣāliḥ (#19)". Prosopographie der mittelbyzantinischen Zeit: 1. Abteilung (641–867), Band 1: Aaron (# 1) – Georgios (# 2182) (in German). Berlin and Boston: De Gruyter. p. 8. ISBN 978-3-11-015179-4.
- Zetterstéen, K. V. (1960). "'Abd al-Malik ibn Sāliḥ". In Gibb, H. A. R.; Kramers, J. H.; Lévi-Provençal, E.; Schacht, J.; Lewis, B. & Pellat, Ch. (eds.). The Encyclopaedia of Islam, Second Edition. Volume I: A–B. Leiden: E. J. Brill. pp. 77–78. OCLC 495469456.

Preceded by Harthama ibn A'yan	Governor of Egypt (nominal); 795; With: Abdallah ibn al-Musayyab al-Dabbi (as resident deputy)	Succeeded by Ubaydallah ibn al-Mahdi
