= Khut Abd al-Wahid ibn Yahya =

Abbasid governor of Egypt (851–852)

Abd al-Wahid ibn Yahya, also known as Khut (Arabic: خوط عبد الواحد بن يحيى) was a ninth-century governor of Egypt for the Abbasid Caliphate, serving there from 851 until 852.

== Career ==
Khut was a great-great-grandson of Ruzayq, the progenitor of the Tahirid family. In 851 he became resident governor of Egypt on behalf of Muhammad ibn Ishaq ibn Ibrahim, who had been assigned the province by al-Muntasir, and he arrived there in May of that year. His appointment initially gave him gave him control of security and the prayers, as well as the land tax (kharaj), but in August 851 the latter authority was rescinded and for the remainder of his governorship he oversaw the first two functions alone.

During Khut's governorship, the caliph al-Mutawakkil (r. 847–861) ordered the release of the ex-qadi Muhammad ibn Abi al-Layth al-Khwarazmi from prison and had him try several individuals, including members of the Banu Ibn 'Abd al-Hakam, on charges of stealing government-owned assets. In the following year, however, the caliph commanded Khut to punish Muhammad for wasting funds from the public treasury; Khut therefore shaved Muhammad's head and beard, whipped him, paraded him on the back of a donkey in al-Fustat, and then threw him back into prison.

Khut remained governor until August 852, when he was dismissed and replaced with Anbasah ibn Ishaq al-Dabbi.

== Notes ==
Preceded by Ishaq ibn Yahya ibn Mu'adh	Governor of Egypt; 851–852	Succeeded by Anbasah ibn Ishaq al-Dabbi
