= Anbasah ibn Ishaq al-Dabbi =

Provincial Abbasid governor

- عنبسة بن إسحاق الضبي

Abbasid Governor of Sindh
- In office 840–840s
- Preceded by: Imran ibn Musa al-Barmaki
- Succeeded by: Harun ibn Abi Khalid al-Marwrudhi

Abbasid Governor of Egypt
- In office 852–856
- Preceded by: Khut Abd al-Wahid ibn Yahya
- Succeeded by: Yazid ibn Abdallah al-Hulwani

Personal details
- Died: 860 CE
- Parent: Ishaq (father)

Anbasah ibn Isḥāq al-Ḍabbi (Arabic: عنبسة بن إسحاق الضبي; died c. 860) was a provincial governor for the Abbasid Caliphate in the ninth century, serving as governor of Raqqa (833), al-Sind (c. 840s) and Egypt (852–856). He was the last Arab to hold the governorship of Egypt under the Abbasid caliphs, his successors thereafter being Turks.

== Governorship of al-Sind ==
The scion of an Arab family originating from al-Basrah, Anbasah was appointed to be resident governor of al-Sind for the Turkish officer Itakh, who had been granted the administration of the province by the caliph. At the time of his appointment, al-Sind was in a state of disorder, and its previous governor 'Imran ibn Musa al-Barmaki had been killed during infighting among the local Arabs. When Anbasah arrived in the province, however, most of the notables willingly submitted to him, and he was eventually able to pacify the region.

During his administration of al-Sind, Anbasah tore down the tower of a Buddhist stupa in Daybul and converted the stupa into a prison. He also took the stone from the demolition and began a project to rebuild Daybul, but he was dismissed from the governorship before the work was completed.

For the dates for Anbasah's governorship, the historians al-Ya'qubi and al-Baladhuri provide variant information. Al-Ya'qubi claims that he was appointed by Itakh during the caliphate of al-Wathiq (r. 842–847) and remained governor for nine years, before departing from his post and returning to Iraq following Itkah's downfall in 849. Al-Baladhuri, on the other hand, states that he was governor during the reign of al-Mu'tasim (r. 833–842).

== Governorship of Egypt ==
In 852 Anbasah was appointed as resident governor of Egypt, placing him in charge of security and the prayers and additionally giving him joint control over the taxes (kharaj), together with the local finance officer. The appointment was given to him by the Abbasid prince al-Muntasir, who had been assigned the province as part of al-Mutawakkil's (r. 847–861) succession arrangements.

While the governor of Egypt, Anbasah worked to reduce the abuses of the tax collectors and built a new musalla in Fustat, and the Egyptian historian al-Kindi regarded him as a just and devout administrator. He also was responsible for carrying out al-Mutawakkil's anti-dhimmi decrees, and additionally banned the public display of Christian symbols and the possession of wine.

In 853, the Byzantines launched a surprise attack against Damietta, destroying it and taking a large number of captives. The city had been undefended at the time, as Anbasah had summoned the local troops to Fustat to celebrate the Day of Arafah. In the aftermath of the raid, Anbasah received an order from al-Mutawakkil to build fortifications around Damietta to protect it from future attack, and construction was begun in the following year.

To the south, the Beja ceased paying the tribute that they customarily rendered to the Egyptian authorities and in 855 they began raiding the fringes of Muslim territory, causing several casualties. These activities prompted al-Mutawakkil to organize a punitive expedition, and Anbasah was instructed to provide all of his available troops for the campaign. Despite the difficult nature of the terrain, the Muslim army compelled the Beja to sue for peace, and their chieftain agreed to travel to Samarra and make a personal submission to the caliph.

In 855, Anbasah's administration over taxes was revoked, leaving him in charge of security and prayers alone. In the following year, he was dismissed from the governorship and replaced with Yazid ibn 'Abdallah al-Hulwani, a Turkish officer, and he returned to Iraq around the end of 858. Al-Kindi notes that Anbasah was the last Arab to serve as governor, as well as the last to lead the people in the Friday prayers; henceforth the governorship was given to Turks, eventually leading to the foundation of the Tulunid dynasty in 868.

== Notes ==
Preceded by Imran ibn Musa al-Barmaki	Governor of al-Sind c. 840s	Succeeded by Harun ibn Abi Khalid al-Marwrudhi
Preceded by Khut Abd al-Wahid ibn Yahya	Governor of Egypt; 852–856	Succeeded by Yazid ibn Abdallah al-Hulwani
