= Harthamah ibn al-Nadr al-Jabali =

Harthamah ibn al-Nadr (or al-Nasr) al-Jabali (Arabic: هرثمة بن النضر الجبلي) was a ninth century provincial governor for the Abbasid Caliphate, serving as governor of Egypt from 847 until his death in 849.

== Career ==
Harthamah may be identified with Harthamah ibn al-Nadr al-Khuttali, who was governor of al-Maraghah in 838. That same year, he became involved in the conspiracy to assassinate the caliph al-Mu'tasim (r. 833–842) and replace him with al-Abbas ibn al-Ma'mun. When the plot was discovered he was arrested and put in irons, but after al-Afshin interceded for him he was released and received the governorship of al-Dinawar instead.

In 847 Harthamah was appointed resident governor of Egypt by the Turkish general Itakh, and he arrived in the province in the following year. During his administration the caliph al-Mutawakkil (r. 847–861) began to bring an end to the mihnah and abandon the doctrine that the Qur'an had been created, and in accordance with this policy Harthamah was ordered to prohibit debate about the nature of the Qur'an in Egypt.

Harthamah remained governor until February 849, when he fell ill and died. Before dying, he designated his son Hatim as his successor, and the latter then took over the governorship.

== Notes ==
| Preceded by 'Isa ibn Mansur al-Rafi'i | Governor of Egypt; 847–849 | Succeeded by Hatim ibn Harthamah ibn al-Nadr |
