= Sa'id ibn Yazid ibn Alqama al-Azdi =

Governor of Egypt (682–684)

Governor of Egypt
- In office 682–684
- Monarchs: Yazid I, Muawiya II
- Preceded by: Maslama ibn Mukhallad al-Ansari
- Succeeded by: Abd al-Rahman ibn Utba al-Fihri

Personal details
- Parent: Yazid ibn Alqama al-Azdi (father)

Sa'id ibn Yazid ibn Alqama al-Azdi (Arabic: سعيد بن يزيد بن علقمة الأزدي) was the governor of Egypt for the Umayyad Caliphate in 682–684.

An Arab from Palestine, Sa'id ibn Yazid was appointed by Caliph Yazid I to succeed Maslama ibn Mukhallad al-Ansari in 682. Although he tried to present an image of continuity by keeping Maslama's sahib al-shurta (head of security and de facto deputy), 'Abis ibn Sa'id al-Muradi, the local Arab settler community (wujuh) were opposed to him as an outsider.

In 683, the Second Fitna broke out, and soon after Yazid I's death in November, Ibn al-Zubayr was acknowledged as Caliph at Mecca. Ibn al-Zubayr gained the support of the Kharijites in Egypt and sent a governor of his own, Abd al-Rahman ibn Utba al-Fihri, to the province. Sa'id ibn Yazid chose not to offer resistance and simply retired. The Kharijite-supported Zubayrid regime was even more unpopular with the wujuh, and lasted for less than a year before the wujuh leaders called upon the Umayyad Caliph Marwan I for aid, who reconquered the province in December 684.

== Sources ==
- Kennedy, Hugh (1998). "Egypt as a province in the Islamic caliphate, 641–868". In Petry, Carl F. (ed.). Cambridge History of Egypt, Volume One: Islamic Egypt, 640–1517. Cambridge: Cambridge University Press. pp. 62–85. ISBN 0-521-47137-0.

| Preceded by Muhammad ibn Maslama | Governor of Egypt; 682–684 | Succeeded by Abd al-Rahman ibn Utba al-Fihri |
