= Jabir ibn al-Ash'ath al-Ta'i =

Abbasid governor of Egypt

Jabir ibn al-Ash'ath ibn Yahya al-Ta'i جابر بن الأشعث بن يحيى

Abbasid Governor of Egypt
- In office 811–812
- Monarch: al-Amīn
- Preceded by: Hatim ibn Harthamah
- Succeeded by: Abbad ibn Muhammad

Personal details
- Parent: Al-Ash'ath (father)

Jabir ibn al-Ash'ath ibn Yahya al-Ta'i (Arabic: جابر بن الأشعث بن يحيى الطائي) was a governor of Egypt, from 811 to 812.

He was appointed in March 811 by the caliph al-Amin, replacing Hatim ibn Harthamah ibn A'yan. Soon afterwards however he was forced to contend with the outbreak of civil war between al-Amin and his brother al-Ma'mun, and before long his continued loyalty to the former had put him at odds with a faction of the local jund led by al-Sari ibn al-Hakam, which favored recognizing al-Ma'mun as caliph instead. In the spring of 812 the jund, with the encouragement of al-Ma'mun, openly switched their allegiance and revolted, and Jabir was overthrown from his position. A partisan of al-Ma'mun, Abbad ibn Muhammad ibn Hayyan, then assumed the governorship and took up power in Fustat, but other parts of Egypt continued to remain loyal to al-Amin under the anti-governor Rabi'ah ibn Qays ibn Zubayr al-Jurashi.

== Notes ==
Preceded by Hatim ibn Harthamah ibn A'yan	Governor of Egypt; 811–812	Succeeded by Abbad ibn Muhammad ibn Hayyan
