= Hatim ibn Harthamah ibn A'yan =

Hatim ibn Harthamah ibn A'yan (Arabic: حاتم بن هرثمة بن أعين) (died after 816) was a ninth-century provincial governor for the Abbasid Caliphate, serving in Egypt (810–811) and Arminiyah and Adharbayjan (816).

== Career ==
Hatim was the son of Harthama ibn A'yan, a high-ranking general during the caliphates of al-Hadi, Harun al-Rashid and al-Ma'mun. He is mentioned as having served as chief of security (shurtah) for his father during the latter's governorship of Egypt in 794–795, and was later himself appointed over that province by the caliph al-Amin in 810. During his year-long administration he brought an end to ongoing disturbances in the Hawf district by forming an agreement with its residents regarding issues of taxation, and defeated a separate revolt by the people of Tanu and Tumayy led by Uthman ibn al-Mustanir al-Judhami. He was also responsible for building the palace in the Muqattam hills known as the Qubbat al-Hawa ("Dome of the Winds"), which was used by all subsequent governors until its destruction in 905. His governorship lasted until March 811, when he was dismissed in favor of Jabir ibn al-Ash'ath al-Ta'i.

In 816 Hatim was appointed as governor of Arminiyah and Adharbayjan, but scarcely had he taken up his position when he learned that his father had been imprisoned and killed by al-Ma'mun. In response Hatim took steps to renounce his allegiance to the caliph and attempted to incite the local princes and notables to revolt, but his plans were cut short by his own death soon afterwards. The effects of his actions persisted after his death, however, and were a likely factor in the outbreak of the Khurramite rebellion of Babak, which occurred around the same time.

== Notes ==
Preceded by Al-Hasan ibn al-Takhtakh	Governor of Egypt; 810–811	Succeeded by Jabir ibn al-Ash'ath al-Ta'i
