= Hatim ibn Harthamah ibn al-Nadr =

Provincial governor for the Abbasid Caliphate

Hatim ibn Harthamah ibn al-Nadr (Arabic: حاتم بن هرثمة بن النضر) was a provincial governor for the Abbasid Caliphate.

Hatim was the son of Harthamah ibn al-Nadr al-Jabali, who was appointed governor of Egypt in 847. When Harthamah fell ill in 849, he appointed his son as his successor, and following Harthamah's death Hatim was confirmed as governor by the Turkish general Itakh. After holding the governorship for slightly over a month, however, Hatim was dismissed and replaced with 'Ali ibn Yahya al-Armani.

== Notes ==
Preceded by Harthamah ibn al-Nadr al-Jabali	Governor of Egypt; 849	Succeeded by 'Ali ibn Yahya al-Armani
