= Malik ibn al-Haytham al-Khuza'i =

8th-century Abbasid governor and military leader

Abu Nasr Malik ibn al-Haytham al-Khuza'i (Arabic: أبو نصر مالك بن الهيثم الخزاعي) was an early Abbasid follower and military leader.

== Biography ==
A Khurasani Arab from the Banu Khuza'a tribe, he was one of earliest followers of the Abbasid missionary effort (da'wa) in Khurasan, and eventually became one of the principal leaders ("the twelve naqaba'") of the—as yet secret—Abbasid movement. On the outbreak of the Abbasid Revolution in late 747, he was chosen by the Abbasid leaders as camp commander and head of the security force (shurta) under the main Abbasid commander, Abu Muslim, while his son Nasr was named as his deputy. In this capacity, Malik participated in the battles of the Abbasid Revolution in Khurasan and in the offensive westwards under Abu Muslim.

After the success of the Revolution, Malik became one of the closest adherents of Abu Muslim. After the suppression of the revolt of Abdallah ibn Ali against Caliph al-Mansur (r. 754–775) in Syria in 754, the long-simmering tension between Abu Muslim—who had come to rule Khurasan as a near-sovereign prince, practically independent of the Abbasid family—and al-Mansur came to the fore. Malik counselled Abu Muslim to return straight to Khurasan for his own safety, but Abu Muslim was loath to effect a complete breach and accepted the summons of the Caliph. During the subsequent audience, the Caliph had Abu Muslim executed. Following the murder of Abu Muslim, Malik was briefly arrested, but reconciled himself with the Abbasids and regained the Caliph's favour when he came to al-Mansur's aid during the Rawandiya uprising in 758/9. He was then rewarded with the governorship of Mosul, which he held from 759/60 until 763. He is not mentioned any more, and probably died at about the same time.

Nevertheless, his family remained among the most powerful in the Khurasaniyya, the Khurasani army that had borne the Abbasids to power and remained the main pillar of the early Abbasid regime, and his descendants through his sons Nasr, Hamza, Ja'far, Dawud and especially Abdallah continued to hold high military and administrative offices until well into the 9th century,

== Sources ==
- Crone, Patricia (1980). Slaves on Horses: The Evolution of the Islamic Polity. Cambridge: Cambridge University Press. ISBN 0-521-52940-9.
- Kennedy, Hugh N. (1986). The Early Abbasid Caliphate: A Political History. London and Sydney: Croom Helm. ISBN 0-7099-3115-8.
- Sharon, Moshe (1990). Revolt: the social and military aspects of the ʿAbbāsid revolution. Jerusalem: Graph Press Ltd. ISBN 965-223-388-9.
