= Abd al-Malik ibn Marwan ibn Musa =

Last Umayyad Governor of Egypt 750 CE

Abd al-Malik ibn Marwan ibn Musa ibn Nusayr عبد الملك بن مروان بن موسى بن نصير

Umayyad Governor of Egypt
- In office 750 – 750 (less than a year)
- Monarch: Marwan II
- Preceded by: Al-Mughirah ibn Ubaydallah al-Fazari
- Succeeded by: Salih ibn Ali (Abbasid governor)

Personal details
- Parent: Marwan ibn Musa ibn Nusayr
- Relatives: Musa ibn Nusayr (grandfather); Mu'awiyah ibn Marwan ibn Musa (brother)

Abd al-Malik ibn Marwan ibn Musa ibn Nusayr (Arabic: عبد الملك بن مروان بن موسى بن نصير) was the last governor of Egypt for the Umayyad Caliphate.

== Career ==
Abd al-Malik was a grandson of Musa ibn Nusayr, the Muslim general responsible for the conquest of parts of North Africa and Hispania. He first appears in c. 749 as the finance director for Egypt during the governorship of al-Mughirah ibn Ubaydallah al-Fazari. Following al-Mughirah's death in December 749, Abd al-Malik was selected to replace him by the Umayyad caliph Marwan II.

Abd al-Malik's governorship was a turbulent one, as it coincided with the arrival of the Abbasid Revolution in Egypt. In the Nile Delta, the Copts rebelled against the government and refused to pay the taxes that Abd al-Malik had levied on them, forcing the governor to send troops which engaged the insurgents in a bloody battle. Around the same time, an anti-Umayyad revolt broke out in the eastern Hawf district; Abd al-Malik dispatched another army to Bilbeis to deal with them, but on this occasion the two sides were able to agree to a reconciliation and refrained from fighting.

In the midst of these disturbances, Marwan II himself arrived in Egypt in June 750, having fled there from Syria in the aftermath of his defeat against the Abbasids at the Battle of the Zab earlier that year. Within a short time of his arrival he found much of the country was against him, with various rebels taking up the Abbasid black in the Hawf, Alexandria, Upper Egypt, and Aswan, and the Copts continuing to be in a state of revolt. Marwan eventually opted to depart from Fustat, destroying the Gilded Palace and city bridges as he did so, and sent his armies to retake Alexandria and Upper Egypt. Soon afterwards, however, an Abbasid force under Salih ibn Ali and Abu Awn Abd al-Malik ibn Yazid invaded Egypt and caught up with Marwan, killing him at Busir in August 750; with the death of the caliph, the province submitted to the Abbasids, and Umayyad rule was brought to an end.

In the aftermath of Marwan's death, Abd al-Malik and his brother Mu'awiyah were captured and imprisoned by Salih ibn Ali, but were soon pardoned on account of the leniency Abd al-Malik had shown towards the Abbasids during his time in office. They later accompanied Salih when he departed from Egypt in 751.

== Notes ==
Preceded by Al-Mughirah ibn Ubaydallah al-Fazari	Governor of Egypt; 750	Succeeded by Salih ibn Ali (Abbasid Governor)
