= Al-Layth ibn al-Fadl =

Provincial Abbasid governor

Al-Layth ibn al-Fadl الليث بن الفضل

Abbasid Governor of Egypt
- In office 798–803
- Monarch: Harun al-Rashīd
- Preceded by: Isma'il ibn Isa ibn Musa al-Hashimi
- Succeeded by: Ahmad ibn Isma'il ibn Ali al-Hashimi

Abbasid Governor of Sistan
- In office 815–819
- Monarch: al-Ma'mun
- Preceded by: Muhammad ibn al-Ash'ath al-Tarabi
- Succeeded by: A'yan ibn Harthamah ibn A'yan

Personal details
- Parent: al-Fadl (father)

Al-Layth ibn al-Fadl al-Abiwardi (Arabic: الليث بن الفضل الأبيوردي) was a provincial governor for the Abbasid Caliphate, serving in Egypt (798–803) and Sistan (815–819).

== Governorship of Egypt ==
Described as a mawla by the sources, al-Layth was appointed governor of Egypt in 798 by the caliph Harun al-Rashid (r. 786–809), with authority over both prayers and security (salah) and taxation (kharaj). During his five-year administration, he reportedly maintained good relations with the local Christians, but he was also known as a strict enforcer of tax collection. On two occasions, in 799 and 801, he left the province to deliver tax revenues and gifts to the caliph in person, leaving deputies in charge in his absence.

In 802 al-Layth was faced with a protest by the people of the Hawf district, who complained that the government surveyors were measuring cultivatable land using instruments calibrated at less than the standard length of the qasabah, resulting in land owners being overcharged on their tax burdens. When al-Layth ignored their grievances, the Hawfis rose up in revolt and marched on Fustat, forcing the governor to send out an army against them in response. In the resulting battle the Hawfis were defeated and forced to fall back, and eighty heads were forwarded on to Fustat for display.

Despite their defeat, the Hawfis persisted in their refusal to pay their taxes, and al-Layth eventually decided to make a visit to Harun al-Rashid in order to request reinforcements. At this point, however, one Mahfuz ibn Sulayman approached the caliph and claimed that he could raise the required tax revenue without the use of troops. In response, Harun dismissed al-Layth from office and appointed Mahfuz as financial director of the province, while Ahmad ibn Isma'il ibn Ali al-Hashimi was appointed as head of security.

== Governorship of Sistan ==
In 815 al-Layth was appointed as governor of Sistan by al-Ma'mun (r. 813–833). Upon his arrival to the province, however, he found himself facing serious opposition from both his predecessor Muhammad ibn al-Ash'ath al-Tarabi and the rebel Harb ibn Ubaydah, who had joined forces in order to contest his appointment. When al-Layth reached the provincial capital of Zaranj in December 815 he occupied it with 400 cavalrymen and purged the city of Harb's loyalists, but he soon realized that the rebels enjoyed a significant numerical advantage in the countryside. Al-Layth therefore decided to reach out to the Kharijite leader Hamzah ibn Adharak, and the two agreed to form an alliance against Harb and Ibn al-Ash'ath. Eventually the rebels were defeated in a decisive battle; Harb subsequently disappeared, while Ibn al-Ash'ath fled to Zaranj but was captured, mutilated and killed by al-Layth.

In the aftermath of the battle al-Layth encountered little further opposition to his rule, and over the next four years of his governorship Sistan was in a relatively quiet state. The Kharijites were treated with toleration and allowed to enter and leave Zaranj without interference, while the local ayyarun were reconciled with the government and treated with favor by al-Layth. As a result of the peaceful state of affairs, the province soon came to enjoy a period of economic prosperity, with construction activity and trades of estates experiencing a significant boom during al-Layth's administration.

In 819 the governor of Khurasan Ghassan ibn Abbad, who had jurisdiction over Sistan, decided to appoint A'yan ibn Harthamah ibn A'yan as his deputy in the province. In order to forestall the possibility that al-Layth might challenge his appointment, A'yan dispatched a deputy to enter Zaranj in secret and attempt to seize the governor by force. Although the attempt was unsuccessful, al-Layth decided to recognize A'yan as his successor and stepped down from his position, and afterwards retired from Zaranj for one of his country estates.

== Notes ==
Preceded by Isma'il ibn Isa ibn Musa al-Hashimi	Governor of Egypt; 798–803	Succeeded by Ahmad ibn Isma'il ibn Ali al-Hashimi
Preceded by Muhammad ibn al-Ash'ath al-Tarabi	Governor of Sistan; 815–819	Succeeded by A'yan ibn Harthamah ibn A'yan
