= Aliyah bint al-Mansur =

Abbasid princess and sister of al-Mahdi

Aliyah bint al-Mansur علية بنت المنصور
- Born: 770s Baghdad, Abbasid Caliphate
- Died: Baghdad, Abbasid Caliphate
- Spouse: Ishaq ibn Sulayman
- Children: Al-Fadl, Ja'far
Names
- Aliyah bint Abdallah al-Mansur
- House: Abbasid
- Father: al-Mansur
- Mother: Aliyah al-Umayya
- Religion: Islam

Aliyah bint al-Mansur (Arabic: علية بنت المنصور) was the 8th century Abbasid princess, only daughter of second Abbasid caliph al-Mansur and half-sister of third Abbasid caliph al-Mahdi. Aliyah was the only Abbasid princess in the Caliphate's history who had relation by birth with both Caliphal dynasties; cadet branch of Umayyads and ruling dynasty of Abbasids.

== Life ==
Aliyah was the daughter of al-Mansur. She was Al-Masnur's only daughter. She was born to an Umayyad woman named Aliyah al-Umayya. Her mother belonged to junior cadet branch of Umayyads (non ruling branch). She was named after her mother by his parents. Aliyah was the youngest child of al-Mansur. She was very young when her father died. Her elder half-brothers took care of her.

Her husband, Ishaq was a member of a collateral branch of the Abbasid dynasty, being a first cousin of the first two Abbasid caliphs al-Saffah (r. 750–754) and al-Mansur (r. 754–775). He was also connected to the ruling line by his marriage to Aliyah bint al-Mansur. Due to his close relation with caliphs, her husband and children remained important officials of Caliphate.

Aliyah was contemporary to several Abbasid caliphs; her brother al-Mahdi, her two nephews Musa al-Hadi and Harun al-Rashid.

== Siblings ==
Aliyah was related to Abbasid house both by birth and through marriage like most other Abbasid princess. She was contemporary and related to several Abbasid caliphs, princes and princesses.

No.	Abbasids	Relation
1	Al-Mahdi	Elder Half-brother
2	Ja'far	Elder Half-brother
3	Sulayman	Half-brother
4	Isa bint al-Mansur	Half-brother
5	Ya'qub	Half-brother
6	Ja'far	Half-brother
7	Salih al-Miskin	Younger Half-brother
8	Qasim	Younger Half-brother
