= Isma'il ibn Salih ibn Ali al-Hashimi =

8th-century Abbasid provincial governor

Isma'il ibn Salih ibn Ali al-Hashimi إسماعيل بن صالح بن علي الهاشمي

Governor of Egypt
- In office 797 – 798 (one year)
- Monarch: Harun al-Rashīd
- Preceded by: Ubaydallah ibn al-Mahdi
- Succeeded by: Isma'il ibn Isa ibn Musa al-Hashimi

Governor of Aleppo and Qinnasrin
- In office 798 – c. 802
- Monarch: Harun al-Rashīd

Personal details
- Relations: Abbasid dynasty
- Parent: Salih ibn Ali (father)
- Relatives: Al-Fadl ibn Salih (brother); Ibrahim ibn Salih (brother); Abd al-Malik ibn Salih (brother)

Ismāʿīl ibn Ṣāliḥ ibn ʿAlī al-Hāshimī (Arabic: إسماعيل بن صالح بن علي الهاشمي) was an eighth century Abbasid governor of Egypt and Aleppo.

A member of the Abbasid family, he was a son of Salih ibn Ali and a first cousin of the first two Abbasid caliphs al-Saffah (r. 750–754) and al-Mansur (r. 754–775). During the reign of Harun al-Rashid (r. 786–809) he was appointed as governor of Egypt in 797. After an administration lasting slightly less than a year, he was dismissed from that province and instead posted to Aleppo and Qinnasrin, which he proceeded to hold for an unspecified length of time.

== Notes ==
Preceded by Ubaydallah ibn al-Mahdi	Governor of Egypt; 797–798	Succeeded by Isma'il ibn Isa ibn Musa al-Hashimi
