= Abd al-Rahman ibn Utba al-Fihri =

Governor of Egypt in 684

Governor of Egypt
- In office 684 – 684 (less than a year)
- Preceded by: Sa'id ibn Yazid ibn Alqama al-Azdi
- Succeeded by: Abd al-Aziz ibn Marwan

Personal details
- Parent: Utba al-Fihri (father)

Abd al-Rahman ibn Utba al-Fihri, also known as Ibn Jahdam, was the governor of Egypt on behalf of the rival caliph Ibn al-Zubayr in 684, during the Second Fitna.

Egypt's Kharijites proclaimed their support for Ibn al-Zubayr when he proclaimed himself Caliph in Mecca. Ibn al-Zubayr dispatched Abd al-Rahman ibn Utba al-Fihri to Egypt to become the province's governor. Although the incumbent governor, Sa'id ibn Yazid, gave way, the resident Arab elites of the province barely tolerated his presence, and began contacts with the Umayyad caliph Marwan I in Damascus. These contacts encouraged Marwan to march against Egypt, where Abd al-Rahman vainly tried to muster a defence. Although he fortified the capital, Fustat, an army he sent to stop the Umayyad advance at Ayla melted away and his fleet was wrecked by storms. Marwan entered Egypt unopposed, and after a couple of days of clashes before Fustat, the city's elite surrendered it to him. Abd al-Rahman was allowed to leave Egypt with his possessions.

== Sources ==
- Kennedy, Hugh (1998). "Egypt as a province in the Islamic caliphate, 641–868". In Petry, Carl F. (ed.). Cambridge History of Egypt, Volume One: Islamic Egypt, 640–1517. Cambridge: Cambridge University Press. pp. 62–85. ISBN 0-521-47137-0.

Preceded by Sa'id ibn Yazid	Governor of Egypt; 684	Succeeded by Abd al-Aziz ibn Marwan
