= Al-Mughirah ibn Ubaydallah al-Fazari =

Umayyad Governor of Egypt 749 CE

Al-Mughirah ibn Ubaydallah al-Fazari المغيرة بن عبيد الله الفزاري

Umayyad Governor of Egypt
- In office 749 – 749 (ten months)
- Monarch: Marwan II
- Preceded by: Hawthara ibn Suhayl
- Succeeded by: al-Walid ibn al-Mughirah then Abd al-Malik ibn Marwan ibn Musa ibn Nusayr

Personal details
- Children: Abdallah, al-Walid
- Parent: Ubaydallah

Al-Mughira ibn Ubaydallah ibn al-Mughira ibn Abd Allah ibn Mas'ada al-Fazari (Arabic: المغيرة بن عبيد الله بن المغيرة بن عبد الله بن مسعدة الفزاري) (died December 27, 749) was a governor of Egypt for the Umayyad Caliphate for a portion of 749.

A member of the Banu Fazara, al-Mughira is described by al-Kindi as being a descendant of Abd Allah ibn Mas'ada al-Fazari. Appointed to Egypt by the caliph Marwan II, he arrived in the province in March 749 and designated his son Abdallah as his chief of security (shurta). After spending some time in Alexandria, both al-Mughira and Abdallah suddenly died, bringing an end to al-Mughira's governorship after just ten months. Another of his sons, al-Walid, then temporarily assumed control of affairs in the province, but was soon replaced by Marwan's new governor Abd al-Malik ibn Marwan.

== Notes ==
Preceded by Hawtharah ibn Suhayl	Governor of Egypt; 749	Succeeded by Abd al-Malik ibn Marwan ibn Musa ibn Nusayr
