= Al-Fadl ibn Salih =

Abbasid provincial governor (740–789)

Al-Fadl ibn Salih الفضل بن صالح

Abbasid governor of Syria
- In office 766–775
- Monarch: al-Mahdi
- Preceded by: Abd al-Wahhab ibn Ibrahim ibn Muhammad al-Abbasi (754–764)
- Succeeded by: Harun ibn al-Mahdi

Abbasid governor of al-Jazira
- In office 775–780
- Monarch: al-Mahdi
- Succeeded by: Abd al-Samad ibn Ali

Abbasid governor of Egypt
- In office 785–786
- Monarch: al-Hadi
- Preceded by: Assamah ibn Amr
- Succeeded by: Ali ibn Sulayman

Personal details
- Born: 740
- Died: 789
- Parent: Salih ibn Ali (father)
- Relatives: Ibrahim, (brother); Isma'il, (brother); Abd al-Malik (brother)

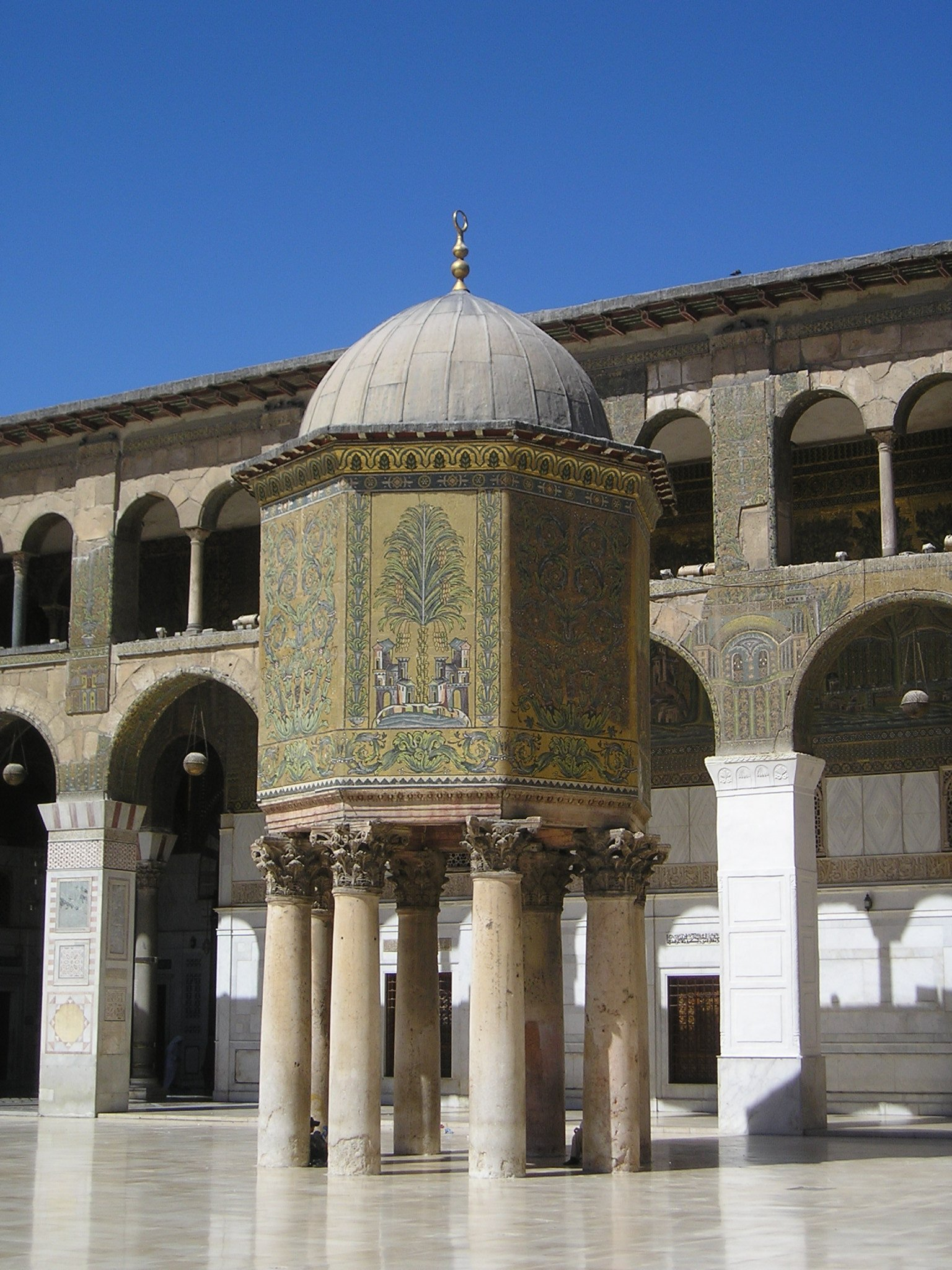
The Bayt al-Mal treasury dome was built under Fadl ibn Salih's orders in 789

Al-Faḍl ibn Ṣāliḥ ibn ʿAlī ibn ʿAbd Allāh ibn al-ʿAbbās (Arabic: الفضل بن صالح بن علي بن عبد الله العباسي) (740–789) was the Abbasid governor of a number of different provinces in Syria during the late 8th-century CE. He was also governor of Egypt for a brief period of time. He was related to the Abbasid caliphs and was part of the Banu Salih branch of the Abbasid dynasty.

== Career ==
In 755, al-Fadl led the pilgrim caravan destined for Mecca and Medina for the annual hajj. He became governor of Jund Dimashq (whose principal city was Damascus) in 766 and three years later he added Jund Qinnasrin (whose principal city was Aleppo) to his domain during the reign of the caliph al-Mansur. In 775, he was appointed governor of the region of al-Jazira north of Damascus by the Abbasid caliph al-Mahdi. He moved to al-Jazira the same year. Al-Fadl returned to Damascus following his trip to Jerusalem in 780 where he accompanied al-Mahdi as part of his entourage. It was around this time when he was deposed as governor of al-Jazira and replaced by Abd al-Samad ibn Ali.

Al-Fadl was sent along with a large army to quell a rebellion in Egypt in 785. After defeating the rebels at Buwit, al-Mahdi appointed him governor of al-Fustat in Egypt. He established the soldiers' barracks and the congregational mosque of al-Askar and during his tenure the cities of al-Askar and al-Fustat merged into one large city. His governance only lasted one year and when al-Hadi succeeded his father to the Caliphate in 786, he was relieved from his position. Upon his return to Syria in 789, he had the doors of the Umayyad Mosque replaced and built the famed Bayt al-Mal treasury dome to house the mosque's funds. Al-Fadl was also responsible for the construction of the eastern Dome of the Clock, which was built in 780.

== Bibliography ==
- Cobb, Paul M. (2001). White banners: contention in ʻAbbāsid Syria, 750-880. SUNY Press. ISBN 0-7914-4880-0.
- Petry, Carl F. (2008). The Cambridge History of Egypt. Cambridge University Press. ISBN 978-0-521-06885-7.
- Meyers, Eric M.; American Schools of Oriental Research (1997). The Oxford encyclopedia of archaeology in the Near East. Vol. 1. Oxford University Press. ISBN 0-19-506512-3.
- Rappoport, S. (2003). History of Egypt. Kessinger Publishing. ISBN 0-7661-3456-3.
- Rudolff, Britta (2006). "Intangible and Tangible Heritage" (PDF). University of Mainz. Archived from the original (PDF) on 2011-07-18.
- Tabari, Abu Ja'far (1989). Carole Hillenbrand (ed.). The waning of the Umayyad caliphate. SUNY Press. ISBN 0-88706-810-3.
- Tabari, Abu Ja'far (1990). Hugh N. Kennedy (ed.). Al-Manṣūr and Al-Mahdī. SUNY Press. ISBN 0-7914-0143-X.

Preceded by Assamah ibn Amr al-Ma'afiri	Governor of Egypt; 785–786	Succeeded by Ali ibn Sulayman ibn Ali al-Hashimi
