= Abdallah ibn al-Musayyab al-Dabbi =

Abbasid governor of Egypt from 792 to 793

Abdallah ibn al-Musayyab ibn Zuhayr al-Dabbi

Governor of Egypt
- In office 792–793
- Monarch: Harun al-Rashid
- Deputy: to Abd al-Malik ibn Salih
- Preceded by: Ibrahim ibn Salih
- Succeeded by: Ishaq ibn Sulayman

Deputy Governor of Egypt
- In office 795 – 795 (Less than a year)
- Monarch: Harun al-Rashid
- Preceded by: Abd al-Malik ibn Salih
- Succeeded by: Ubaydallah ibn al-Mahdi

Personal details
- Parent: Al-Musayyab ibn Zuhayr al-Dabbi (father)

Abdallah ibn al-Musayyab ibn Zuhayr al-Dabbi (Arabic: عبد الله بن المسيب بن زهير الضبي) was a governor of Egypt for the Abbasid Caliphate, from 792 to 793.

== Career ==
He was a son of al-Musayyab ibn Zuhayr, a participant of the Abbasid Revolution who later served as a provincial governor and security chief. In 792 he was appointed as governor (wali) of Egypt by the caliph Harun al-Rashid, as a replacement for the deceased Ibrahim ibn Salih. During his governorship he is reported to have been engaged in hostilities with the people of the Hawf district, and to have received a request from the emir of Córdoba Hashim I for reinforcements in support of his raids against the Franks. After remaining in office for a little under a year, he was dismissed and replaced with Ishaq ibn Sulayman al-Hashimi.

In 795 Abdallah was again put in charge of affairs in Egypt, this time as resident deputy (khalifah) for the absentee governor Abd al-Malik ibn Salih, and he stayed in that position until Abd al-Malik's successor Ubaydallah ibn al-Mahdi arrived to replace him in the middle of that year.

According to Ibn Qutaybah, he was also a governor of Fars and the Jazirah.

== Notes ==
Preceded by Ibrahim ibn Salih ibn Abdallah ibn al-Abbas	Governor of Egypt; 792–793	Succeeded by Ishaq ibn Sulayman al-Hashimi
