= Muttalib ibn Abdallah ibn Malik =

9th-century provincial Abbasid governor

Muttalib ibn Abdallah ibn Malik al-Khuza'i مطلب بن عبدالله بن مالك الخزاعي

Abbasid Governor of Egypt (First term)
- In office 813–814
- Monarch: al-Ma'mun
- Preceded by: Abbad ibn Muhammad
- Succeeded by: al-Abbas ibn Musa

Abbasid Governor of Egypt (Second term)
- In office 814–816
- Monarch: al-Mamun
- Preceded by: al-Abbas ibn Musa
- Succeeded by: al-Sari ibn al-Hakam

Personal details
- Born: Abbasid Caliphate
- Parent: Abdallah ibn Malik al-Khuza'i (father)

Muttalib ibn Abdallah ibn Malik al-Khuza'i (Arabic: مطلب بن عبدالله بن مالك الخزاعي) was a son of the Abbasid general and administrator Abdallah ibn Malik al-Khuza'i. During the civil war between al-Amin and al-Ma'mun, he sided with the latter.

In 811, he administered the oath of allegiance (bay'ah) to al-Ma'mun for Mosul, and was named governor of Egypt briefly in 813 and again from 814 to 816. In 817, however, after al-Ma'mun chose the Alid Ali al-Rida as his heir, Muttalib joined the uprising in Baghdad against al-Ma'mun, and even administered the oath to the city's rival Caliph, Ibrahim ibn al-Mahdi.

== Sources ==
- Crone, Patricia (1980). Slaves on Horses: The Evolution of the Islamic Polity (1980 ed.). Cambridge: Cambridge University Press. pp. 181–182. ISBN 978-0521229616.

Preceded by Abbad ibn Muhammad ibn Hayyan	Governor of Egypt; 813–814	Succeeded by Al-Abbas ibn Musa ibn Isa al-Hashimi
Preceded by Al-Abbas ibn Musa ibn Isa al-Hashimi	Governor of Egypt; 814–816	Succeeded by Al-Sari ibn al-Hakam
