= Muhammad ibn Abdawayh ibn Jabalah =

Muhammad ibn Abdawayh ibn Jabalah al-Anbari (Arabic: محمد بن عبدويه بن جبلة) was a ninth-century official for the Abbasid Caliphate. During his lifetime he served as the governor of Barqah and Hims.

== Career ==
Muhammad was the son of Abdawayh ibn Jabalah, a military officer and governor of Egypt during the caliphate of al-Ma'mun (r. 813–833). He himself embarked on a similar career, and early in the reign of al-Wathiq (r. 842–847) he is mentioned as serving as governor of Barqah in North Africa. During his administration of that province he was faced with an uprising by a group of Berbers and tribal Arabs, which remained unsubdued until al-Wathiq dispatched the army commander Raja ibn Ayyub al-Hidari to pacify the region.

In 854 Muhammad was appointed as governor of Hims after the previous head official Abu al-Mughith Musa ibn Ibrahim was forced out by the inhabitants. In the following year he was faced with a large uprising by the city's inhabitants, which he however defeated with the help of reinforcements from Damascus and Ramla. As a consequence of the revolt he was ordered by the caliph al-Mutawakkil to undertake a number of punitive measures against the city residents, including the execution of a number of local leaders and the expulsion of the entire Christian population from Hims. Al-Mutawakkil subsequently awarded him with 50,000 dirhams, as well as gifts and robes of honor, for his conduct during the event.
