= Abbad ibn Muhammad ibn Hayyan =

Governor of Egypt for the Abbasid Caliphate

Abbad ibn Muhammad ibn Hayyan al-Balkhi (Arabic: عباد بن محمد بن حيان البلخي) was a governor of Egypt for the Abbasid Caliphate, from 812 to 813.

== Career ==
A mawla of the tribe of Kindah, Abbad was initially an administrator (wakil) of the Egyptian estates belonging to the general Harthamah ibn A'yan. After the breakout of the fourth civil war in 811 he encouraged the Egyptian people to cast off their loyalty to the caliph al-Amin and support his rival al-Ma'mun instead, and when al-Amin's governor Jabir ibn al-Ash'ath al-Ta'i was overthrown by an army coup in early 812 he took his place and formally gave the oath of allegiance to al-Ma'mun. He soon however found himself faced with serious opposition from the Qays of the Hawf region, whose leader Rabi'ah ibn Qays ibn Zubayr al-Jurashi had been induced by al-Amin to take up arms on his behalf, and over the course of the following months his forces suffered several losses and were compelled to defend Fustat from repeated attacks. Fighting continued until the two sides learned of al-Amin's death in September 813, and shortly afterwards Abbad was replaced with al-Muttalib ibn Abdallah al-Khuza'i.

Following his dismissal Abbad remained in Egypt, and he occasionally continued to be active on the political scene in the succeeding years.

== Notes ==
Preceded by Jabir ibn al-Ash'ath al-Ta'i	Governor of Egypt; 812–813	Succeeded by Al-Muttalib ibn Abdallah al-Khuza'i
