= Abdallah ibn Malik al-Khuza'i =

Abbasid military leader and governor (8th to 9th-century)

Abdallah ibn Malik al-Khuza'i (Arabic: عبد الله بن مالك الخزاعي) was Arab senior military leader and provincial governor of the early Abbasid Caliphate.

== Biography ==
Abdallah's father, Malik ibn al-Haytham al-Khuza'i, was one of the earliest and most important leaders of the Abbasid movement in Khurasan, and of the Abbasid Revolution that overthrew the Umayyads. As senior members of the privileged Khurasaniyya, the Khurasani army that formed the main pillar of the new regime, Malik's family enjoyed access to positions of power. Thus Abdallah served first, according to Khalifa ibn Khayyat, as governor of Khurasan under Caliph al-Mansur (r. 754–775), and then succeeded his brother Hamza (who in turn had succeeded the eldest brother Nasr) as commander of the caliphal shurta towards the end of the reign of al-Mahdi (r. 775–785). He retained the post under al-Hadi (r. 785–786), during whose reign he was "one of the most prominent figures" (Hugh N. Kennedy). During this period, he supported al-Hadi in his intention to remove his younger brother, Harun al-Rashid (r. 786–809), from the succession in favour of his own son, and urged al-Hadi to execute Yahya ibn Khalid ibn Barmak.

Consequently, Abdallah's power diminished when Harun rose to the throne and during the period of the Barmakids' dominance of the government, although he served as governor of Mosul in 789–791. After the fall of the Barmakid family in early 803, Abdallah once again assumed high offices: he served as commander of Harun's shurta, and in 805 became governor of Tabaristan, Hamadan, and other western Iranian provinces. He participated in Harun's large-scale invasion of Byzantine Asia Minor in 806. In the next year, he fought against the Khurramites, and in 808 he accompanied Harun to Khurasan for the suppression of the rebellion of Rafi ibn al-Layth.

After Harun's death in Khurasan in early 809, Abdallah remained in the province, joining the court of Harun's second heir, al-Ma'mun (r. 813–833), at Marw. In the subsequent civil war between al-Ma'mun and his half-brother, Caliph al-Amin (r. 809–813), he remained largely on the sidelines at Marw. He was one of several military leaders who refused to head al-Ma'mun's government, a post which eventually fell to Fadl ibn Sahl. His relations with al-Ma'mun were strained, but he accompanied him westwards and was with him when he entered Baghdad in 819.

Abdallah had two sons, Abbas and Muttalib. Abbas served governor of Rayy but was dismissed by al-Ma'mun because of his support for al-Amin, while Muttalib played a "very tortuous role" (Kennedy) in the civil war and served twice as governor of Egypt.

== Sources ==
- Crone, Patricia (1980). Slaves on Horses: The Evolution of the Islamic Polity. Cambridge: Cambridge University Press. ISBN 0-521-52940-9.
- Kennedy, Hugh N. (1986). The Early Abbasid Caliphate: A Political History. London and Sydney: Croom Helm. ISBN 0-7099-3115-8.
