= Abdallah ibn Muhammad ibn Ibrahim al-Zaynabi =

Provincial Abbasid governor

Abdallah ibn Muhammad ibn Ibrahim al-Zaynabi عبد الله بن محمد بن إبراهيم الزينبي

Governor of Yemen
- In office 785–786
- Monarchs: al-Mahdi, al-Hadi
- Preceded by: Sulayman ibn Yazid al-Harithi
- Succeeded by: Ibrahim ibn Salm ibn Qutaybah al-Bahili or al-Ghitrif ibn al-Ata

Governor of Medina and Mecca
- Monarchs: Harun al-Rashid (under, Harun he was once or twice governor of Mecca)

Governor of Egypt
- In office 805–806
- Monarch: Harun al-Rashid
- Preceded by: Ahmad ibn Isma'il ibn Ali
- Succeeded by: Al-Husayn ibn Jamil

Personal details
- Relations: Abbasid dynasty
- Parents: Muhammad ibn Ibrahim al-Hashimi (father); Zaynab bint Sulayman ibn Ali (mother)
- Known for: Leading the funeral prayers of famous Muslim theologian Malik ibn Anas in 795

Abdallah ibn Muhammad ibn Ibrahim al-Zaynabi (Arabic: عبد الله بن محمد بن إبراهيم الزينبي) was a minor Abbasid prince. He served as the governor of several provinces, including the Yemen and Egypt, in the late eighth and early ninth centuries.

== Life ==
A member of the Abbasid dynasty, Abdallah was the descendant of notable personages on both sides of his family. His father Muhammad was a son of Ibrahim ibn Muhammad ibn Ali, who had been a leading figure in the early stages of the Abbasid Revolution before being killed by the last Umayyad caliph Marwan II in 749. His mother, Zaynab, was the daughter of Sulayman ibn Ali and a senior princess at the Abbasid court, and Abdallah himself was usually known by the names of "al-Zaynabi" or "Abdallah ibn Zaynab." He was a second cousin of the fourth and fifth Abbasid caliphs al-Hadi (r. 785–786) and Harun al-Rashid (r. 786–809).

During his career Abdallah was appointed to several provincial governorships. Either during the caliphate of al-Hadi or al-Mahdi he was made governor of the Yemen, and under Harun al-Rashid he was once or twice governor of Mecca (and possibly Medina). In 805 he was appointed over Egypt, in which position he remained for approximately a year.

Abdallah was also known for leading the prayers at the funeral of Malik ibn Anas in 795.

== Notes ==
Preceded by Sulayman ibn Yazid al-Harithi	Abbasid governor of the Yemen c. 785	Succeeded by Ibrahim ibn Salm ibn Qutaybah al-Bahili; OR; Al-Ghitrif ibn al-Ata
Preceded by Ahmad ibn Isma'il ibn Ali al-Hashimi	Governor of Egypt; 805–806	Succeeded by Al-Husayn ibn Jamil
