= Abdawayh ibn Jabalah =

Abdawayh ibn Jabalah عبدويه بن جبلة

Abbasid Governor of Egypt
- In office 830–831
- Preceded by: Isa ibn Yazid al-Juludi
- Succeeded by: Isa ibn Mansur al-Rafi'i

Personal details
- Died: Abbasid Empire
- Children: Muhammad ibn Abdawayh
- Parent: Jabalah (father)

Abdawayh ibn Jabalah (Arabic: عبدويه بن جبلة) was a ninth-century governor of Egypt for the Abbasid Caliphate.

Abdawayh was a member of the abna', a group descended from the Khurasani troops who had helped bring the Abbasid dynasty to power and which formed the mainstay of the army in the late eighth and early ninth centuries. In 826 or 827 he became the chief of security (shurtah) in Egypt for the governor Abdallah ibn Tahir, in place of Abdallah's first chief Mu'adh ibn Aziz.

At the end of February 830, Abdawayh was appointed resident governor of Egypt by Abu Ishaq (the future caliph al-Mu'tasim, r. 833–842) in the aftermath of Abu Ishaq's campaign to put down a rebellion in the province. Abdawayh himself was soon forced to deal with an uprising in the Hawf district in Lower Egypt, but his forces fought against the rebels in the autumn of the year and eventually defeated them. He remained governor until February 831, when he was dismissed and replaced by 'Isa ibn Mansur al-Rafi'i.

Abdawayh was also the father of Muhammad ibn Abdawayh ibn Jabalah, who later served as governor of Barqah and Hims.

== Notes ==
Preceded by Isa ibn Yazid al-Juludi	Governor of Egypt; 830–831	Succeeded by Isa ibn Mansur al-Rafi'i
