= Salim ibn Sawadah al-Tamimi =

Abbasid governor of Egypt (780–781)

Governor of Egypt
- In office 780–781
- Preceded by: Yahya ibn Sa'id al-Harashi
- Succeeded by: Ibrahim ibn Salih

Salim ibn Sawadah al-Tamimi (Arabic: سالم بن سوادة التميمي) was a governor of Egypt for the Abbasid Caliphate, from 780 to 781.

He was appointed by the caliph al-Mahdi in late 780 with jurisdiction over military affairs, while a separate official was selected to handle matters of taxation. The historian Ibn Taghribirdi mentions that during his governorship both Egypt and the Maghreb suffered from a series of violent conflicts, and that Egyptian troops were briefly sent to assist Barqa but were later withdrawn without engaging in any fighting. He remained as governor until mid-781, when he was dismissed and replaced with Ibrahim ibn Salih.

== Notes ==
Preceded by Yahya ibn Dawud al-Kharsi	Governor of Egypt; 780–781	Succeeded by Ibrahim ibn Salih
