= Mu'adh ibn Muslim =

8th-century Abbasid general and governor

Mu'adh ibn Muslim معاذ بن مسلم

Governor of Khorasan
- In office 778–780
- Monarch: al-Mahdi

Personal details
- Died: after 786 Abbasid Caliphate
- Children: Husayn ibn Mu'adh, Yahya ibn Mu'adh
- Parent: Muslim ibn Mu'adh (father)
- Military career
- Allegiance: Abbasid Caliphate
- Branch: Abbasid Army
- Rank: General

Mu'adh ibn Muslim ibn Mu'adh (Arabic: معاذ بن مسلم بن معاذ) was a general and governor for the Abbasid Caliphate.

He was a Persian from Khuttal or Rayy, who converted and became a mawla of the Banu Dhuhl tribe. He participated in the Abbasid Revolution in 737/738, and was a partisan of Abu Muslim. In 766, he was among the army of Marw al-Rudh which was defeated by the rebel al-Muqanna. He served as governor of Khurasan in 778–780, and fought against the Alids in 785/786. He probably died shortly after.

He was closely connected to the Abbasid family, and his family continued to enjoy high office: one of his sons, Husayn, was a foster-brother of Caliph al-Hadi, while another son, Yahya, served as governor of Syria and Armenia.

== Sources ==
- Agha, Salih Sa'id (2003). The Revolution which Toppled the Umayyads: Neither Arab Nor ʻAbbāsid. Leiden: BRILL. p. 360. ISBN 90-04-12994-4.
- Crone, Patricia (1980). Slaves on Horses: The Evolution of the Islamic Polity (1980 ed.). Cambridge: Cambridge University Press. pp. 183–184. ISBN 978-0521229616.
