= List of rulers of Medieval Egypt =

This is a list of monarchs who ruled Egypt in the Middle Ages (640–1517). Egypt was ruled by Arab dynasties between 640 and 868. Between 868 and 1517, Egypt shifted towards local military rule, with Cairo serving as the capital since its founding in 973. Below is the list of rulers of medieval Egypt.

== Emirs under Rashidun Caliphate (640–661) ==
#	Name	Start	End	Period	Caliph	Notes
1	Amr ibn al-As	640	646	6 years	Umar Uthman	Lead the Arab conquest of Egypt Founded the capital of Al-Fustat
2	Abdallah ibn Sa'ad	646	656	10 years	Uthman	Overthrown by Muhammad ibn Abi Hudhayfa
3	Muhammad ibn Abi Hudhayfa	656	657	1 year	Uthman Ali	Killed
4	Qays ibn Sa'd	657	657	6 months	Ali	Secluded
5	Malik al-Ashtar	657	657	1 day	Ali	Died before reaching Al-Fustat
6	Muhammad ibn Abi Bakr	658	658	5 months	Ali	Killed
-	Amr ibn al-As	July 658	January 664	6 years	None (see First Fitna)	Seized Egypt after the death of Muhammad ibn Abi Bakr during First Fitna. Died in office

== Walis under Umayyad Caliphate (661–750) ==
Dates taken from John Stewart's African States and Rulers (2005).

#	Name	Start	End	Period	Caliph	Notes
1	Amr ibn al-As	661	January 664	3 years	Mu'awiya-Amr's arrangement	As per his agreement with Mu'awiya, Amr became ruler of Egypt for life and ruled as a virtual partner rather than a subordinate of Mu'awiya, who had become caliph after Ali's assassination and his son al-Hasan's abdication in 661. Died in office
2	Abd Allah ibn Amr	January 664	February 664	1 month	Muawiya I	Resigned
3	Utba ibn Abi Sufyan	February 664	665		Muawiya I	Brother of Mu'awiya I. Died in office.
4	Uqba ibn Amir	665	20 May 667	2 years	Muawiya I	Muleteer of Muhammad. Unseated
5	Maslama ibn Mukhallad al-Ansari	20 May 667	9 April 682	15 years	Muawiya I Yazid I	Leading Umayyad partisan in Egypt. Died in office
6	Muhammad ibn Maslama	9 April 682	14 May 682	1 month	Yazid I	-
7	Sa'id ibn Yazid ibn Alqama al-Azdi	14 May 682	April 684	2 years	Yazid I Muawiya II	Unseated
8	Abd al-Rahman ibn Utba al-Fihri	April 684	11 February 685	10 months	Muawiya II; Abd al-Malik	Appointed by Ibn al-Zubayr
9	Abd al-Aziz ibn Marwan	11 February 685	1 July 703	18 years	Abd al-Malik	Died in office
10	Abdallah ibn Abd al-Malik	1 July 703	30 January 709	6 years	Abd al-Malik; Al-Walid I	Unseated
11	Qurra ibn Sharik al-Absi	30 January 709	14 November 714	6 years	Al-Walid I	Died in office
12	Abd al-Malik ibn Rifa'a al-Fahmi	14 November 714	November 717	3 years	Al-Walid I Sulayman; Umar II	Unseated
13	Ayyub ibn Sharhabil	November 717	1 April 720	2.5 years	Umar II; Yazid II	-
14	Bishr ibn Safwan al-Kalbi	1 April 720	May 721	1 year	Yazid II	Became the governor of Ifriqiya
15	Handhala ibn Safwan al-Kalbi	May 721	724	3 years	Yazid II; Hisham	Unseated
16	Muhammad ibn Abd al-Malik ibn Marwan	724	2 May 724	1 year	Hisham	Resigned after witnessing an epidemic
17	Al-Hurr ibn Yusuf	2 May 724	27 April 727	3 years	Hisham	Unseated. Egypt under the de facto rule of Ubayd Allah ibn al-Habhab.
18	Hafs ibn al-Walid ibn Yusuf al-Hadrami	27 April 727	16 May 727	1.5 months	Hisham	Unseated. Egypt under the de facto rule of Ubayd Allah ibn al-Habhab.
(12)	Abd al-Malik ibn Rifa'a al-Fahmi	16 May 727	30 May 727	1 year	Hisham	Died in office. Egypt under the de facto rule of Ubayd Allah ibn al-Habhab.
19	Al-Walid ibn Rifa'a al-Fahmi	30 May 727	July 735	8 years	Hisham	Died in office. Egypt under the de facto rule of Ubayd Allah ibn al-Habhab.
20	Abd al-Rahman ibn Khalid al-Fahmi	July 735	12 January 737	1.5 years	Hisham	Unseated
(15)	Handhala ibn Safwan al-Kalbi	12 January 737	2 July 742	5.5 years	Hisham	Became the Wali of Africa
21	Hafs ibn al-Walid ibn Yusuf al-Hadrami	2 July 742	21 March 745	3 years	Hisham; Al-Walid II; Yazid III; Ibrahim; Marwan II	Resigned
22	Hassan ibn Atahiya	21 March 745	7 April 745	2.5 weeks	Marwan II	Ran away after opposition by the Hafsiya
(21)	Hafs ibn al-Walid ibn Yusuf al-Hadrami	7 April 745	4 October 745	6 months	Marwan II	Installed by the Hafsiya, surrendered to his successor without a fight
23	al-Hawthala ibn Suhayl al-Bahili	4 October 745	19 March 749	6 months	Marwan II	Unseated
24	Al-Mughira ibn Ubaydallah al-Fazari	19 March 749	March 750	1 year	Marwan II	Died
25	Abd al-Malik ibn Marwan ibn Musa ibn Nusayr	March 750	9 August 750	6 months	Marwan II	Unseated by the Abbasids

== Walis under Abbasid Caliphate (750–969) ==
=== First Abbasid period (750–868) ===
Dates taken from John Stewart's African States and Rulers (2005).

#	Name	Start	End	Period	Caliph	Notes
1	Salih ibn Ali ibn Abdallah ibn al-Abbas	9 August 750	2 April 751	8 months	As-Saffah	Became the wali of Palestine
2	Abu Awn Abd al-Malik ibn Yazid	2 April 751	27 October 753	2 years	As-Saffah	Ran away after an epidemic
(1)	Salih ibn Ali ibn Abdallah ibn al-Abbas	27 October 753	21 February 755	1.5 years	As-Saffah; Al-Mansur	Unseated
(2)	Abu Awn Abd al-Malik ibn Yazid	21 February 755	26 August 758	3 years	Al-Mansur; Al-Mahdi	Unseated
3	Musa ibn Ka'b al-Tamimi	26 August 758	28 April 759	8 months	Al-Mahdi	Died
4	Muhammad ibn al-Ash'ath al-Khuza'i	28 April 759	18 December 760	8 months	Al-Mahdi	Unseated
5	Humayd ibn Qahtaba	18 December 760	14 February 762	2 years	Al-Mahdi	Unseated
6	Yazid ibn Hatim al-Muhallabi	14 February 762	30 April 769	7 years	Al-Mahdi	Unseated
7	Abdallah ibn Abd al-Rahman ibn Mu'awiya ibn Hudayj al-Tujibi	30 April 769	February 772	3 years	Al-Mahdi	Died
8	Muhammad ibn Abd al-Rahman ibn Mu'awiya ibn Hudayj al-Tujibi	February 772	18 September 772	7 months	Al-Mahdi	Died
9	Musa ibn Ali ibn Rabah al-Lakhmi	18 September 772	14 September 778	6 years	Al-Mahdi	Unseated
10	Isa ibn Luqman al-Jumahi	14 September 778	18 March 779	6 months	Al-Mahdi	Unseated
11	Wadih al-Maskin	18 March 779	1 June 779	2 months	Al-Mahdi	Unseated
12	Mansur ibn Yazid ibn Mansur	1 June 779	August 779	3 months	Al-Mahdi	Unseated
13	Yahya ibn Sa'id al-Harashi	August 779	15 September 780	1 year	Al-Mahdi	Unseated
14	Salim ibn Sawada al-Tamimi	15 September 780	6 September 781	1 year	Al-Mahdi	Unseated
15	Ibrahim ibn Salih ibn Abdallah ibn al-Abbas	6 September 781	1 July 784	3 years	Al-Mahdi	Unseated
16	Musa ibn Mus'ab al-Khath'ami	1 July 784	10 July 785	1 year	Al-Mahdi	Killed
17	Asama ibn Amr	10 July 785	11 August 785	1 month	Al-Mahdi; Al-Hadi	Unseated
18	al-Fadl ibn Salih ibn Ali al-Abbasi	11 August 785	April 786	9 months	Al-Hadi	Unseated
19	Ali ibn Sulayman al-Abbasi	April 786	15 September 787	1 year	Al-Hadi; Harun al-Rashid	Unseated by the new Abbasid wali
20	Musa ibn Isa ibn Musa al-Abbasi	15 September 787	15 February 789	2.5 years	Harun al-Rashid	Unseated
21	Maslama ibn Yahya al-Bajali	15 February 789	28 December 789	10 months	Harun al-Rashid	Unseated
22	Muhammad ibn Zuhayr al-Azdi	28 December 789	2 June 790	5 months	Harun al-Rashid	Unseated
23	Dawud ibn Yazid ibn Hatim al-Muhallabi	2 June 790	15 June 791	1 year	Harun al-Rashid	Unseated
(20)	Musa ibn Isa ibn Musa al-Abbasi	15 June 791	June 792	1 year	Harun al-Rashid	Unseated
24	Ibrahim ibn Salih ibn Abdallah ibn al-Abbas	June 792	1 January 793	6 months	Harun al-Rashid	Died
25	Abdallah ibn al-Musayyab ibn Zuhayr al-Dabbi	1 January 793	12 October 793	10 months	Harun al-Rashid	Unseated
26	Ishaq ibn Sulayman	12 October 793	1 November 794	1 year	Harun al-Rashid	Unseated
27	Harthama ibn A'yan	1 November 794	9 January 795	2 months	Harun al-Rashid	Became the wali of Ifriqiya
28	Abd al-Malik ibn Salih	9 January 795	27 March 796	1 year	Harun al-Rashid	Unseated
(25)	Abdallah ibn al-Musayyab ibn Zuhayr al-Dabbi	795	795	1 year	Harun al-Rashid	Deputy to Abd al-Malik ibn Salih.
29	Ubaydallah ibn al-Mahdi al-Abbasi	27 March 796	2 November 796	7 months	Harun al-Rashid	Unseated
(20)	Musa ibn Isa ibn Musa al-Abbasi	2 November 796	17 August 797	7 months	Harun al-Rashid	Unseated
(29)	Ubaydallah ibn al-Mahdi al-Abbasi	17 August 797	2 November 797	3 months	Harun al-Rashid	Unseated
30	Isma'il ibn Salih ibn Ali al-Abbasi	2 November 797	4 August 798	9 months	Harun al-Rashid	Unseated
31	Isma'il ibn Isa al-Abbasi	4 August 798	10 December 798	4 months	Harun al-Rashid	Unseated
32	Al-Layth ibn al-Fadl	10 December 798	21 June 803	4.5 years	Harun al-Rashid	Unseated
33	Ahmad ibn Ismail ibn Ali ibn Abdallah al-Abbasi	21 June 803	15 September 805	2 years	Harun al-Rashid	Unseated
34	Abdallah ibn Muhammad al-Abbasi	15 September 805	30 July 806	10 months	Harun al-Rashid	Unseated
35	Al-Husayn ibn Jamil	30 July 806	24 February 808	1.5 years	Harun al-Rashid	Unseated
36	Malik ibn Dalham al-Kalbi	24 February 808	25 December 808	10 months	Harun al-Rashid	Unseated
37	Al-Hasan ibn al-Takhtakh	25 December 808	11 July 810	1.5 years	Harun al-Rashid; Al-Amin	Unseated
38	Hatim ibn Harthamah ibn A'yan	11 July 810	25 March 811	8 months	Al-Amin	Unseated
39	Jabir ibn al-Ash'ath al-Ta'i	25 March 811	25 March 812	1 year	Al-Amin	Beaten off from Egypt
40	Abbad ibn Muhammad ibn Hayyan	25 March 812	13 November 813	1.5 years	Al-Amin; Al-Ma'mun	Unseated
41	Al-Muttalib ibn Abdallah al-Khuza'i	13 November 813	21 June 814	7 months	Al-Ma'mun	Unseated
42	Al-Abbas ibn Musa ibn Isa al-Abbasi	21 June 814	4 September 814	2.5 months	Al-Ma'mun	-
(41)	Al-Muttalib ibn Abdallah al-Khuza'i	4 September 814	3 April 815	7 months	Al-Ma'mun	Beaten off from Egypt
43	Al-Sari ibn al-Hakam	3 April 815	30 September 816	1.5 months	Al-Ma'mun	Soldiers revolted against him
44	Sulayman ibn Ghalib ibn Jibril al-Bajali	30 September 816	28 February 817	5 months	Al-Ma'mun	Soldiers revolted against him
(43)	Al-Sari ibn al-Hakam	28 February 817	10 December 820	3 years	Al-Ma'mun	-
45	Abu Nasr ibn al-Sari	10 December 820	7 January 822	1 year	Al-Ma'mun	-
46	Khalid ibn Yazid ibn Mazyad	822	822	1 year	Al-Ma'mun	-
47	Ubaydallah ibn al-Sari	822	17 April 826	4 years	Al-Ma'mun	Unseated by the new wali
48	Abdallah ibn Tahir al-Khurasani	17 April 826	December 828	2.5 years	Al-Ma'mun	Departed for Iraq
?	unknown	December 828	21 January 829	2 months	Al-Ma'mun	Acting governor
49	Isa ibn Yazid al-Juludi	21 January 829	27 January 829	1 week	Al-Ma'mun	Unseated
50	Umayr ibn al-Walid	27 January 829	28 April 829	3 months	Al-Ma'mun	Appointed by Abu Ishaq, killed in an anti-taxation rebellion
?	unknown	28 April 829	June 829	2 months	Al-Ma'mun	Acting governor
(49)	Isa ibn Yazid al-Juludi	June 829	830	1 year	Al-Ma'mun	Unseated
51	Abu Ishaq Muhammad ibn Harun al-Rashid	830	28 February 830	2 months	Al-Ma'mun	-
52	Abdawayh ibn Jabalah	28 February 830	18 February 831	1 year	Al-Ma'mun	Unseated
53	Isa ibn Mansur al-Rafi'i	18 February 831	832	1 year	Al-Ma'mun	Unseated
54	Al-Ma'mun	832	March 832	3 months	Al-Ma'mun	-
55	Kaydar Nasr ibn Abdallah	March 832	June 834	2 years	Al-Ma'mun; Al-Mu'tasim	Died
56	Muzaffar ibn Kaydar	June 834	9 September 834	3 months	Al-Mu'tasim	Unseated
57	Musa ibn Abi al-Abbas	9 September 834	12 February 839	4.5 years	Al-Mu'tasim	-
58	Malik ibn Kaydar	12 February 839	5 February 841	2 years	Al-Mu'tasim	Unseated
59	Ali ibn Yahya al-Armani	5 February 841	6 October 843	2.5 years	Al-Mu'tasim; Al-Wathiq	Unseated
60	Isa ibn Mansur al-Rafi'i	6 October 843	December 847	4 years	Al-Wathiq; Al-Mutawakkil	Unseated
?	unknown	December 847	15 February 848	3 months	Al-Mutawakkil	Acting governor
61	Harthamah ibn al-Nadr al-Jabali	15 February 848	3 April 849	1 year	Al-Mutawakkil	Died
62	Hatim ibn Harthamah ibn al-Nadr	3 April 849	3 May 849	1 month	Al-Mutawakkil	Unseated
(59)	Ali ibn Yahya al-Armani	3 May 849	27 May 850	1 year	Al-Mutawakkil	Unseated
63	Ishaq ibn Yahya ibn Mu'adh	27 May 850	27 May 851	1 year	Al-Mutawakkil	Unseated
64	Khut Abd al-Wahid ibn Yahya	27 May 851	24 September 852	1 year	Al-Mutawakkil	Unseated
65	Anbasah ibn Ishaq al-Dabbi	24 September 852	22 November 856	4 years	Al-Mutawakkil	Unseated
66	Yazid ibn Abdallah al-Hulwani	22 November 856	13 March 867	10.5 years	Al-Mutawakkil; Al-Muntasir; Al-Musta'in; Al-Mu'tazz	Unseated
67	Muzahim ibn Khaqan	13 March 867	7 April 868	1 year	Al-Mu'tazz	Died
68	Ahmad ibn Muzahim ibn Khaqan	7 April 868	June 868	3 months	Al-Mu'tazz	Died
69	Azjur al-Turki	June 868	15 September 868	4 months	Al-Mu'tazz	Unseated

=== Tulunid Emirs (868–905) ===
Dates taken from John Stewart's African States and Rulers (2005).

#	Name	Start	End	Period	Notes
1	Ahmad ibn Tulun	15 September 868	20 May 884	16 years	Governor under Al-Mu'tazz and Al-Muhtadi, becoming autonomous during Al-Mu'tamid's reign. Died in office
2	Khumarawayh ibn Tulun	20 May 884	18 January 896	12 years	Murdered
3	Jaysh ibn Khumarawayh	18 January 896	26 July 896	6 months	Unseated. Died in prison in November 896
4	Harun ibn Khumarawayh	26 July 896	30 December 904	8.5 years	Murdered
5	Shayban ibn Ahmad	30 December 904	10 January 905	11 days	Surrendered to the Abbasids during Al-Muktafi's reign
6	Muhammad ibn Ali al-Khalanji	10 January 905	August 905	8 months	Revolted against Abbasids and held Egypt before being arrested and sent to Baghdad.

=== Second Abbasid period (905–935) ===
Dates taken from John Stewart's African States and Rulers (2005).

#	Name	Start	End	Period	Caliph	Notes
1	Isa al-Nushari	August 905	September 905	1 month	Al-Muktafi	Unseated
2	Muhammad al-Khalangi	September 905	May 906	9 months	Al-Muktafi	Usurper
(1)	Isa al-Nushari	May 906	9 May 910	4 years	Al-Muktafi; Al-Muqtadir	Died
3	Abu'l Abbas	13 June 910	23 June 910	10 days	Al-Muqtadir	-
4	Takin ibn Abdallah al-Khazari	23 June 910	27 August 915	5 years	Al-Muqtadir	Unseated
5	Dhuka al-Rumi	27 August 915	8 August 919	4 years	Al-Muqtadir	Died
(4)	Takin ibn Abdallah al-Khazari	8 August 919	22 July 921	2 years	Al-Muqtadir	Unseated
6	Mahmun ibn Hamal	22 July 921	25 July 921	3 days	Al-Muqtadir	-
(4)	Takin ibn Abdallah al-Khazari	25 July 921	14 August 921	3 weeks	Al-Muqtadir	Unseated
7	Abu'l-Hasan Hilal ibn Badr	14 August 921	17 August 923	3 days	Al-Muqtadir	Unseated
8	Ahmad ibn Kayghalagh	17 August 923	12 February 924	6 months	Al-Muqtadir	Unseated
(4)	Takin ibn Abdallah al-Khazari	12 February 924	16 March 933	9 years	Al-Muqtadir; Al-Qahir	Died
9	Muhammad ibn Takin	16 March 933	30 September 933	6 months	Al-Qahir	Unseated
10	Muhammad ibn Tughj al-Ikhshid	933	933	1 year	Al-Qahir	Did not take office.
(8)	Ahmad ibn Kayghalagh	30 September 933	934	1 year	Al-Qahir; Al-Radi	Unseated
(9)	Muhammad ibn Takin	934	2 September 935	1 year	Al-Radi	-

=== Ikhshidid Emirs (935–969) ===
Dates taken from John Stewart's African States and Rulers (2005).

#	Coin	Name	Start	End	Period	Notes
1		Muhammad ibn Tughj al-Ikhshid	2 September 935	24 July 946	11 years	Named governor by Al-Radi, becoming autonomous after his death. Died in office
2		Unujur ibn al-Ikhshid	24 July 946	29 December 960	14.5 years	Died
3		Ali ibn al-Ikhshid	1 January 961	7 February 965	4 years	Died
4		Abu al-Misk Kafur	8 February 965	23 April 968	3 years	Vizier and de facto ruler since 946. Died in office
5		Ahmad ibn Ali	23 April 968	5 August 969	1.5 years	Deposed by the Fatimid conquest

== Fatimid Caliphate (969–1171) ==
Dates for Caliphs taken from John Stewart's African States and Rulers (2005).

#	Coin	Name	Start	End	Period	Notes
-		Jawhar al-Siqilli	5 August 969	June 973	4 years	Led the Fatimid conquest and ruled as the viceroy until the arrival of al-Mu'izz from Ifriqiya. Constructed a new capital at Cairo.
1		al-Mu'izz li-Din Allah	June 973	10 December 975	2 years	Ruled till death
2		al-Aziz Billah	10 December 975	14 October 996	21 years	Ruled till death
3		al-Hakim bi-Amr Allah	14 October 996	13 February 1021	24.5 years	Disappeared (possibly assassinated)
-		Barjawan	October 997	March 1000	5 months	De facto regent for al-Hakim. Assassinated
4		al-Zahir li-I'zaz Din Allah	13 February 1021	13 June 1036	15.5 years	-
-		Sitt al-Mulk	13 February 1021	5 February 1023	2 years	Regent for young al-Zahir. Died
5		al-Mustansir Billah	13 June 1036	29 December 1094	58.5 years	-
-		Ali ibn Ahmad al-Jarjara'i	1036	27 March 1045	9 years	Vizier and de facto regent for al-Mustansir.
-		Rasad	27 March 1045	1062	17 years	Consort of Al-Mustansir Stripped of property after defeat by the Turks
6		al-Musta'li billah	31 December 1094	8 December 1101	7 years	-
7		al-Amir bi-Ahkami'l-Lah	8 December 1101	17 October 1130	29 years	Killed
-		Abd al-Majid ibn Muhammad	1130	1130	Less than a year	Cousin of al-Amir. Regent for al-Tayyib ibn Al-Amir. Overthrown by Kutayfat
-		Kutayfat	1130	1131	1 year	Fatimid Vizier. Killed
8		al-Hafiz li Din Allah	1131	October 1149	18 years	Took over the caliphal title.
9		al-Zafir bi Amr Allah	October 1149	16 April 1154	4.5 years	Killed
10		al-Fa'iz bi-Nasr Allah	16 April 1154	23 July 1160	6 years	Died of epileptic seizure.
-		Tala'i ibn Ruzzik	16 April 1154	10 September 1161	7.5 years	Regent for al-Fa'iz. Assassinated
11		al-Adid li-Din Allah	23 July 1160	10 September 1171	11 years	Unseated by Saladin. Died soon after.
-		Saladin	26 March 1169	26 September 1171	1.5 years	Vizier and de facto ruler. Abolished the dynasty after al-Adid's death and switched the country's allegiance to Abbasids.

== Sultanate of Egypt (1171–1517) ==
=== Ayyubid Sultanate (1171–1254) ===
Dates taken from John Stewart's African States and Rulers (2005).

#	Coin	Name	Start	End	Period	Notes
1		Saladin	26 September 1171	May 1174	3 years	Ruled as governor of Egypt for Zengids
1		Saladin	May 1174	4 March 1193	19 years	Assumed the title of Sultan. Ruled till death
2		al-Aziz Uthman	4 March 1193	29 November 1198	5.5 years	Ruled till death
3		al-Mansur Muhammad	29 November 1198	February 1200	1.5 years	Deposed
4		al-Adil I	February 1200	31 August 1218	18.5 years	Ruled till death
5		al-Kamil	2 September 1218	8 March 1238	19.5 years	Ruled till death
6		al-Adil II	8 March 1238	31 May 1240	2 years	Deposed by his brother and successor Salih
7		as-Salih Ayyub	1 June 1240	21 November 1249	9.5 years	Ruled till death
-		Shajar al-Durr	21 November 1249	27 February 1250	3 months	Regent for Turanshah while he arrived to capital Cairo.
8		al-Mu'azzam Turanshah	21 November 1249	2 May 1250	5 months	Assassinated by the Mamluks
9		al-Ashraf Musa	4 August 1250	1254	4 years	Installed by Aybak as nominal co-sultan Eventually deposed by him.

=== Mamluk Sultanate (1250–1517) ===
==== Bahri Mamluks (1250–1382, 1389–1390) ====
Dates taken from John Stewart's African States and Rulers (2005), unless otherwise stated.

#	Coin	Name	Start	End	Period	Notes
-		Shajar al-Durr	2 May 1250	31 July 1250	3 months	Installed as Sultan by Mamluks. (Note: Shajar al-Durr has often been referred to as a "Sultana", but there is in fact no feminine form of Sultan and she herself used the title "Sultan" on her coinage.) Abdicated to Aybak
1		al-Mu'izzz Aybak	31 July 1250	10 April 1257	7 years	Assassinated by Shajar al-Durr
2		al-Mansur Ali	15 April 1257	November 1259	2.5 years	Dethroned by Qutuz
3		al-Muzaffar Qutuz	November 1259	24 October 1260	1 year	Assassinated by Baybars
4		az-Zahir Baybars	24 October 1260	1 July 1277	17 years	Died
5		as-Said Barakah	3 July 1277	August 1279	2 years	Resigned
6		al-Adil Solamish	August 1279	November 1279	3 months	Dethroned
7		al-Mansur Qalawun	November 1279	10 November 1290	11 years	Died
8		al-Ashraf Khalil	12 November 1290	12 December 1293	3 years	Assassinated
9		an-Nasir Muhammad	14 December 1293	December 1294	1 year	Dethroned
10		al-Adil Kitbugha	December 1294	7 December 1296	2 years	Escaped
11		al-Mansur Lajin	7 December 1296	16 January 1299	2 years	Assassinated
(9)		an-Nasir Muhammad	16 January 1299	March 1309	10 years	Resigned
12		al-Muzaffar Baybars II al-Jashnakir	April 1309	5 March 1310	11 months	Executed
(9)		an-Nasir Muhammad	5 March 1310	6 June 1341	31 years	Died
13		al-Mansur Abu Bakr	8 June 1341	August 1341	2 months	Dethroned
14		al-Ashraf Kujuk	August 1341	21 January 1342	5 months	Dethroned
15		an-Nasir Ahmad	21 January 1342	27 June 1342	5 months	Dethroned
16		as-Salih Isma'il	27 June 1342	3 August 1345	3 years	Died
17		al-Kamil Sha'ban	3 August 1345	18 September 1346	1 year	Killed
18		al-Muzaffar Hajji	18 September 1346	10 December 1347	1 year	Killed
19		an-Nasir Hassan	December 1347	24 August 1351	3.5 years	Dethroned
20		as-Salih Salih	21 August 1351	20 October 1354	3 years	Custody
(19)		an-Nasir Hassan	20 October 1354	16 March 1361	6.5 years	Disappeared /prob. killed
21		al-Mansur Muhammad	17 March 1361	28 May 1363	2 years	Dethroned for insanity
22		al-Ashraf Sha'ban II	29 May 1363	15 March 1377	14 years	Executed
23		al-Mansur Ali II	15 March 1377	19 May 1381	4 years	Died in epidemic
24		as-Salih Hajji II	19 May 1381	26 November 1382	1.5 years	Usurped by his regent Barquq.
24		as-Salih Hajji II	1 June 1389	January 1390	7 months	Deposed

==== Burji Mamluks (1382–1389, 1390–1517) ====
#	Coin	Name	Start	End	Period	Notes
25		az-Zahir Barquq	26 November 1382	1 June 1389	6.5 years	Fled to Al-Karak
25		az-Zahir Barquq	21 January 1390	20 June 1399	9.5 years	Died
26		an-Nasir Faraj	20 June 1399	20 September 1405	6 years	Escaped
27		al-Mansur Abd al-Aziz	20 September 1405	November 1405	2 months	Died in custody
(26)		an-Nasir Faraj	November 1405	23 May 1412	6.5 years	Dethroned / Killed
28		al-Musta'in Billah	23 May 1412	6 November 1412	5 months	Caliph of Cairo. Deposed
29		al-Mu'ayyad Shaykh	6 November 1412	13 January 1421	8 years	Died
30		al-Muzaffar Ahmad	13 January 1421	29 August 1421	7 months	Dethroned
31		az-Zahir Tatar	29 August 1421	30 November 1421	3 months	Died
32		as-Salih Muhammad	30 November 1421	1 April 1422	5 months	Dethroned
33		al-Ashraf Barsbay	1 April 1422	7 June 1438	16 years	Died
34		al-Aziz Yusuf	7 June 1438	9 September 1438	3 months	Dethroned
35		az-Zahir Jaqmaq	9 September 1438	1 February 1453	14.5 years	Dethroned
36		al-Mansur Uthman	1 February 1453	15 March 1453	1 month	Dethroned
37		al-Ashraf Inal	15 March 1453	26 February 1461	8 years	Resigned due to illness and died
38		al-Mu'ayyad Ahmad	26 February 1461	28 June 1461	4 months	Dethroned
39		az-Zahir Khushqadam	28 June 1461	9 October 1467	6.5 years	Died
40		az-Zahir Bilbay	9 October 1467	4 December 1467	2 months	Dethroned and died in custody
41		az-Zahir Timurbugha	4 December 1467	31 January 1468	2 months	Dethroned
42		al-Ashraf Qaitbay	31 January 1468	7 August 1496	28.5 years	Abdicated to his son
43		an-Nasir Muhammad	7 August 1496	31 October 1498	2 years	Assassinated
44		az-Zahir Qansuh	31 October 1498	30 June 1500	2 years	Abdicated
45		al-Ashraf Janbalat	30 June 1500	25 January 1501	7 months	Dethroned
46		al-Adil Tumanbay	25 January 1501	20 April 1501	3 months	Deposed and executed
47		al-Ashraf Qansuh II	20 April 1501	24 August 1516	15 years	Killed at the Battle of Marj Dabiq
48		al-Ashraf Tuman Bay II	17 October 1516	15 April 1517	6 months	Executed by the Ottoman Sultan Selim I

== Sources ==
- Bosworth, Clifford E., The New Islamic Dynasties: A Chronological and Genealogical Manual, Columbia University Press, New York, 1996 (Google Books)
- Kennedy, Hugh N. (1998). "Egypt as a Province in the Islamic Caliphate, 641–868". In Petry, Carl F. (ed.). The Cambridge History of Egypt. Cambridge: Cambridge University Press. pp. 62–85. ISBN 978-0-521-47137-4.
- Kennedy, Hugh (2004) [1986]. The Prophet and the Age of the Caliphates: The Islamic Near East from the 6th to the 11th Century (Second ed.). Harlow: Longman. ISBN 978-0-582-40525-7.

== See also ==
- Egypt in the Middle Ages
