= Isa ibn Mansur al-Rafi'i =

Abbasid governor of Egypt 831–832 and 843–847

Isa ibn Mansur al-Rafiqi, (Arabic: عيسى بن منصور الرافقي; died 847) alternatively known as al-Rafi'i, was a governor of Egypt for the Abbasid Caliphate, holding that position from 831 to 832 and again from 843 to 847.

== First governorship ==
Regarding Isa's background, the Egyptian chronicler Ibn Taghribirdi identified him as "Isa ibn Mansur ibn Musa ibn Isa al-Rafiqi, mawla of the Banu Nasr ibn Mu'awiyah" tribe of the Qays 'Aylan. In 830 he is mentioned by al-Kindi in connection with the suppression of a revolt in the Hawf district of Egypt during the governorship of Abdawayh ibn Jabalah. Following Abdawayh's dismissal in the following year, Isa was appointed as resident governor in his stead by Abu Ishaq (the future caliph al-Mu'tasim, r. 833–842), who held overall authority over the administration of Egypt and Syria, and he began his governorship around the beginning of 831.

Shortly after Isa became governor, he was forced to deal with a major rebellion in Lower Egypt, where the local Arabs and Copts united to oppose the government. Isa prepared to fight against the rebels, but he quickly realised that his forces were too weak and was compelled to retreat from them instead. Assistance soon came when al-Afshin marched east from Barqah, arriving in al-Fustat near the end of July 831. After waiting for the seasonal flooding of the Nile to subside, al-Afshin and Isa set out, engaged the forces of the rebel leader Ibn Ubaydas al-Fihri and defeated them. Al-Afshin then proceeded to fight his way through the Nile Delta, eventually entering Alexandria in January 832, while Isa for his part returned to Fustat, then marched out again and scored a victory against the rebels at Tumayy.

In 832 the caliph al-Ma'mun (r. 813–833) decided to personally go to Egypt, arriving in the province in February. There he upbraided Isa, holding him responsible for the outbreak of the rebellion, and accusing him of allowing the tax collectors to behave tyrannically against the people and of concealing the true state of affairs in the province. Isa's banners were struck and he was forced to wear white garments (as opposed to the Abbasid color of black), and he lost the governorship of Egypt. Al-Ma'mun and al-Afshin then defeated the remaining rebels and Ibn Ubaydus was executed.

== Second governorship ==
In 843 Isa was again appointed as resident governor of Egypt. He was initially selected for the position by the Turkish general Ashinas; when Ashinas died in 844, however, Isa reported instead to his replacement Itakh, who confirmed him as governor.

Upon the accession of the caliph al-Mutawakkil (r. 847–861) in August 847, Isa gave the oath of allegiance to him. Shortly after this, however, he was dismissed as governor in October and was replaced with Harthamah ibn al-Nadr al-Jabali. Soon after his dismissal he fell ill, and he died in the following month.

== Notes ==
Preceded by Abdawayh ibn Jabalah	Governor of Egypt; 831–832	Succeeded by Kaydar Nasr ibn Abdallah
Preceded by Ali ibn Yahya al-Armani	Governor of Egypt; 843–847	Succeeded by Harthamah ibn al-Nadr al-Jabali
