= Ishaq ibn Yahya ibn Mu'adh =

9th century Abbasid governor of Damascus and Egypt

Ishaq ibn Yahya ibn Mu'adh (Arabic: إسحاق بن يحيى بن معاذ; died 851) was a ninth-century provincial governor for the Abbasid Caliphate, serving as governor of Damascus and Egypt.

== Early career ==
Ishaq was the scion of a prominent family from Khurasan; his father Yahya ibn Mu'adh ibn Muslim was a senior official who had been governor of Damascus, Armenia and al-Jazira. Ishaq himself was appointed as resident governor of the district of Damascus during the reign of al-Ma'mun (r. 813–833) by the caliph's brother and successor Abu Ishaq al-Mu'tasim (r. 833–842), and remained there through the death of al-Ma'mun in 833. During this period Ishaq was ordered by al-Mu'tasim to carry out the mihnah or inquisition regarding the createdness of the Qur'an, but he dealt leniently with the Damascenes on the matter.

Following the foundation of Samarra in 836, Ishaq received a land allotment along the Grand Avenue in the central city. In 840, al-Mu'tasim appointed him as commander of his guard (haras), and he retained that position for a period after al-Wathiq (r. 842–847) became caliph. In 843–4, al-Wathiq handed over Ahmad ibn Isra'il al-Anbari to Ishaq during a crackdown against the caliphal secretaries, and ordered him to flog Ahmad with ten lashes daily. During al-Wathiq's reign, Ishaq also served as governor of Damascus.

Under al-Mutawakkil (r. 847–861), Ishaq again commanded the haras.

== Governorship of Egypt ==
In 850, Ishaq was appointed as resident governor of Egypt by al-Muntasir, who had been assigned the province as part of al-Mutawakkil's succession arrangements. Ishaq's appointment gave him control of security and the prayers, together with the land tax (kharaj).

During his term in Egypt, Ishaq received an order from al-Mutawakkil and al-Muntasir, commanding him to deport all of the 'Alids then in Egypt. He accordingly provided a traveling allowance of 30 dinars for each 'Alid male and 15 dinars for each female, after which they set out from al-Fustat in January 851. Following their arrival in Iraq, they were exiled to Medina.

In May/June 851, Ishaq was dismissed from the governorship and replaced with Khut Abd al-Wahid ibn Yahya. He died in Egypt shortly after his dismissal, in September/October 851, and was buried in the City of the Dead.

== Notes ==
Preceded by Ali ibn Yahya al-Armani	Governor of Egypt; 850–851	Succeeded by Khut Abd al-Wahid ibn Yahya
