= Al-Hasan ibn al-Takhtakh =

Abbasid governor of Egypt

Al-Hasan ibn al-Takhtakh الحسن بن التختاخ

Abbasid Governor of Egypt
- In office 808 – 809 (eleven months)
- Monarch: Harun al-Rashīd
- Preceded by: Malik ibn Dalham al-Kalbi
- Succeeded by: Hatim ibn Harthamah ibn A'yan

Personal details
- Parent: al-Takhtakh (father)

Al-Hasan ibn al-Takhtakh (Arabic: الحسن بن التختاخ) was a governor of Egypt for the Abbasid Caliphate, from 808 to 809.

He was appointed as governor by the caliph Harun al-Rashid, and arrived in the province in late December 808. His administration was a turbulent one, with a large revolt among the Egyptian army resulting in the deaths of a large number of both soldiers and civilians; at the same time, a shipment of Egyptian tax money bound for the capital was seized en route by the residents of Ramla, who used it for payment of their stipends (ata).

Al-Hasan remained as governor until late 809, when he was dismissed in favor of Hatim ibn Harthamah ibn A'yan. After appointing interim officials to oversee matters of security and taxation pending his successor's arrival, he departed from Egypt using the route to the Hijaz, the road to Syria being considered unsafe for travel at the time.

== Notes ==
Preceded by Malik ibn Dalham al-Kalbi	Governor of Egypt; 808–809	Succeeded by Hatim ibn Harthamah ibn A'yan
