= Ibrahim ibn Salih =

Abbasid provincial governor (died 792)

Ibrahim ibn Salih إبراهيم بن صالح

Governor of Egypt
- In office 781 – 784 (first term)
- Monarch: Al-Mahdi
- Preceded by: Salim ibn Sawadah al-Tamimi
- Succeeded by: Musa ibn Mus'ab al-Khath'ami

Governor of al-Sham (Syria)
- In office 780s – c. 786
- Monarchs: Al-Mahdi, Al-Hadi
- Succeeded by: Muhammad ibn Ibrahim al-Imam

Governor of al-Jazira and Cyprus
- In office 785–786
- Monarch: Al-Hadi

Governor of al-Sham (Syria)
- In office 788–791
- Monarch: Harun al-Rashīd
- Preceded by: Muhammad ibn Ibrahim al-Imam
- Succeeded by: Musa ibn Isa ibn Musa al-Hashimi

Governor of Egypt
- In office 792 – 792 (second term)
- Monarch: Harun al-Rashid
- Preceded by: Musa ibn Isa al-Hashimi
- Succeeded by: Abdallah ibn al-Musayyab al-Dabbi

Personal details
- Died: c. 792 Egypt, Abbasid Caliphate
- Spouse: Abbasa bint al-Mahdi
- Relations: Abbasid dynasty
- Parent: Salih ibn Ali (father)
- Relatives: Al-Fadl (brother); Isma'il (brother); Abd al-Malik (brother)

Ibrāhīm ibn Ṣāliḥ ibn ʿAlī al-Hāshimī (Arabic: إبراهيم بن صالح بن علي الهاشمي; died 792) was a member of the Banu al-Abbas who served as a governor of various provinces in Syria and Egypt in the late eighth century.

== Career ==
Ibrahim was a son of Salih ibn Ali, a military commander who participated in the conquest of Syria and Egypt during the Abbasid Revolution and later became governor of both regions. As a member of the Banu al-Abbas, he was a first cousin to the first two Abbasid caliphs al-Saffah (r. 750–754) and al-Mansur (r. 754–775), and was additionally a son-in-law to the third caliph al-Mahdi (r. 775–785) by virtue of his marriage to the latter's daughter Abbasa.

In 781, Ibrahim was appointed by al-Mahdi as governor of Egypt, with jurisdiction over both military and financial affairs within the province. During his administration, one Dihyah ibn Mus'ab, a descendant of the Umayyad Abd al-Aziz ibn Marwan, launched an anti-tax revolt in Upper Egypt and proclaimed himself as caliph. Ibrahim apparently had an unenthusiastic response to the affair, and within a short time, much of Upper Egypt had fallen under Dihyah's control. As a result of his failure to stamp out the rebel, an angered al-Mahdi removed him from office in 784, and his assistants were forced to hand over a fine of 300,000 dinars to his successor Musa ibn Mus'ab al-Khath'ami before he could return to Baghdad.

During the 780s, Ibrahim held several governorships in his father's old powerbase in Syria. As early as 780, he is mentioned as being governor of Palestine, and by the end of al-Mahdi's reign, he was in charge of the districts of Damascus and Jordan. Under al-Hadi (r. 785–786), he was retained in those positions and was additionally granted Cyprus and the Jazira. Following the accession of Harun al-Rashid, he lost his offices, but in 788, he was restored to the governorship of Damascus.

During his later tenure in Damascus, Ibrahim was forced to deal with a violent conflict that had broken out between the Qays and Yemen tribes of the region. He was eventually able to negotiate a truce between the two factions in 791, after which he led a delegation of Syrian ashraf to meet the caliph in Iraq. Despite his efforts, however, the cessation of hostilities proved to be short-lived, as the rebellion of Abu al-Haydham broke out soon after his departure from the province.

Ibrahim died in 792, shortly after having been appointed governor of Egypt a second time.

== Notes ==
Preceded by Salim ibn Sawadah al-Tamimi	Governor of Egypt; 781–784	Succeeded by Musa ibn Mus'ab al-Khath'ami
Preceded by Musa ibn Isa ibn Musa al-Hashimi	Governor of Egypt; 792	Succeeded by Abdallah ibn al-Musayyab al-Dabbi
