= Musa ibn Mus'ab al-Khath'ami =

Provincial Abbasid governor

Musa ibn Mus'ab al-Khath'ami موسى بن مصعب الخثعمي

Abbasid Governor of al-Jazira
- In office c. 773 – c. 776 Co-leading with Khalid ibn Barmak
- Monarch: al-Mansur
- Preceded by: Musa ibn Ka'b
- Succeeded by: Ishaq ibn Sulayman

Abbasid Governor of Mosul
- In office 783–784
- Monarch: al-Mahdi
- Preceded by: Ahmad ibn Isma'il ibn Ali
- Succeeded by: Abd al-Samad ibn Ali or Ahmad ibn Isma'il ibn Ali

Abbasid Governor of Egypt
- In office 784 – 785 (one year)
- Monarch: Al-Mahdi
- Preceded by: Ibrahim ibn Salih
- Succeeded by: Assamah ibn Amr

Personal details
- Died: 785 Egypt, Abbasid Caliphate
- Parent: Mus'ab ibn Rabi' (father)

Musa ibn Mus'ab al-Khath'ami (Arabic: موسى بن مصعب الخثعمي) (died 785) was a provincial governor for the Abbasid Caliphate, serving at various times over the Jazira, Mosul, and Egypt.

== Career ==
Described as a mawla of the tribe of Khath'am, Musa was the son of Mus'ab ibn Rabi', a secretary to the last Umayyad caliph Marwan II who later submitted to the Abbasids during the Abbasid Revolution. He himself appears to have enjoyed close relations with the Abbasid ruling family, having reportedly been a milk brother to the third caliph al-Mahdi at Humayma.

During the reign of al-Mansur (r. 754–775), Musa was appointed on multiple occasions as governor of the Jazira and Mosul. While there he enacted severe taxation policies which led to widespread unrest and earned a lengthy condemnation of his activities in the Chronicle of Pseudo-Dionysius of Tell-Mahre. Al-Mahdi nevertheless returned him to the same post in 783–784, during which he carried out the caliph's plans to construct an enlargement of the Friday mosque in Mosul.

In 784 Musa was appointed governor of Egypt with jurisdiction over both its military and taxation affairs, and with the task of quelling the ongoing rebellion of Dihyah ibn Mus'ab in Upper Egypt. Within a short time of his arrival he seriously alienated a large segment of the population with his large tax increases, including a doubling of the tax on the faddan and imposing levies on the markets and beasts of burden, and his standing was further harmed after he was accused of accepting bribes. In response, the Qays and Yemen Arabs of the Hawf district united against him and proclaimed a war of resistance, while the infuriated members of the Fustat jund for their part formed a secret pact with the Hawfis to not fight against them. In the spring of 785 Musa led his armies out against the Hawfis, but in the resulting encounter he was defeated, abandoned by his men and killed by the rebels.

== Notes ==
Preceded by Ibrahim ibn Salih	Governor of Egypt; 784–785	Succeeded by Assamah ibn Amr al-Ma'afiri
