= Ishaq ibn Sulayman al-Hashimi =

8th–9th-century Abbasid governor and official

Ishaq ibn Sulayman al-Hashimi إسحاق بن سليمان الهاشمي

Governor of Mosul
- In office 776–776
- Monarch: Al-Mahdi
- Preceded by: Khalid ibn Barmak and Musa ibn Mus'ab al-Khath'ami
- Succeeded by: Hassan al-Sarawi (776–777)

Governor of Medina
- In office 786–787
- Monarch: Harun al-Rashid
- Preceded by: Umar ibn Abd al-Aziz ibn Abd Allah (785-786)
- Succeeded by: Abd al-Malik ibn Salih

Governor of Sindh and Makran
- In office 790–791
- Monarch: Harun al-Rashid
- Preceded by: Ibrahim ibn Salim
- Succeeded by: Muhammad ibn Tayfur al-Himyari

Governor of Egypt
- In office 793–794
- Monarch: Harun al-Rashid
- Preceded by: Abdallah ibn al-Musayyab al-Dabbi
- Succeeded by: Harthama ibn A'yan

Governor of Arminiya
- In office 812–813
- Monarch: Al-Amin
- Preceded by: Asad ibn Yazid al-Shaybani (c. 810–813)
- Succeeded by: Tahir ibn Muhammad then Khalid ibn Yazid al-Shaybani

Personal details
- Died: Baghdad, Abbasid Caliphate
- Spouse: Aliyah bint al-Mansur
- Children: Al-Fadl ibn Ishaq al-Hashimi; Ja'far ibn Ishaq al-Hashimi
- Parent: Sulayman ibn Ali al-Hashimi (father)
- Relatives: Muhammad (brother); Ja'far (brother); Ali (brother); Zaynab (sister)

Abū Yaʿqūb Isḥāq ibn Sulaymān ibn ʿAlī al-Hāshimī (Arabic: إسحاق بن سليمان الهاشمي) was an 8th–9th-century AD Abbasid prince and historian. He held several official positions during his lifetime, including the governorships of Sind, Egypt, and Arminiyah.

== Career ==
Ishaq was a member of a collateral branch of the Abbasid royal dynasty, being a first cousin of the first two Abbasid caliphs al-Saffah (r. 750–754) and al-Mansur (r. 754–775). His father, Sulayman ibn Ali, had been a senior member of the family during his lifetime and had held the important governorship of Basra during the initial years following the Abbasid Revolution. He was also connected to the ruling line by his marriage to Aliyah, the daughter of al-Mansur and an Umayyad woman.

During the caliphates of al-Mahdi (r. 775–785), Harun al-Rashid (r. 786–809), and al-Amin (r. 809–813) Ishaq was posted to various provinces throughout the empire. In 776/7 he was appointed as governor of Mosul, and in 786–787 he was in charge of Medina. According to some sources he oversaw the summer raid (sa'ifa) against the Byzantines in 787/8 or 788/9, either leading it himself or dispatching Yazid ibn Anbasah al-Harashi to conduct it on his behalf. In 790/1 he was governor of Sind and Makran.

In 793 Ishaq was appointed as governor of Egypt. While there, he attempted to increase taxes on the local sharecroppers (muzari'un), which provoked the residents of the Hawf district to rise up in revolt. After Ishaq requested reinforcements from the caliph, the general Harthamah ibn A'yan arrived in Egypt with a large army and forced the rebels to submit. A short time afterwards Ishaq was dismissed in favor of Harthamah, having held the governorship for about a year.

In 795 Ishaq was appointed to his father's old power base at Basra. Around 809/10 he was the governor of Homs, but after a series of disturbances forced him to retreat from the city to Salamiyah he was dismissed and replaced with Abdallah ibn Sa'id al-Harashi.

By around 811/2 Ishaq was appointed by al-Amin as governor of Arminiyah, with his son al-Fadl serving as his deputy there. Following the commencement of the civil war between al-Amin and al-Ma'mun he decided to take a stand in the province and oppose al-Ma'mun's lieutenant Tahir ibn Muhammad al-San'ani, who had been sent to seize Arminiyah and Adharbayjan on behalf of his patron. After gathering the support of several local notables he set out for Barda, but was soon met by a large force led by Zuhayr ibn Sinan al-Tamimi that al-San'ani had dispatched against him. Following a battle that lasted for the greater part of a day Ishaq and his supporters were defeated, while his son Ja'far was captured and sent as a prisoner to al-Ma'mun.

According to al-Baghdadi, Ishaq died in Baghdad at an unspecified date.

== Notes ==
| Preceded by Khalid ibn Barmak | Governor of Mosul; 777 | Succeeded by Hasan al-Sarawi |
| Preceded by Ibrahim ibn Salim al-Yunusi | Governor of Sind c. 790 | Succeeded by Muhammad ibn Tayfur al-Himyari (?); OR; Kathir ibn Salm al-Bahili |
| Preceded by Abdallah ibn al-Musayyab al-Dabbi | Governor of Egypt; 793–794 | Succeeded by Harthamah ibn A'yan |
| Preceded by Ahmad ibn Yazid ibn Usayd (?) | Governor of Arminiyah c. 811/2–c.813 | Succeeded by Tahir ibn Muhammad al-San'ani |
