= Al-Abbas ibn Musa ibn Isa al-Hashimi =

Provincial Abbasid governor

Al-Abbas ibn Musa ibn Isa al-Hashimi العباس بن موسى بن عيسى

Abbasid Governor of Kufa
- In office 786 – late 780s
- Monarch: Harun al-Rashid

Abbasid Governor of Mecca
- Monarch: Harun al-Rashid

Amir al-Hajj
- In office 805, 812, 813, 814

Abbasid Governor of Egypt
- In office 814 – 814 (Less than a year)
- Monarch: al-Ma'mun
- Preceded by: Muttalib ibn Abdallah ibn Malik
- Succeeded by: Muttalib ibn Abdallah ibn malik

Personal details
- Died: 815 Bilbeis, Abbasid Caliphate (now Egypt)
- Relations: Abbasid dynasty
- Children: Abdallah
- Parent: Musa ibn Isa (father)

Al-Abbās ibn Mūsā ibn ʿĪsā (Arabic: العباس بن موسى بن عيسى) (died 815) was a minor member of the Abbasid dynasty. He held various posts in the late eighth and early ninth centuries, and played a supporting role in the events of the Fourth Fitna.

== Career ==
Al-Abbas was a grandson of Isa ibn Musa, the nephew of the first two Abbasid caliphs as-Saffah and al-Mansur and initial heir-apparent to the latter. Shortly after the accession of Harun al-Rashid in 786 he is mentioned as serving as deputy governor of Kufa for his father Musa, and later in Harun's reign he was appointed as full governor of that same city. In 805 he led the annual pilgrimage, and he also served as governor of Mecca at an unspecified date.

Following the death of Harun in 809, al-Abbas was initially employed by his successor al-Amin to act as an emissary to al-Ma'mun in Khurasan, but in the midst of the growing conflict between the two brothers he was soon persuaded to switch sides and offer his allegiance to al-Ma'mun instead. In March 812 he participated in the failed coup of al-Husayn ibn Ali ibn Isa, in which he was responsible for personally apprehending both al-Amin and his mother Zubaydah bint Ja'far, and he was subsequently selected to lead the first pilgrimages undertaken in al-Ma'mun's name, in 812, 813 and 814.

In June 814 al-Abbas was appointed as governor of Egypt by al-Ma'mun, and he deputized his son Abdallah to take control of that province in his name. Abdallah quickly developed poor relations with the local jund, however, and after less than three months in office he was overthrown by an army revolt, while the ex-governor al-Muttalib ibn Abdallah al-Khuza'i was freed from prison and restored to power in his place. Al-Abbas then responded by setting out for Egypt in an effort to intervene, but in February 815 he suddenly died at Bilbays, allegedly due to poisoning.

== Notes ==
Preceded by Al-Muttalib ibn Abdallah al-Khuza'i	Governor of Egypt; 814	Succeeded by Al-Muttalib ibn Abdallah al-Khuza'i
