= Yahya ibn Mu'adh ibn Muslim =

Abbasid Provincial governor (9th century)

Yahya ibn Mu'adh ibn Muslim يحيى بن معاذ بن مسلم

Abbasid Governor of Syria (Sham)
- In office 806–806
- Monarch: Harun al-Rashid
- Preceded by: Sulayman ibn al-Mansur (804–805)
- Succeeded by: Ali ibn al-Hasan ibn Qahtaba (807–809)

Abbasid Governor of Jazira
- In office 820s–820s
- Monarch: Al-Ma'mun

Abbasid Governor of Arminiyah
- In office 820s–820s
- Monarch: Al-Ma'mun

Personal details
- Died: c. 821/822; Abbasid Caliphate
- Children: Ahmad ibn Yahya ibn Mu'adh, Ishaq ibn Yahya ibn Mu'adh; Sulayman ibn Yahya ibn Mu'adh
- Parent: Mu'adh ibn Muslim

Yahya ibn Mu'adh ibn Muslim (Arabic: يحيى بن معاذ بن مسلم) was a senior official and governor for the Abbasid Caliphate.

Yahya was the son of the Persian mawla Mu'adh ibn Muslim, a distinguished member of the Khurasaniyya, who served the early Abbasids as governor and general. In 806, Caliph Harun al-Rashid sent Yahya to Syria to suppress the bandit leader Abu al-Nida. Yahya accomplished this task, and served as governor of all of Syria for a year. He then accompanied Harun in his journey to Khurasan to confront the revolt of Rafi ibn al-Layth, and after Harun's death in 809 remained in Khurasan with Harun's second son, al-Ma'mun. When the civil war with al-Amin broke out, he was offered the position of vizier to al-Ma'mun but refused—the post went to al-Fadl ibn Sahl—and remained uninvolved in the conflict. After the end of the civil war he served as governor of the Jazira and of Armenia, and took the field against the Khurramites of Babak Khorramdin. He died in 821/822.

His sons, Ahmad, Ishaq, and Sulayman, also held governorships and senior positions in the caliphal court.

== Sources ==
- Cobb, Paul M. (2001). White banners: contention in 'Abbāsid Syria, 750–880. Albany, NY: State University of New York Press. ISBN 0-7914-4880-0.
- Crone, Patricia (1980). Slaves on Horses: The Evolution of the Islamic Polity. Cambridge: Cambridge University Press. ISBN 0-521-52940-9.
