= Jat Muslim =

Ethnoreligious subgroup of South Asia

Total population
- ~21 million

Regions with significant populations
- Pakistan: ~21 million (2009 estimation)
- India: ~240,000 (1988 estimation)

Languages
- Punjabi • Sindhi • Jatki • Urdu • Khariboli • Haryanvi • Bagri • Hindi

Religion
- Islam

Related ethnic groups
- Jats, Jat Sikh

Jat Muslims or Musalman Jats (Punjabi: مسلمان٘ جٹ; Sindhi: مسلمان جت), are an ethno-religious subgroup of the Jat people, who follow Islam and are native to the northwestern South Asia. They are primarily found in the Pakistani regions of Punjab, Sindh and Azad Kashmir. A small minority is also present in Indian areas of Haryana and Western Uttar Pradesh, where they are referred to as Muley Jats.

Originally nomadic pastoralists in the lower Indus Valley, the Jats converted to the dominant religions of the region, namely Hinduism, Islam and Sikhism, only after adopting the settled agrarian lifestyle. The Jats began embracing Islam during the medieval period, influenced in part by Sufi teachings. The process of conversion was gradual.

== History ==
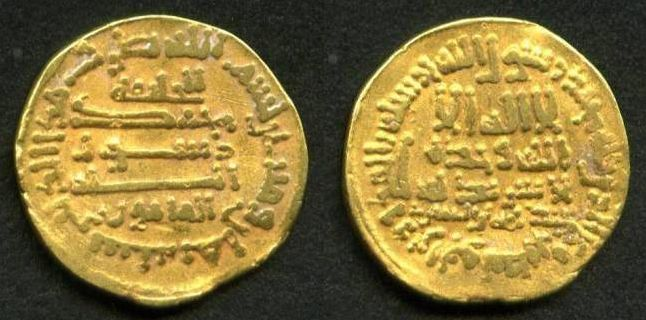
A gold dinar of the Jat emir Ubaydallah ibn al-Sari

The Jats were one of the first communities of the subcontinent to interact with the Muslims. Their name was Arabicised into Zuṭṭ (Arabic: الزُّطِّ) by the Arabic authors. The Arab scholars noted several agglomerations of Jats settled throughout the province of Sind and Makran, although sometimes tribes living in their vicinity were also considered a part of them. The Jats were originally from the Indus Valley, but had been settling in lower Iraq since the reign of Bahram V (r. 420–438). They were active as mercenaries, traders, and farmers in Iraq, and several of them like al-Sari and Abu Hatim al-Zuṭṭi played an active political role. Jats rose in a rebellion in the early 9th century in lower Iraq against the Abbasid rule but it failed, after which most of them were deported to Anazarbus near the Byzantine frontier. They are mentioned only sporadically afterwards, although Ibn al-Balkhi and Wassaf name several Jat emirs ruling Siraf and the neighbouring areas in southern Fars in the 12th and 13th centuries.

Between the 11th and 16th centuries, a number of Jats migrated northwards into Punjab. Many Jat clans have traditions of converting to Islam during this period, influenced by Sufis like Baba Farid. By the 16th century, a number of Punjabi tribes west of the Ravi River had become Muslim.

In Punjab, Jats gradually abandoned nomadic pastoralism in favour of agriculture. During Mughal period, Jats came to own considerable land and exert local influence. The Mughals never had direct control over many of these rural grandees. Some of them did enter the Mughal bureaucracy, like the family of the grand vizier Sa'adullah Khan Chinioti.

After the decline of the Mughal Empire, various groups vied to fill the resulting power vacuum. Among them were several ambitious Muslim Jat chiefs and princes; in Punjab, the Gondal Jats and the Chattha Jats carved out their petty states and fought against the expanding Sikh Misls. More successful was the dynasty founded by Ali Mohammed Khan in Rohilkhand, the rule of whose descendants, the Nawabs of Rampur, lasted into British period.

With the establishment of the British Raj, all formerly independent or autonomous polities were either annexed or integrated into the colonial empire as princely states. During British rule, a number of Punjabi Muslims, including Jats, would enlist in the British Indian Army. Most were recruited from the Pothohar Plateau.

Certain Jat Sikh families — such as the Mokals, Nakais, and Pahuwindias — had strong ties to the Lahore Durbar before their conversion to Islam, which granted them significant influence in the districts of Lahore, Kasur, Sahiwal, and Okara. These families maintained much of their social and political standing after the subsequent Partition of Punjab, like the family of former Chief Minister of Punjab, Arif Nakai.

== Demographics ==
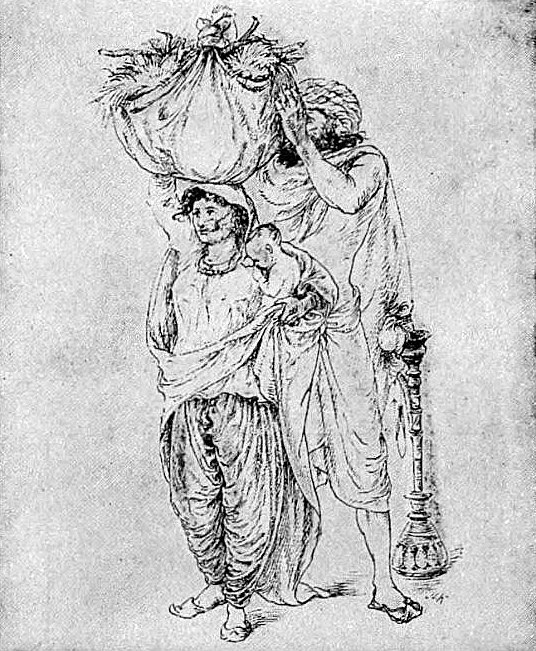
Mahommedan Jat cultivators. Wife:—with izār, kurta, and orhni or chadar; husband:—with majba, chadar, and joridar pagri. “India,” Encyclopædia Britannica (11th ed.), 1911.

By the 19th century, along the Indus, where most Muslim Jats lived, the 'Jat' identity was more fluid. In the British colonial West Punjab and NWFP 'Jat' was became a title associated with peasantry. In Punjab, there was no strict division between 'Jat' and 'Rajput' communities. In Sindh and Makran, Jats were usually peasants or dromedary-men.

Some Muslim Jats, especially those living in and around Majha Punjab, belong to clans which are also found among Sikh and Hindu Jats in India, such as the Chatthas, Gondals, Sandhus, and Waraich.

=== British Punjab ===
As per the 1921 census, 47.3% of the Jats followed Islam in British Punjab, as compared to 33% who were Sikhs and 19% who were Hindus. In the 1931 census, the total Muslim Jat population was 2,941,395 (out of British Punjab's total population of 28,490,857).

The former Punjab Province of British India extended beyond the borders of present-day Punjab in both Pakistan and India, encompassing regions that are now parts of the modern-day Indian states of Haryana, Himachal Pradesh, Delhi, Chandigarh and Jammu and Kashmir, in addition to today's Punjab.

=== Pakistan and India ===
In modern times, Pakistani Jat maintain clan identity through the biradri system, and it plays an important role in politics in the country. This system is also influential among British Pakistani Jats.

In 1988, Sukhbir Singh estimated the total Muslim Jat population to be around 13 million in Pakistan and 240,000 in India. He extrapolated these numbers from older British censuses, and factored in the natural population growth in both countries. In terms of percentages by religious affiliation, Sukhbir Singh also wrote that Jat Muslims form the largest subgroup, amounting to 42% of all Jats in the Indian subcontinent, followed by Hindus (33%) and Sikhs (25%).

In 2009, the Pakistani Jat population was estimated to be roughly 21 million. The Jats, together with Rajputs and Gujjars, are the dominant Punjabi Muslim communities settled across eastern Pakistan.

== Notable people ==
Naseer Ahmad Malhi

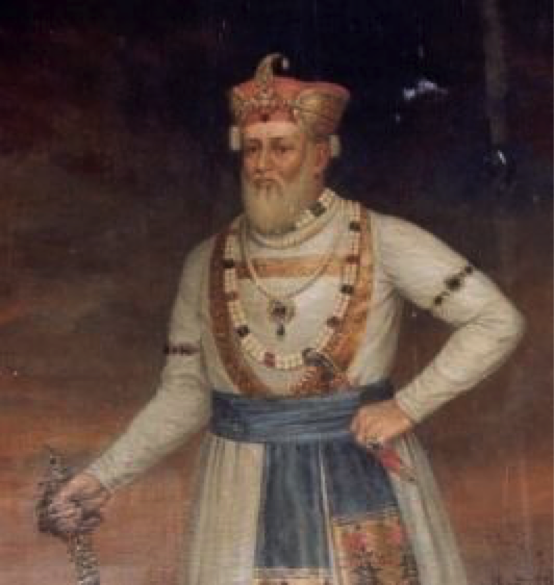
Portrait of Faizullah Khan, the founder of Rampur State

- Saadullah Khan, Mughal period scholar and grand vizier
- Muzaffar Jang Hidayat, Nizam of Hyderabad
- Ali Mohammed Khan, founder of the kingdom of Rohilkhand
- Faizullah Khan, founder of the princely state of Rampur
- Hafiz Barkhurdar, Sufi saint, Punjabi poet and religious scholar
- Chitu Khan, a pindari chief who fought in the Third Anglo-Maratha war
- Pir Muhammad Chattha, Chattha chief
- Qadir Yar, Punjabi poet, court poet of the Lahore Durbar
- Mohammed Rafi, Indian playback singer, recipient of the Padma Shri award
- Muhammad Arif Nakai, Pakistani politician
- Amir Sultan Tarar, Pakistani spymaster during Soviet-Afghan war
- Qamar Javed Bajwa, tenth Chief of Army Staff of the Pakistani Armed Forces
- Zaheer Ahmad Babar Sidhu, sixteenth Chief of Air Staff of the Pakistani Air Force
- Chaudhary Naseer Ahmed Abbas, Pakistani politician
- Naseer Ahmad Malhi, a Pakistan Movement activist and first Minister of Education of West Pakistan

== See also ==
- List of Jats
