= Mashhad of Sayyida Ruqayya =

Religious building in Cairo, Egypt

- مَشْهَد ٱلسَّيِّدَة رُقَيَّة
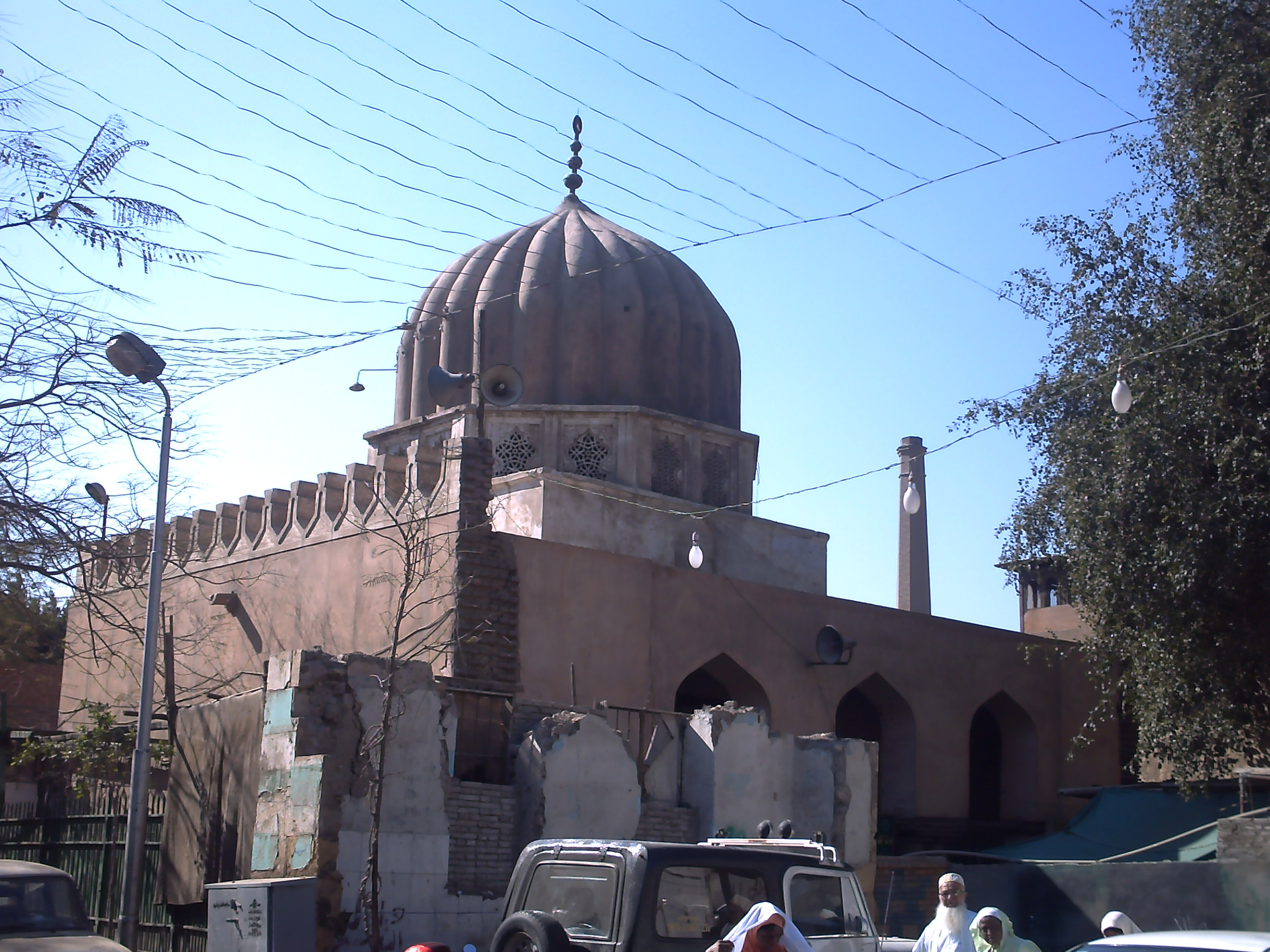

Religion
- Affiliation: Islam
- Ecclesiastical or organisational status: Mashhad; Mausoleum; Mosque/oratory
- Status: Active

Location
- Location: Al Abageyah, El-Khalifa, Cairo
- Country: Egypt
- Interactive map of Mashhad of Sayyida Ruqayya
- Coordinates: 30°01′32″N 31°15′7″E

Architecture
- Style: Fatimid; Islamic
- Completed: 1133 CE; 2015 (renovations)
- Dome: 1

The Mashhad of Sayyida Ruqayya (Arabic: مَشْهَد ٱلسَّيِّدَة رُقَيَّة, romanized: Mashhad as-Sayyida Ruqayya), sometimes referred to as the Mausoleum or Tomb of Sayyida Ruqayya, is a 12th-century Islamic religious shrine and mosque in Cairo, Egypt. It was erected in 1133 CE as a memorial to Ruqayya bint Ali (also known as Sayyida Ruqayya), a member of the Islamic prophet Muhammad's family. It is also notable as one of the few and most important Fatimid-era mausoleums preserved in Cairo today.

Although the shrine is designed like a tomb, Ruqqaya bint Ali herself is most likely not buried here, as other historical sources report that she was buried in Damascus. In Pakistan, it is believed that her mausoleum is Bibi Pak Daman, located in Lahore.

== History ==
=== Context and construction ===
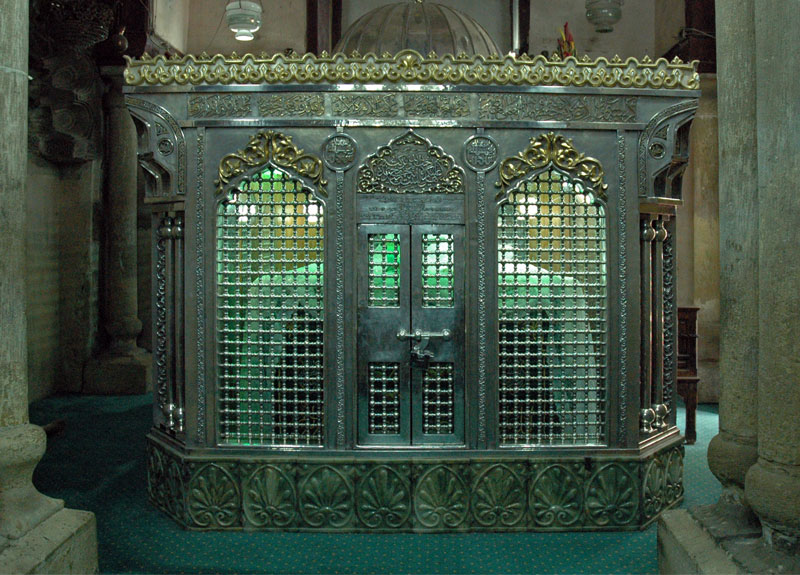
The zarih of Sayyida Ruqayya.

Sayyida Ruqayya was a daughter of Ali ibn Abi Talib, her mother being one of the wives of Ali (who also married Muhammad's daughter Fatimah). Along with Sayyida Nafisah, who is buried in a nearby mosque, she is considered to be a patron saint of Cairo. Nonetheless, it is not clear that Sayyida Ruqayya ever came to Egypt or that she is actually buried here. One tradition holds that she came to Egypt with Sayyida Zaynab (also buried in an important shrine in Cairo, at the Sayyida Zaynab Mosque), just as inscriptions on the cenotaph inside this mausoleum claim that it is her tomb. However, other traditions acknowledge Damascus as her place of burial, and see this mausoleum as a mashhad ru'ya, a "visual memorial".

The origin of this shrine is attributed to the Fatimid caliph al-Hafiz (r. 1132–1149), who had a dream in which he encountered a woman wearing a cloak who turned out to be Sayyida Ruqayya. He then led members of his entourage to the spot where the encounter had happened in his dream, where they dug and found an unknown tomb. Al-Hafiz then ordered that a mashhad for Sayyida Ruqayya be built on this spot. The mausoleum's construction is dated by an inscription from 527 AH (1132/1133 CE).

The Fatimid period was the first to introduce monumental mausoleums with domes in the Islamic architecture of Egypt, as early Islam originally disfavoured monumental tombs. The Fatimids also introduced (or revived) traditions of visiting and spending time at the tombs of important religious saints as well as of one's own family and ancestors; a tradition that existed also in Ancient Egypt.

=== Modern use and restoration ===
The mashhad is still in use as a mosque or oratory today, where religious instruction takes places and people come to pray for the saint's intercession. The mashhad and some of the other nearby tombs have recently been restored by the heritage organisation Athar Lina. This involved repairing damage to the ancient structures and cleaning accumulated dirt and grime over the walls and stucco mihrabs. The silver zarih (shrine enclosure) inside the mausoleum is also a relatively recent gift from the Dawoodi Bohra.

== Architecture ==
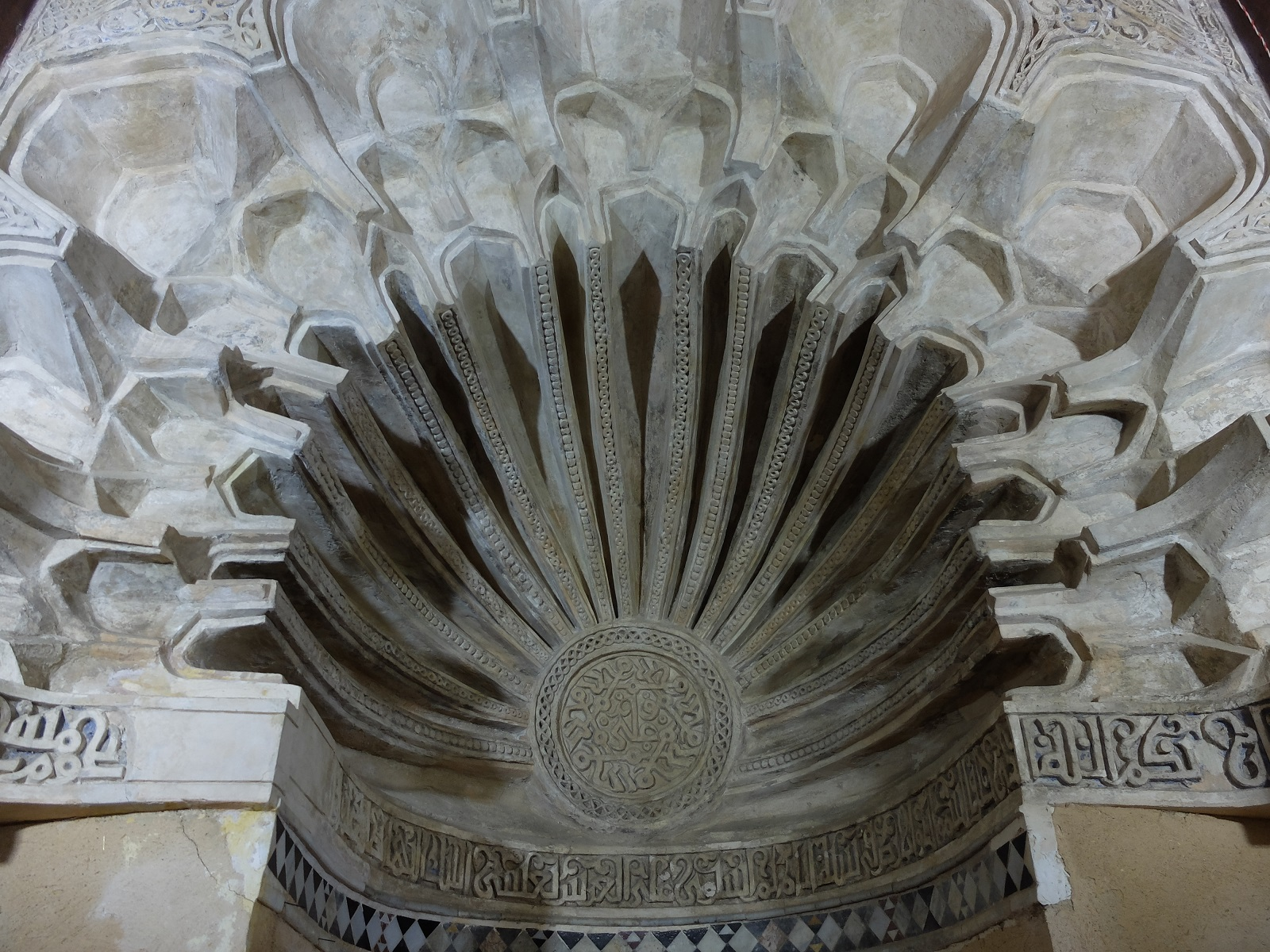
The central mihrab, carved in stucco

The Mashhad of Sayyida Ruqayya is one of the few well-preserved Fatimid buildings of its kind and represents some important features of Fatimid architecture and of later architecture in Cairo. The building bears resemblances to the Mashhad of al-Juyushi in its layout. Its entrance is preceded by triple-arched portico, as well as by two mihrabs (niches symbolizing the direction of prayer) on either side. Inside the mausoleum, the space is dominated by the shrine and cenotaph, but of great architectural significance are three more mihrabs. The central mihrab is an exceptionally fine work of stucco decoration. It is often considered a masterpiece of stucco carving in Egypt's architectural history. The overall design of the mihrab is reminiscent of the main portal of the Fatimid-era Aqmar Mosque, but elaborates it further and arguably represents a culmination of this design. Like the other two mihrabs, it consists of a "keel"-shaped niche with radiating ribs, beyond which are elaborate arabesque and calligraphic carvings. At the center of the niche is a medallion that contains the name "'Ali" surrounded by five iterations of the name "Muhammad" linked together.

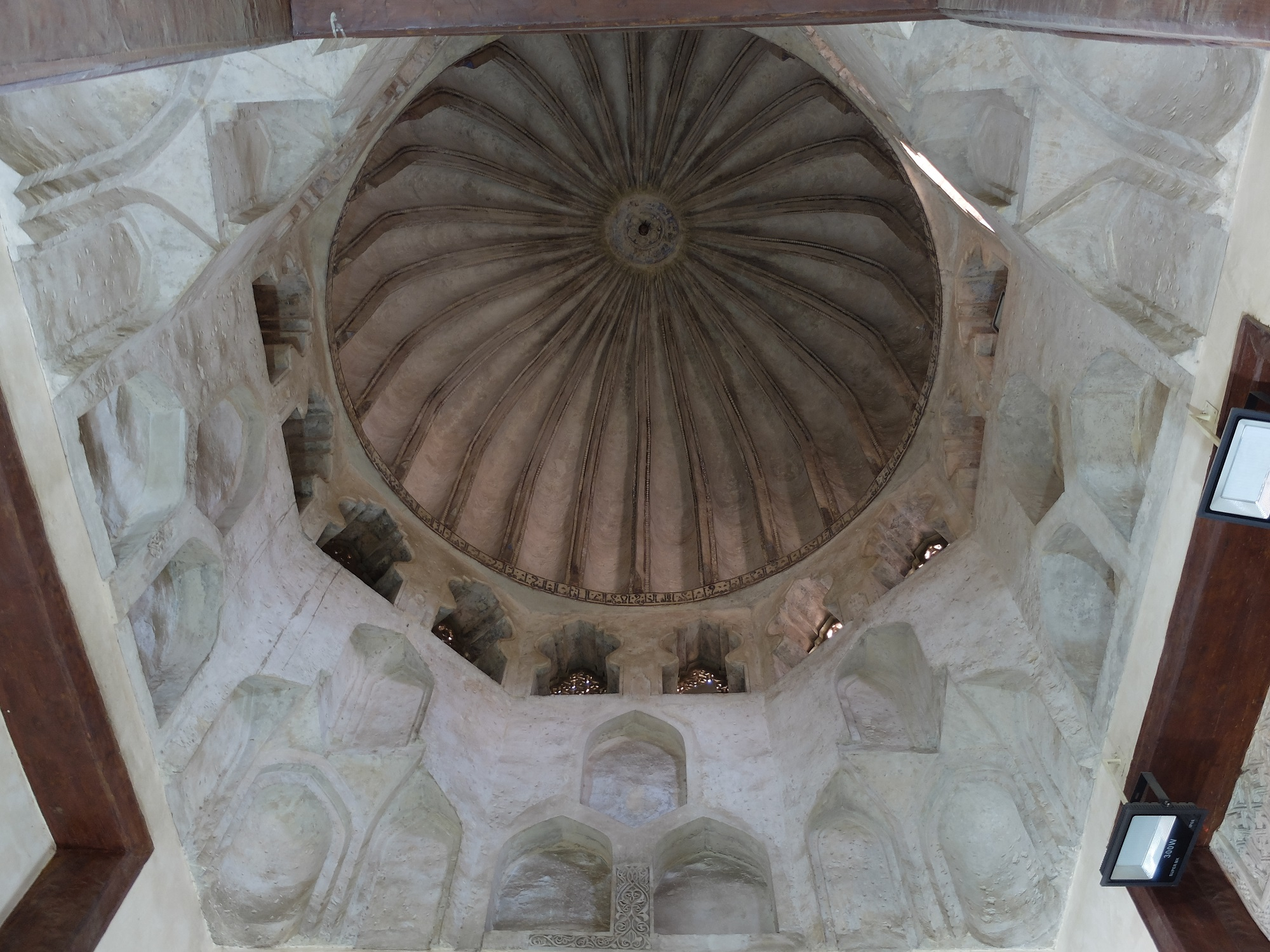
Interior of the dome over the shrine, with tiered squinches

The dome is fluted (ribbed) and pointed, with an octagonal drum or base. On the inside, the transition from the octagonal base of the dome to the rest of the square chamber is achieved through a series of superimposed niches acting as squinches and giving the vague impression of muqarnas (stalactite-like) forms. These foreshadowed the more elaborate muqarnas pendentives that would increasingly be used in later Islamic architecture in Cairo. The drum of the dome also is pierced with ornate lobed windows with stucco grilles, a rare form for such windows that is only seen again in the windows of the much later Sinan Pasha Mosque.

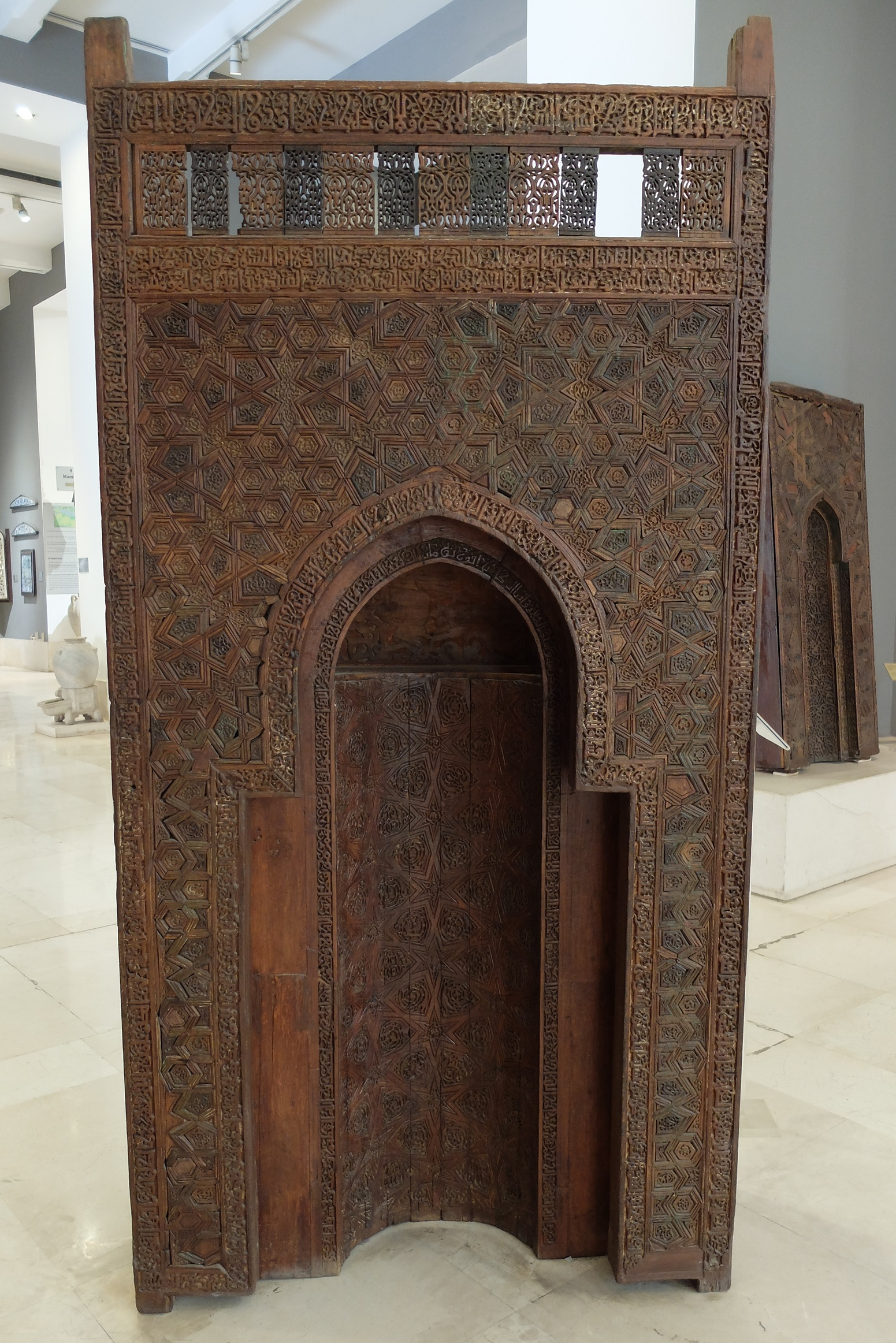
The wooden mihrab, dating from 1154 to 1160, which was once used for the Mashhad of Sayyida Ruqayya. Now on display at the Museum of Islamic Art, Cairo.

The silver zarih (shrine or tomb enclosure) surrounding the cenotaph is a more recent donation from the Dawoodi Bohra, spiritual descendants of the Fatimids. It replaced a richly-crafted wooden zarih that stood there before and originally came from the nearby shrine of Sayyida Nafisa. The mashhad also housed a freestanding wooden mihrab which is considered one of the finest examples of its kind from the Fatimid period. The mihrab is now on display at the Museum of Islamic Art in Cairo. It may have originally been used in the courtyard of the mashhad and/or for special occasions.

== Location and environment ==
The mausoleum is located along a street leading across the al-Khalifa area (also referred to as the Sayyida Nafisa Cemetery) which is part of the wider Qarafa Necropolis of Cairo. Along the street is a concentration of important mausoleums from different periods, including those of Egypt's only female ruler since Cleopatra, Shajar ad-Durr, and of the Mamluk Sultan Al-Ashraf Khalil. More importantly, from a religious point of view, is the mosque and mausoleum of Sayyida Nafisa (granddaughter of Hasan, grandson of Muhammad, and buried here in 824 CE) and the mosque and mausoleum of Sayyida Sukayna (also known as Ruqayya), a daughter of Husayn (brother of Hasan). Sayyida Nafisa's life in Egypt is better-documented but Sayyida Sukayna's tomb here is apocryphal as she is believed to be buried in either Damascus or Medina. Right next to the mausoleum of Sayyida Ruqayya are a pair of modest domed tombs, also Fatimid in origin, which are attributed to Sayyida 'Atika (believed to be an aunt of Muhammad) and to Muhammad al-Ja'fari (son of Ja'far al-Sadiq, the sixth Shi'i Imam). With so many tombs associated to the family of Muhammad and of 'Ali, the area had notable religious importance for the Isma'ili Shi'a Fatimid dynasty, who built many of the original mausoleums here in their day.

== See also ==
- Islam in Egypt
- List of mausoleums in Egypt
- Ruqayya bint Husayn
- High medieval domes
