= Portable mihrab from the Mashhad of Sayyida Ruqayya =

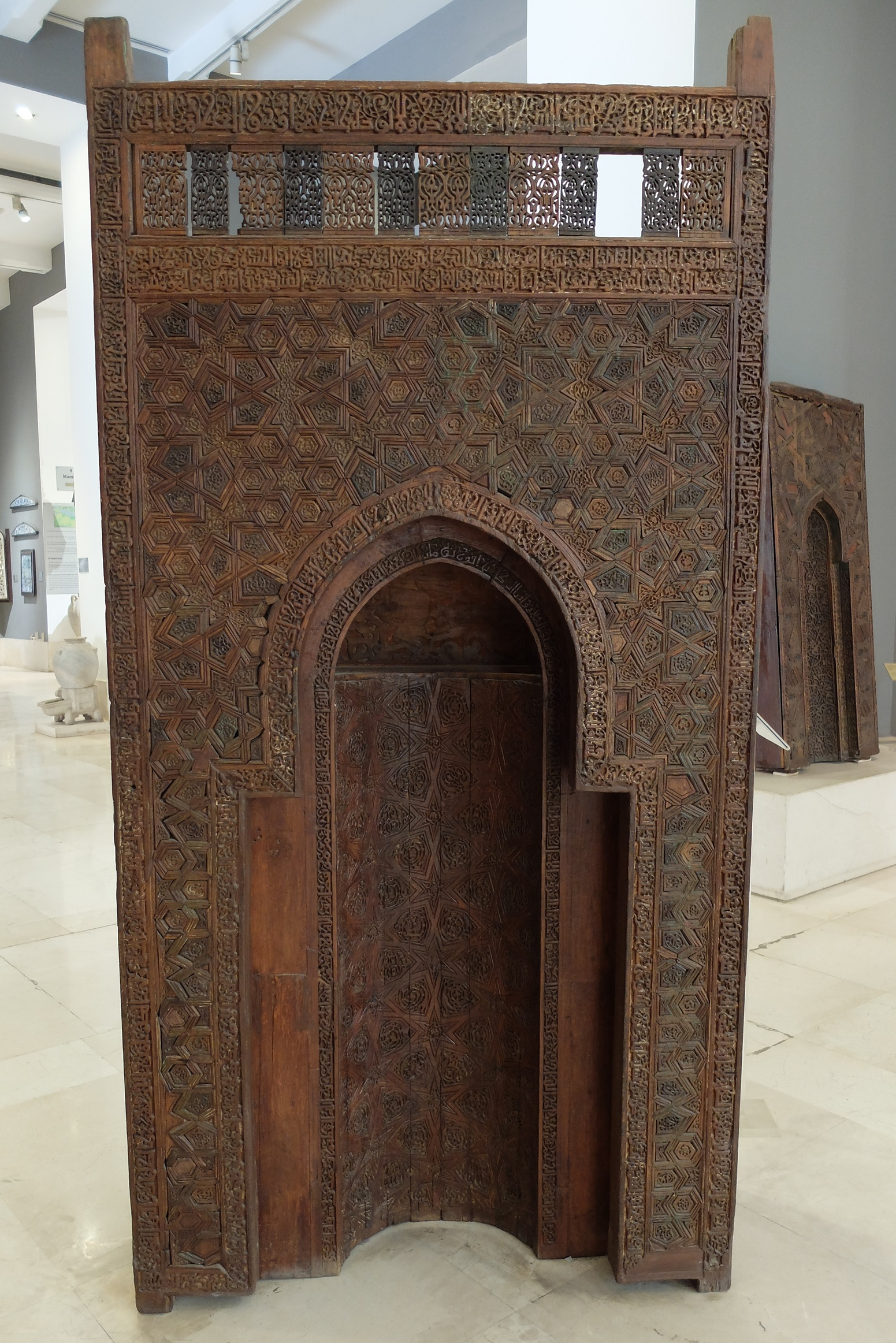
The front of the portable wooden mihrab from the Mashhad of Sayyida Ruqayya (now housed at the Museum of Islamic Art, Cairo). From the bottom of the image to the top, this view shows the niche and the intricately carved star-shaped geometric motif as well as the two lines of inscription that date the mihrab.

The portable mihrab from the Mashhad of Sayyida Ruqayya dates to the Fatimid period and is crafted entirely from wood. It is notable both because of its wooden construction and because it is not built into a larger permanent structure but is freestanding and can be moved. It was commissioned by al-Sayyida 'Ulam al-Amiriyya, the wife of the Fatimid caliph al-Amir, in the 12th century. The mihrab currently resides in the Museum of Islamic Art in Cairo, Egypt.

The basic structure of the mihrab, which stands 210 centimetres (83 in) tall, 111 centimetres (44 in) wide, and 45 centimetres (18 in) deep, is a rectangular prism with a niche on its front. The perimeter of the façade includes Qur'anic verses. The surface of the mihrab contains foliated and geometric patterns, among vegetal designs.

== Dating ==
An inscription near the top of the mihrab records that it was commissioned by al-Sayyida 'Ulam al-Amiriyya (d. 1140), the wife of the Fatimid caliph al-Amir bi-Ahkam Allah (r. 1101–1130), for the mashhad of Sayyida Ruqayya(dedicated to Sayyida Ruqayya, daughter of Ali). The inscription also notes that the commission was supervised by Afif al-Dawla al-Fa'izi al-Salihi, a Fatimid official. The exact date of the mihrab's construction is not recorded.

Bernard O'Kane, a scholar of Islamic art and architecture, notes that the nisbas of al-Afif al-Dawla indicate that he served the Caliph al-Fa'iz, who reigned from 1154 to 1160, and the vizier al-Salih Tala'i, who served this position from 1154 to 1161, and that the mihrab can thus be dated to sometime in the period of 1154–1160. According to Al-Sayyed Muhammad Khalifa Hammad, the inscription suggests the mihrab was created in 1133 AD, when the mashhad was constructed.

== Fatimid period woodwork ==
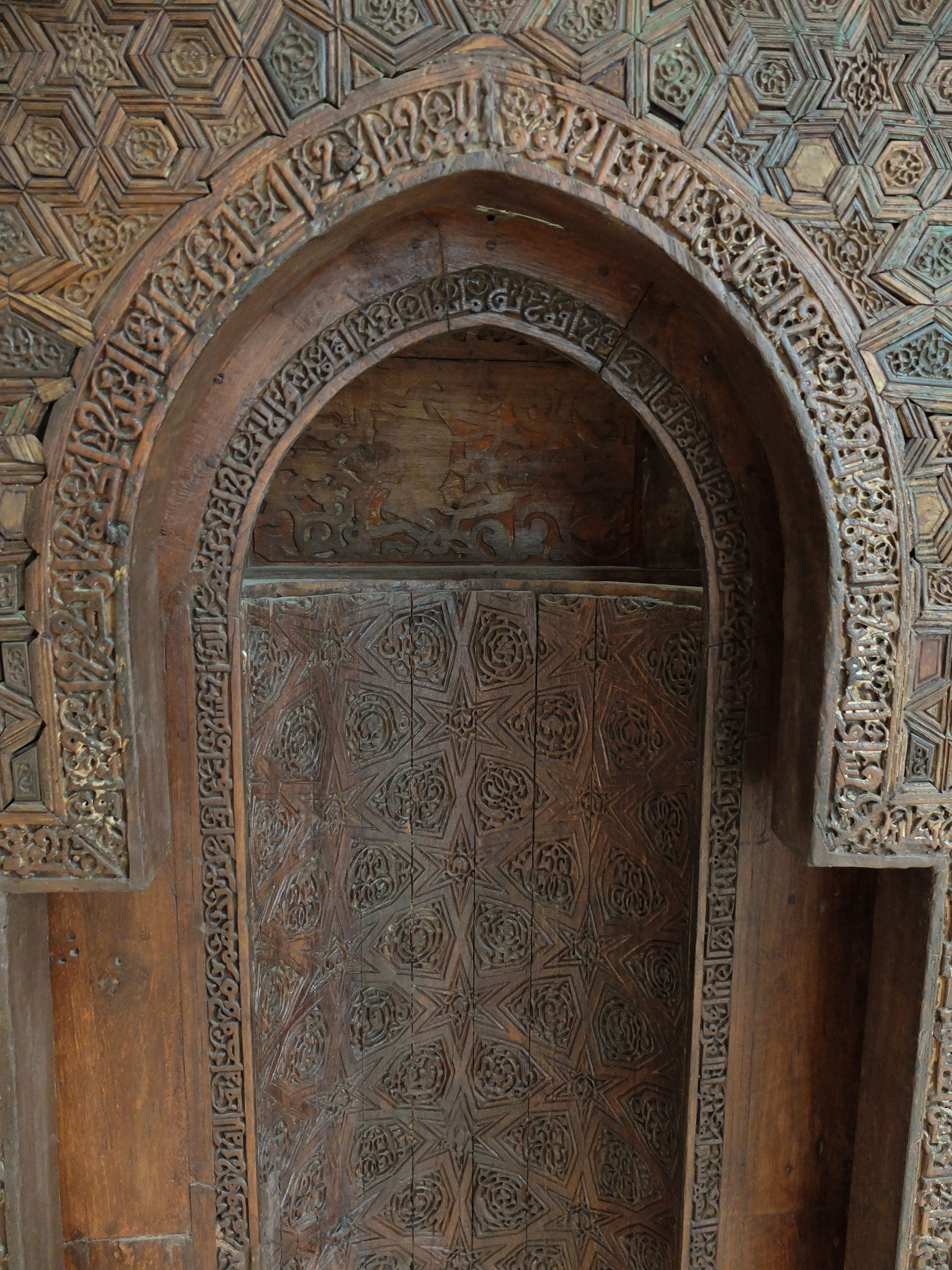
Detail of the mihrab's niche

The Fatimid dynasty is associated with a period of great economic expansion, marked by lavish decorative arts and architecture within the Islamic world. Significant development in woodwork, among other arts, contributed to a growth in distinct and intricate wood carvings on doors, panels, mihrabs, caskets, and other structures. Additionally, Fatimid woodwork frequently depicted scenes of entertainment and court life. Typical design elements seen in Fatimid woodwork were derived from Byzantine and Coptic art such as vines, vegetal and floral patterns, repetitive panel arrangement, and figural representation of both humans and animals. These figural depictions were often framed by foliated scrolls, calligraphic inscriptions, or geometric designs.

Because wood was a scarce material in Egypt, the intricate Fatimid woodworks represented an elite artistic standard. The types of wood used for these objects, such as acacia, box, cedar, cypress, and teak, would have been imported.

== Decoration ==
=== Motifs ===
The portable mihrab is carved with both geometric and vegetal designs. The carvings on the sides are shallow in contrast to the deeper carvings on the front façade, creating the impression of protrusion. Both the niche and most of the façade around it are carved with a polygonal pattern based on the form of six-pointed stars. This the earliest datable example of the star-shaped medallion as a significant decorative motif of Islamic woodworks. This pattern radiates from a central star, surrounded by hexagonal or pentagonal shapes. When observed from a distance, it forms a symmetrical composition. Arabesques intricately engraved at the center of each star and in the spaces between the bands of the geometric pattern, adding an additional layer of detail. The lateral surfaces of the mihrab are decorated with panels carved with organic designs: vine arabesques, flowers, and vegetal stems rising from vases that form cornucopias. A band of arabesque openwork is also present between Kufic inscriptions at the top of the mihrab.

=== Inscriptions ===
Both the central niche and the perimeter of the surrounding façade are framed with lines of Arabic inscriptions in a floriated Kufic script. The inscriptions include Qur'anic excerpts from al-Baqara (Quran 2: 247).

Another band of foliated Kufic at the top of the façade, below the openwork, forms an inscription with two lines. The inscription reads: "One of the things commissioned by the honorable, protected, and great personage, al-Amiriyya, whose service was undertaken by al-Qadi Abu al-Hasan Maknun and who is served now, by al-Amir al-Sadid 'Afif al-Dawla Abu al-Hasan Yumn al-Fa'izi al-Salihi, intended for the shrine of al-Sayyida Ruqayya, the daughter of the Commander of the Faithful, 'Ali."

== Functions of portability ==
The Mashhad of Sayyida Ruqayya, which originally housed this portable mihrab, also has five other permanent stucco mihrabs. Scholar Doris Behrens-Abouseif, noting that the portable mihrab is also decorated on its back, speculates that it could have been transported and used outside for certain occasions.

== Other portable mihrabs ==
Detail from another portable mihrab found in the Sayyida Nafisa Mosque, similar to the portable mihrab from the Mashhad of Sayyida Ruqayya (Museum of Islamic Art, Cairo)

There is a separate portable mihrab of similar construction and design that belonged to the al-Sayyida Nafisa Mosque. It was most likely commissioned by al-Amir's successor, al-Hafiz, during his renovations of that mosque in either 1137–8 or 1146–7. Both mihrabs share the motif of six-pointed stars surrounded with hexagons. The similarities in motifs between these two particular mihrabs have led scholars to suggest that both may have been worked on by the same craftsmen. The portable mihrab from the al-Sayyida Nafisa Mosque is also currently housed in the Museum of Islamic Art in Cairo.

Another portable wooden mihrab in the Museum of Islamic Art in Cairo is dated to 1125–6. It is also attributed to the patronage of Caliph al-Amir and was made for the al-Azhar Mosque. It differs from the other portable mihrabs in its decoration, which includes beveled-style motifs.
