= Al-Sayyida Nafisa Mosque =

Mosque in Cairo, Egypt

- مسجد السيدة نفيسة
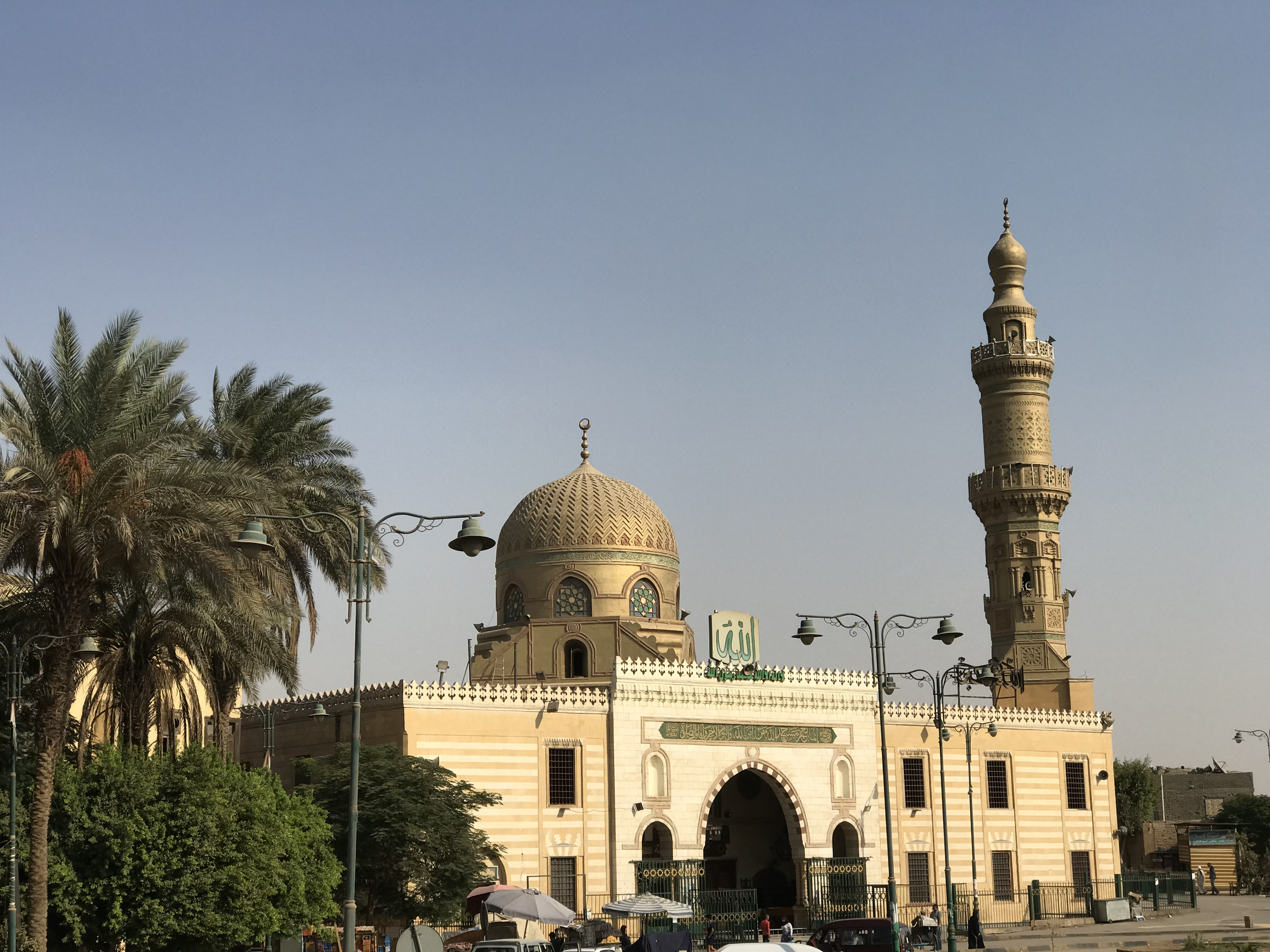

Religion
- Affiliation: Islam
- Ecclesiastical or organisational status: Mosque
- Status: Active

Location
- Location: Northern Cemetery, Islamic Cairo
- Country: Egypt
- Interactive map of Al-Sayyida Nafisa Mosque
- Coordinates: 30°01′21″N 31°15′08″E

Architecture
- Type: Mosque
- Style: Islamic
- Founder: Ubaydallah ibn al-Sari (9th century)
- Funded by: al-Hafiz (1138); Abd al-Rahman Katkhuda (18th century); Abbas II (1897)
- Completed: 9th century CE (original); 1138 CE (restore); 18th century (restore); 1897 (rebuild)

Specifications
- Dome: 1
- Minaret: 1

Al-Sayyida Nafisa Mosque is a mosque located in the al-Sayyida Nafisa district (or Sebaa Valley), a section of the larger historic necropolis called al-Qarafa (or Northern Cemetery) in Islamic Cairo, Egypt. It was built in the 9th century CE by the then emir Ubaydallah to commemorate Sayyida Nafisa, an Islamic saint and member of the family of the Islamic prophet Muhammad. She was the great-granddaughter of Hasan, one of the prophet Muhammad's two grandsons. The mosque contains her mausoleum, also known as a mashhad. Along with the necropolis around it, the mosque is listed as part of the UNESCO World Heritage Site of Islamic Cairo. The mosque and mausoleum has been rebuilt many times since the 9th century.

== History ==
Sayyida Nafisa is considered holy as a member of the Prophet’s family and her piety earned her the special status of an Islamic saint. She emigrated from Hejaz to Egypt and eventually settled in Fustat where she had a reputation for performing miracles. Before her death in 824 CE, she made the hajj, or pilgrimage to Mecca, thirty times. She was renowned as a huffaza, meaning she knew the Qur'an by heart. Before she died, she reportedly dug her own grave and sat in it while she recited the whole of the Qur’an 190 times, saying "Rahma" ("mercy") with her last gasp. After her death, the people of al-Fustat begged her husband not to take her body back to Medina, but rather to bury it in al-Fustat because of her baraka, or her blessing and grace from God.

=== History of the mosque ===
Sayyida Nafisa was likely first buried in her own house, following early Islamic practice. A mausoleum was built over the site later. The 14th-century historian al-Maqrizi reports that the first mausoleum's construction is attributed to Ubaydallah ibn al-Sari, the Abbasid governor of Egypt between 821 and 827.

The mausoleum's religious importance developed mainly during the Fatimid period (10th to 12th centuries). The next references to it date from the time of Badr al-Jamali, the Fatimid vizier who held power in the late 11th century. He is said to have restored a door or gate of the compound in 1089. Art historian Caroline Williams notes that there is a decorative "cresting in the form of a chain of inverted Y's" on the north wall of the funerary complex which most likely dates from this restoration. In 1138, the Fatimid caliph al-Hafiz initiated another restoration that included a renovation of the dome over the tomb and a marble lining for the mihrab.

Under the Mamluk Sultanate, the Mamluk authorities gave management of the mosque and mausoleum to the Abbasid caliphs in Cairo who held a more cultural and ceremonial position under the Sultanate. Some sources indicate the management began in 1362 under Caliph al-Mutawakkil I. Regardless, this decision helped bolster the royal family's financial well-being and prestige among the people of Cairo. The mausoleum's religious importance gave the Abbasids in Cairo a symbolic connection with Ali and Fatima due to their family relations. Funerals and donations were made by visitors in exchange for an Abbasid or Nafisa blessing. Abbasid management of the mosque was briefly taken away from Caliph al-Mutawakkil I for around 1364–1365 CE two decades until it was given back to the Abbasids. The family continued their management of the mosque and its visits until the Ottoman capture of Cairo in 1517 CE.

=== Modern era ===
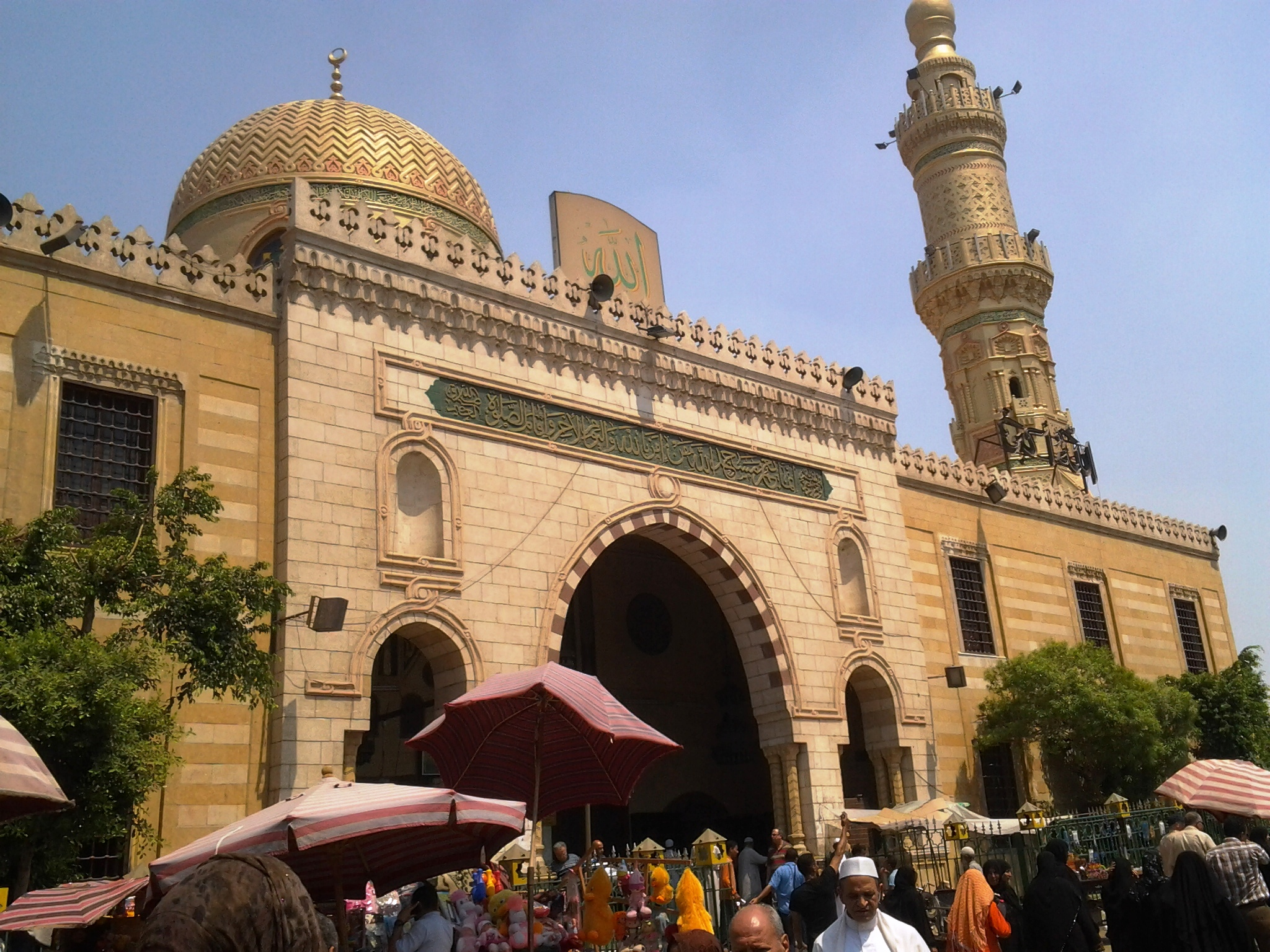
The mosque in 2012

The present-day mosque and shrine was rebuilt in the Ottoman period by Abd al-Rahman Katkhuda, one of the most powerful political figures in Egypt during the 18th century. The mosque was restored again in 1897 under Khedive Abbas II, following damage caused by a fire. The mosque was expanded in the late 1980s and again in the late 1990s, in part to make more space for the religious teaching activities that were increasingly hosted here.

A new zarih over the tomb was inaugurated during the visit of the leader of the Dawoodi Bohras in June 2021. In the late summer of 2023, the mosque underwent a controversial renovation sponsored by the Indian Bohra community, culminating in a visit by President Abdel Fattah El-Sisi to mark its completion. The interior had previously held a Mamluk aesthetic but that has been covered with Asian-styled marble. Parts of the interior façade of the building were moved to the mausoleum of Ibn Ata Allah al-Iskandari during the renovation.

== Location ==
Sayyida Nafisa Mosque is located at the border between al-Qata'i from al-Askar. The location of Sayyida Nafisa’s tomb is believed to have been the location of her house. It is set on al-Khalifa street, where numerous mausoleums commemorating well known Islamic figures exist along the way. After she died, many people were buried near her to benefit from her baraka, or blessing. In addition to the mosque and mausoleum of Sayyida Nafisa, the street is also the location of the mausoleums of Sayyida Sakinah bint Husayn, Sayyida Ruqayya bint Ali, Sayyid Muhammad ibn Jafar al-Sadiq, and Sayyida 'Atikah, believed to be an aunt of Muhammad. This necropolis was originally built in the period of the Fatimids, when many commemorative mosques and Mashhads were constructed to honor religious subjects that were holy to the entire community, rather than a singular person. Most of these tombs and shrines were sacred to the memory of the Prophet’s family, including Sayyida Nafisa.

== Portable mihrab ==
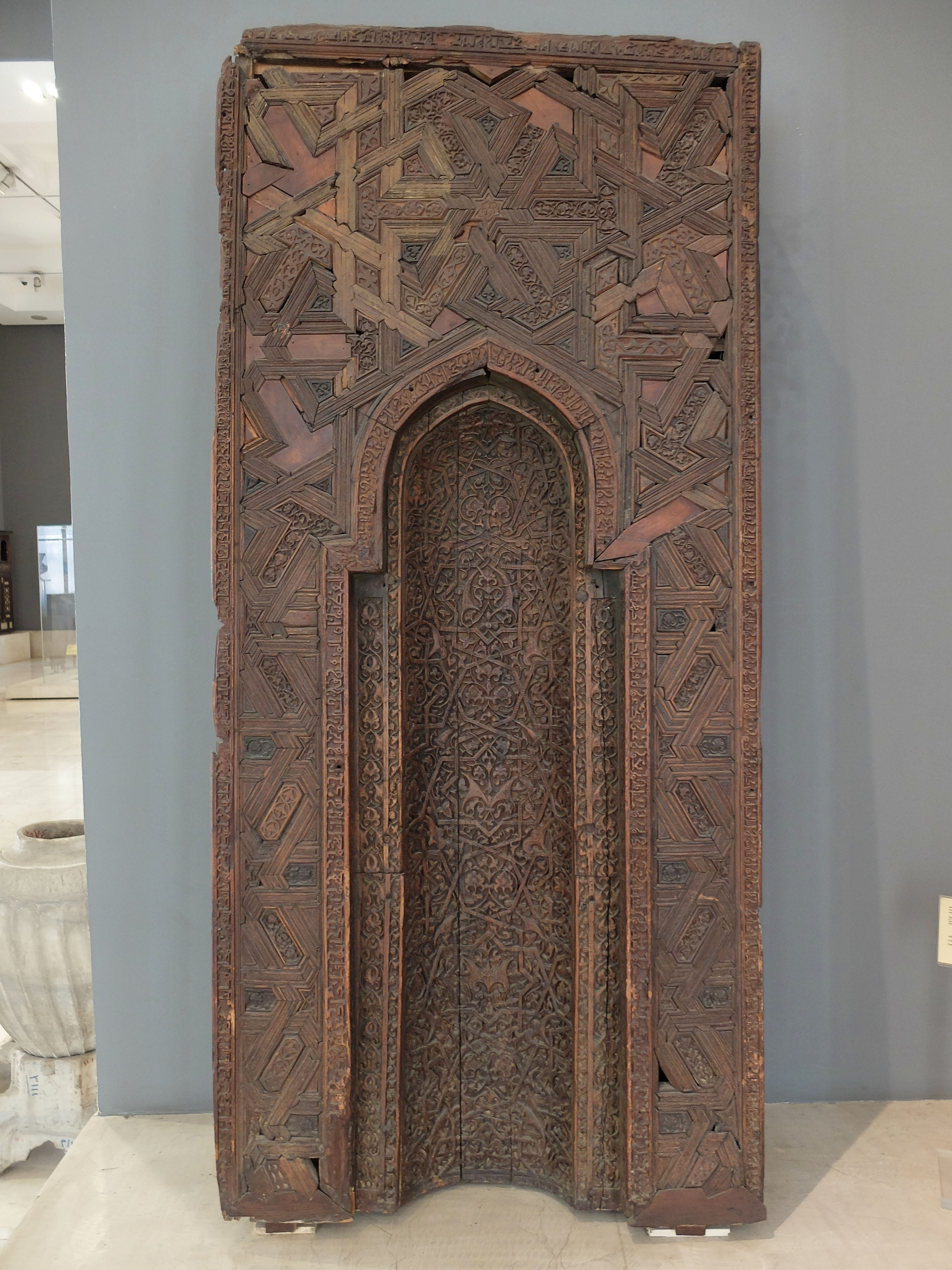
Portable wooden mihrab from the Sayyida Nafisa Mosque, dated to the 12th century, now kept at the Museum of Islamic Art in Cairo

One of the only Fatimid-era remnants from the mosque is a piece of woodwork now preserved at the Museum of Islamic Art in Cairo. It was most likely commissioned by Caliph al-Hafiz during his renovations of that mosque in either 1137–1138 or 1146–1147. It is similar in design to another Fatimid-era portable mihrab that came from the Mashhad of Sayyida Ruqayya. It is shaped like a niche with a pointed arch. The outer façade of the mihrab is decorated with an early version of an Islamic geometric motif featuring polygonal forms around a six-pointed star, with a foliate arabesque motif carved in between the lines of the polygons. The central niche is deeply carved with another foliate arabesque motif and a less prominent geometric motif with eight-pointed stars.

== See also ==
- Islam in Egypt
- List of mausoleums in Cairo
- List of mosques in Cairo
- High medieval domes
