= Muhammad ibn Uthman =

Zutt Tribal Chief

Muhammad bin Uthman محمد بن عثمان
- Born: unknown Iraq, Abbasid Caliphate
- Died: late 9th Century Iraq, Abbasid Caliphate
- Allegiance: Zutt tribe
- Conflicts: Zutt Rebellion

Muhammad bin Uthman was a rebel leader who played a key role in the Zutt Rebellion, which took place in Iraq in the early 9th century CE. He was born into a family of the Zutt tribe who had settled in the region around Basra, and he rose to prominence as a military commander and political figure during the reign of Caliph al-Ma'mun.

== Personality ==
Muhammad bin Uthman

was known for his charisma, his military skill, and his ability to rally support from diverse groups of people. He was a devout Sunni Muslim and a strong advocate for social justice, and he saw the Zutt rebellion as a way to challenge the corruption and oppression that he perceived in the Abbasid government.[citation needed]

== Rise to Power ==
Under Muhammad bin Uthman's leadership, the Zutt rebels captured several key cities in southern Iraq, including Basra, Wasit, and Hira and also Al-Jazira (caliphal province).

Despite their early successes, the Zutt rebels were ultimately unable to overcome the military might of the Abbasid government, and the rebellion was crushed in the year 835 CE. The tribe would be dispersed throughout the Caliphate to prevent another rebellion. Muhammad bin Uthman would still retain chief position of his tribe.

== Impact ==
Although the Zutt rebellion was ultimately unsuccessful, it had a significant impact on the political and social landscape of Iraq in the early Abbasid period. It highlighted the deep-seated grievances and tensions that existed between different groups in Iraqi society, and it served as a reminder of the challenges and complexities of governing a diverse and fractious empire.

== See also ==
- Zutt Rebellion
