= Zutt Rebellion =

Ninth-century slave revolt in Iraq

- Map of Iraq in the later 9th century. Zutt primarily inhabited the marshland in lower Iraq.
Date	810–835
Location	Iraq, Abbasid Caliphate

Belligerents
Zutt	Abbasid Caliphate

Commanders and leaders
Yusuf ibn Zutt; Muhammad Ibn Uthman; Samlaq	al-Ma'mun al-Mu'tasim; Ujayf ibn Anbasa; Isa ibn Yazid al-Juludi; Al-Jarrah bin 'Abdallah †; Abdallah bin Mu'awiya †

The Zutt Rebellion was a rebellion by the Zutts, originally inhabitants of the lower Indus Valley (roughly Pakistan), between 810 and 835 in Iraq during the reign of al-Ma'mun and continued to the era of al-Mu'tasim.

== Naval raids ==
Mu'tasim's army employed similarly meticulous tactics to suppress a Zutt rebellion in southern Iraq. However, the new Turkish troops were not involved, as their strategies were ill-suited for the marshes and densely cultivated palm groves. Instead, other forces blocked off hundreds of reedy canals used by the Zutt for raids in small boats, and then methodically advanced into rebel-held territory.

== Zutt colonization of Khuzestan ==
The Zutt colonization of Khuzestan refers to the migration and settlement of the Zutt people Muslim communities originally from the Indus Valley region of modern day Pakistan in the marshlands of southwestern Iran during the late Sasanian and early Islamic periods. They established agricultural communities and irrigation infrastructure in Khuzestan. After the suppression of the Zutt rebellion in southern Iraq, many were relocated to Bahrain, where they continued similar activities.

== Capture of Wasit ==
The Capture of Wasit was an important moment in the Zutt Rebellion. The Zutt, using their dominance over the marshlands and waterways between Wasit and Basra, launched a coordinated attack on Wasit. Their intimate knowledge of the terrain and reliance on guerrilla tactics enabled them to overwhelm Abbasid defenses and seize control of the city.

The Abbasid forces, commanded by Al-Mu'tasim, suffered heavy casualties as they struggled to counter the Zutt's ambushes in the marshes. The fall of Wasit allowed the Zutt to establish temporary rule over the city and destabilized Abbasid authority in the region.

== External sources ==
- Houtsma, M. Th. (1993). E. J. Brill's first encyclopaedia of Islam, 1913–1936, Volume 4. Brill Page 901 & 1030.
- Kennedy, H. (2004). The Prophet and the Age of the Caliphates: The Islamic Near East from the 6th to the 11th Century (2nd Edition). Routledge.
- Lewis, B. (1991). The Political Language of Islam. University of Chicago Press.
- Marozzi, J. (2004). The Way of Herodotus: Travels with the Man who Invented History. Da Capo Press.
- The History of Al-Tabari Vol. 33, Page 7
- Outlines of Islamic History From the Rise of Islam to the Fall of Baghdād By Mafizullah Kabir. Page 14, Page 218
- A Short History of Iraq(2014) By Thabit Abdullah
- Warfare in the Dark Ages By Kelly DeVries
- The [European] Other in Medieval Arabic Literature and Culture Ninth-Twelfth Century AD(2012) By Nizar F. Hermes
- Arab-Byzantine Relations in Early Islamic Times(2004) Page 172
- Al-Tabari's "History of the Prophets and Kings"
- Al-Masudi's "The Meadows of Gold and Mines of Gems"
- Ibn Khaldun's "The Muqaddimah
