= Sulayman ibn Ghalib al-Bajali =

Sulayman ibn Ghalib ibn Jibril al-Bajali (Arabic: سليمان بن غالب بن جبريل البجلي) was a governor of Egypt for the Abbasid Caliphate, from 816 to 817.

== Career ==
Sulayman was a grandson of Jibril ibn Yahya al-Bajali, a Khurasani who had likely participated in the Abbasid Revolution. He was appointed to the head of the Egyptian shurta in 809 and 811 before being propelled to the governorship on the back of a troop mutiny which resulted in the deposition of al-Sari ibn al-Hakam in September 816. He did not remain in office for long before the troops turned on him as well, and he was forced aside in February 817 after a tenure of five months, while al-Sari was returned to power.

Sulayman's son Muhammad later acted as a head of the shurta in 851.

== Notes ==
Preceded by al-Sari ibn al-Hakam	Governor of Egypt; 816–817	Succeeded by al-Sari ibn al-Hakam
