= Sayyida Nafisa =

Muslim scholar (d. 830 CE)

Nafīsah bint Al-Ḥasan
- نَفِيْسَة بِنْت ٱلْحَسَن
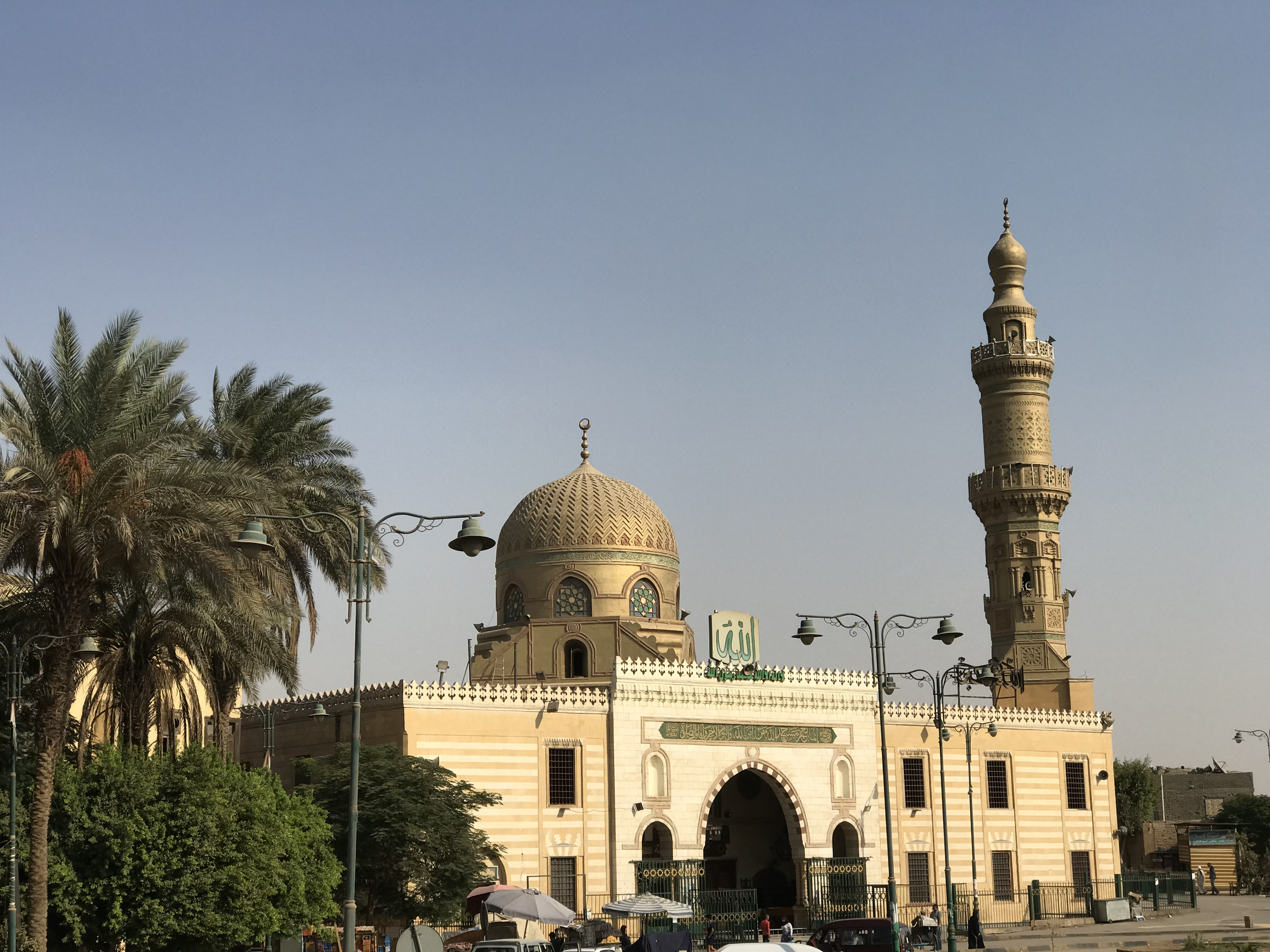
- Al-Sayeda Nafeesah Mosque in Cairo, Egypt
- Title: As-Sayyidah (ٱلسَّيِّدَة); Aṭ-Ṭāhirah (ٱلطَّاهِرَة)

Personal life
- Born: Nafisah; 762 ACE, 145 AH Mecca, Hejaz, the Arabian Peninsula, Asia
- Died: 824 CE, 208 AH Cairo, Egypt
- Resting place: Cairo
- Spouse: Is-ḥāq al-Muʾtamin
- Children: Qāsim (son); Umm Kulthūm (daughter)
- Parents: Al-Ḥasan al-Anwar ibn Zayd al-Ablaj ibn Al-Hasan ibn ʿAlī ibn Abī Ṭālib (father); Zaynab bint Al-Hasan ibn Al-Hasan ibn ʿAlī ibn Abī Ṭālib (mother)
- Era: Abbasid era
- Region: Egypt, Northeast Africa
- Occupation: Islamic scholar

Religious life
- Religion: Islam
- Lineage: Banu Hashim

Muslim leader
- Influenced by: Imam Ja'far al-Sadiq
- Influenced: Imam Muhammad ibn Idris al-Shafi'i

Sayyida Nafisa (Arabic: ٱلسَّيِّدَة نَفِيْسَة; d. 208 AH / 830 CE), (Note: Full name: As-Sayyidah Nafīsah bint Amīr al-Muʾminīn Al-Ḥasan al-Anwar ibn Zayd al-Ablaj ibn Al-Hasan ibn ʿAlī ibn Abī Ṭālib al-ʿAlawiyyah al-Ḥasaniyyah (Arabic: ٱلسَّيِّدَة نَفِيْسَة بِنْت أَمِيْر ٱلْمُؤْمِنِيْن ٱلْحَسَن ابْن زَيْد ٱلْأَبْلَج ابْن ٱلْحَسَن ابْن عَلِي ابْن أَبِي طَالِب ٱلْعَلَوِيَّة ٱلْحَسَنِيَّة)) was a female descendant of the Islamic prophet Muhammad, and a scholar and teacher of Islam. Having taught Sunni Imam Muhammad ibn Idris ash-Shafi'i, she is the best known female scholar of hadith in Egypt.

== Biography ==
She was born in Mecca around 762 A.D, the daughter of Al-Hasan al-Anwar, the son of Zayd al-Ablaj, the son of Al-Hasan, the grandson of Muhammad. She spent her later life in Cairo, where there is a mosque that bears her name.

=== Marriage and career ===
She married Is-ḥāq al-Muʾtamin (إِسْحَاق ٱلْمُؤْتَمِن), son of Ja'far al-Sadiq, himself a descendant of Muhammad. She emigrated with him from the Hejaz to Egypt. She had two children, a son named 'Qāsim' and a daughter named 'Umm Kulthūm'.

Her students came from faraway places, and among them was Al-Shafi'i, the man behind the Shafi'i school of Sunni fiqh. She financially sponsored his education for him. Ibn Kathir in al-Bidayah wa al-nihayah reports about her the following statement:

She was a wealthy lady, did a lot of favors to the people, especially those paralyzed, those with severe illness, and to all other ill people. She was devout, ascetic, and of abundant virtue. When Imam al-Shafi'i arrived in Egypt, she did good to him, and sometimes Shafi'i led her in prayers in Ramadan.

— Ibn Kathir

=== Influence on Imam al-Shafi'i ===
Imam al-Shafi'i was reportedly a student of another great Imam of Sunni Fiqh, Malik ibn Anas. It is said that al-Shafi'i, after coming to Cairo, called upon Nafisa to hear hadiths from her, and that it was not possible that he was without the influence of knowledge and personality of Nafisa, since he had been a frequent guest in her house, a listener of her lectures in her mosque, and as it is reported by the historians, asked for her invocation (Duʿāʾ) and sought for blessings (Barakāt) from her.

When Al-Shafi'i felt sick and afterward felt the approaching death, he immediately wrote the will in which he mentioned that Nafisa was honorably expected to read the funeral prayer (Ṣalāt al-Janāzah). After the death of the Imam, his body was carried to her house and she prayed over it. It reportedly could not be "without her popularity, fame, honor, and respect among the people."

=== Ascetic way of life and miracles ===
It is reported that Nafisa has been living an ascetic way of life. Zainab, her niece, had witnessed that her aunt ate once per three days and kept an empty basket with her, each time she wanted to eat something small, she put her hand inside and found something sent from Allah. Once being moved by the way of life led by Sayyida Nafisa, Zainab asked her aunt: "You must take care of yourself." On that, she replied "How shall I take care of myself before I reach my Lord? Ahead of me are so many barriers which no one can cross except the successful ones (al-fāʾizūn, ٱلْفَائِزُوْن)."

More than 150 miracles are attributed to Nafisa throughout her life and after death. After settling down in Cairo, there was a miracle of her curing the paralyzed daughter of a neighboring non-Muslim family. One day, the daughter was left in Nafisa's house when her mother went shopping in the marketplace. When Nafisa did her ablution before prayer, some drops of water touched the girl and she started to move. When Nafisa was praying, the daughter stood up and ran to the coming mother, who was shaken and overjoyed at the same moment. After that miracle, the whole family and other neighbors accepted Islam.

After her death, one accident had happened. Some thieves entered her mosque and took sixteen silver lamps. They wanted to escape immediately but failed to find the doors. They were trapped as if they were in a cage. The next morning, they were found and put into prison.

=== Legacy ===
Her piety was renowned to the extent that people came from far and near to seek her blessings; hagiographers recount her decision to leave Egypt due to the throngs that came to seek the blessings of Ahl al-Bayt ("People of the Household (of Muhammad)"), leaving little time for prayer. However, the pleas of the governor of Egypt, As-Sirri ibn al-Hakam, and the people for her not to leave Egypt convinced her to stay. Numerous accounts are given of the miracles she performed for those who sought her aid directly or through prayer, such as curing a blind child, intervening when the Nile did not rise one year as expected, preventing a ship from sinking, helping a poor woman who spent her life spinning wool to support her family, freeing a prisoner through her intercession, and seeing people through their difficulties.

Sayyidah Nafisah, Sayyidah Ruqayyah and Sayyidah Zaynab bint Ali are traditionally considered the patron saints of the madīnah (مَدِيْنَة, city) of Cairo. In addition, this was one of the five mashhads sponsored for female relatives of the prophet during the Fatimid caliphate. The other four shrines were devoted to Sayyid Ruqayya, Sayyid Zaynab, Umm Kulthum, and ‘Atika.
