= Kushajim =

Abū al-Fatḥ Maḥmūd ibn al-Ḥusayn ibn al-Sindī ibn Shāhak, better known as Kushajim was a 10th-century polymath associated with the Hamdanid courts in Mosul and Aleppo.

Kushajim was originally from a family from al-Sind; his grandfather al-Sindi was a notable Abbasid official during the reign of Harun al-Rashid. Kushajim was born at Ramla in Palestine, and initially lived at the court of Abdallah ibn Hamdan in Mosul, later joining that of Sayf al-Dawla in Aleppo. He also made visits to Baghdad, Egypt and Damascus. His son-in-law was al-Sanawbari. He died in 961.

== Works ==
Kushajim was a master of a number of crafts: his chosen name Kushajim (کشاجم) was said to be created from initials of skills he excelled in (katib, sha'ir, adib, jawad, and mantiq). He wrote a number of works, including:

- A Diwan, first published in Beirut in 1895;
- Kitāb Adab al-Nadīm ('The Etiquette/Art of the Boon Companion'), a work on the education and accomplishments expected of a court companion (nadīm). It also covered things such as food and cooking, music, poetry, etiquette and courtly accomplishments;
- Kitāb al-Maṣāyid wa-l-Maṭārid ('The Book of Snares and Game'), a treatise on hunting and falconry. It is considered one of the oldest surviving Arabic work on venery and falconry;
- Kitāb al-Bayzara, another work on falconry;
- Khaṣāʾiṣ al-Ṭarab ('The Characteristics of Music'), on music and musical performance;
- A collection of epistles (rasāʾil);
- 24 of his poems on culinary are also preserved in Ibn Sayyār al-Warrāq's Kitāb al-Ṭabīkh.
