= Zuṭṭ =

Historical ethnic group in the Middle East

Zuṭṭ (Note: Arabic: الزط, romanized: al-Zuṭṭ, Classical Syriac: ܙܘ̈ܛܝܐ, romanized: ZWṬYʾ) is an Arabicised form of Jat. Originally inhabitants of lower Indus Valley, Jats were present in Mesopotamia from the 5th century CE since the times of the Sasanian Empire, although their main migration occurred after the establishment of Umayyad Caliphate. They were one of the prominent ethnic groups in lower Iraq during the Islamic Golden Age, serving as mercenary soldiers, farmers, traders and labourers in the Muslim states. Their mention fades from Arab chronicles after the 11th century.

== History ==
=== Geographic origins ===
"Zutt" is an Arab corruption of Jat. According to 9th century Basran scholar al-Jahiz, the ethnonym Jat was pronounced by the people of Sind as Zat, which in turn was Arabicised to Zuṭṭ. Al-Khwarizmi also attributes their roots to Sind and notes the Arabicization of their original name, Jit, to Zuṭṭ, and further highlights that the Zuṭṭ were employed to protect badhraqa (roads). At the time of the Umayyad conquest of Sindh in the early 8th century, Zutt (Jats) populated Makran and Turan (including Qiqan, modern Kalat) as far as the east bank of Indus River, where cities of Mansura and Multan were located. According to Ibn Khordadbeh, Jats safeguarded the entire trade route in the region which was known as bilād al-Zāt (land of the Jats). Makran had a significant number of Zutt at the time (or before) the Muslim conquest who had moved eastward into Sind as well in the following centuries. Goeje says Zutt were a people originating from Sind and claims that they were distributed throughout the Sassanid Empire. In Arabic literature, however, Sind referred to a larger region than the present province of Sindh and Makran, and the "land of Sind" designated the Indus valley or the area traversed by Indus river.

Regions from Makran and Turan till Mansura were the original homeland of Zutt people.

=== In early Islamic Arabia ===
The commercial activities of Zutt led to their settlements in Arabia. They were evidently present in Arabia before the advent of Islam, mainly around the Persian Gulf and are known to have interacted with Muhammad. Muhammad reportedly compared Musa (Moses) with them in physique, and stated him to be of brown complexion, straight hair and tall stature, resembling Zutt. On another occasion, when Aisha fell ill, her nephew sent for a Zutt physician to treat her. According to al-Tabari, some Zutt participated in the Ridda Wars against Muslims.

=== In Sassanid Empire ===
Sassanid emperor Bahram V (431–38) is said to have adopted a policy of tribal resettlement in the coastal regions. Due to it, a number of Zutt migrated, often with great herds of water buffalo, to the marshland of southern Iraq where they introduced large-scale rice farming. They may have come in the search of pastures there, and their presence is indicated by a canal called Nahr al-Zuṭṭ in Iraq, as well as a district called Zutt in Khuzistan or Bahrain. They also inhabited the city of Haumat al-Zutt in Khuzistan.

The last Sassanid emperor, Yazdegerd III, called Zutt from Sind to help in his war against Arabs. They fought as mercenary cavalry men for the Sassanian Empire, later defecting to the side of Muslims. When Muslims besieged the city of Ahwaz in Iran in 640, Zutt put up a strong resistance in the defence of the city along with Persian Aswaran. Later, as did Aswaran, who were known as Asawira during the caliphate period, they settled in Basra as allies of Banu Tamim.

=== In Rashidun and Umayyad Caliphates ===
Zutt formed a large population of the garrison town of Basra, where they became allies of the Arab tribe of Banu Hanzala in the inter-tribal warfare. The treasury of Basra was guarded by 40 or 400 Zutt soldiers during the reign of Ali under their chief Abu Salama al-Zutti, who were, according to the version narrated by Abu Mikhnaf, killed while protecting bayt al-mal when rebels under Talha and Zubayr occupied the city. Zutt regiments had fought along with Ali at the Battle of the Camel in 656 CE under their chief, Ali bin Danūr.

In 670 CE, a large number of Zutt, along with Aswaran, were moved into coastal cities of Syria, such as Antioch, Beirut and Tripoli, replacing the earlier Greek population, and a quarter in Antioch came to be known after them. This was an attempt by Umayyad caliph Mu'awiya I to ward off any possible naval invasion by Byzantine Empire. During this period, the role of Zutt and the associated groups was to guard the governors of different provinces, as well as to suppress revolts. They also acted as special troops to guard provincial treasuries. Zutt had been in Mesopotamia for long enough that they were considered distinct from Sindhis or Indians. In Iraq and elsewhere, they had their separate units under their own leaders, giving them a status of distinct sub-tribe in the Muslim society.

Map of Iraq in the later 9th century. Zutt primarily inhabited the marshland in lower Iraq.

==== Second migration ====
After the conquest of Sindh in 712, a second influx of Zutt occurred from Makran into Iraq. As a nomadic pastoral community, they did not originally profess Hinduism and instead followed their tribal religion. Zutt were barely integrated into the Hindu society of Sindh, and as they were always prone to rebellion, the Brahman dynasty had imposed discriminatory measures upon them, which were maintained by Arabs, and in some cases, even intensified after a long series of rebellions. Four thousand Zutt became captive of Muslims during the early Muslim incursions into Makran, and later they participated as auxiliaries in the conquest of Sindh. The two chief tribal groupings in Sindh at the time of Arab conquest were Zutt (Jats) and Meds. Unlike Jats, however, Meds were seafaring people. Some of them carried piracy in the Indian Ocean as Bawarij. The incident in which they captured two treasure ships coming from Ceylon to Basra became casus belli for the Umayyad invasion of Sindh.

In addition to Zutt, several other groups from Indus Valley had permanently settled into Mesopotamia, including Sāyabija and Andāghar, who were at times considered a part of Jats, and sometimes described separately. Muslim accounts describe these soldiers as originally inhabitants of Sind. An important sub-group of Zutt were Qayqāniyya, who inhabited the region of Qayqan (also known as Qiqān, modern Kalat). Many of them had been taken as captives between 659 and 664 by Abd Allah bin Sawwar al-Abdi to Iraq, who was appointed as governor of regions surrounding Sindh. He was himself killed in one of the wars against Qiqani Zutt in 667 and Qiqan was re-conquered by them. Always armed with arrows, whether cavalry or infantry, these Zutt Qayqaniyya units were master archers of the caliphate, and acted as auxiliary group for shurta. Qayqaniyya as well as Bukhariyya, an Iranian unit of soldiers, were sent to suppress revolt of Zayd ibn Ali in 740 by Umayyad Caliphate. Another group associated with Zutt was that of Qufs, or "mountain dwellers", who were dark-skinned soldiers from Kerman. They had been recruited by Sassanids as auxiliaries and later, actively supported Arabs against Sassanids. However, they had married among Persians and had assimilated to the Persian culture.

Jats (with their very name being synonymous with dromedary-men or cameleers) in Makran reportedly reared fine-quality camels which were in demand as far as Khurasan, and tall Qīqāni horses, which were presented to Mu'awiya I. In Basra, they manufactured a distinct variety of cloth called zuttī or zuttiyah. In the first half of 8th century, many of them were settled with herds of buffalo in the regions of Massisa and Amanus (present-day Turkey) to combat the large number of lions found there.

=== Within the Abbasid Caliphate ===
The position of Zutt as mercenary soldiers remained stable for some time after the Abbasid revolution and establishment of the Abbasid Caliphate. They still formed part of the armed forces of Basra during the governorship of Abbasid Sulayman bin Ali. During the Abbasid civil war (809 – 813), al-Sāri ibn al-Hakam al-Zutti gained control of the lower Egypt, including the capital city of Fustat in 813 and ruled it till his death in 820. He was a Zutt soldier of abna’ al-dawla, the elite Khurasani troops of Abbasid caliphate. His two sons, Abu Nāsr (r. 820–822) and Ubāydallah (r. 822–826) succeeded him as the emirs of Egypt. During this period, Egypt was independent from the Abbasids. Ubaydallah's reign came to an end in 826, when al-Ma'mun sought to achieve control over the country by dispatching to it the Tahirid general Abdallah ibn Tahir. Ubaydullah chose to fight against him, but his forces were defeated and he was forced into exile in Samarra, where he died in 865. According to the Arabist Thierry Bianquis, the succession of al-Sari by his sons signals the first attempt at creating an autonomous dynasty ruling Egypt, heralding the more successful Tulunids and Ikhshidids. According to Juan Signes Codoñer, Zutt may have been also involved in Thomas the Slav's revolt against the Byzantine Empire in 821–23.

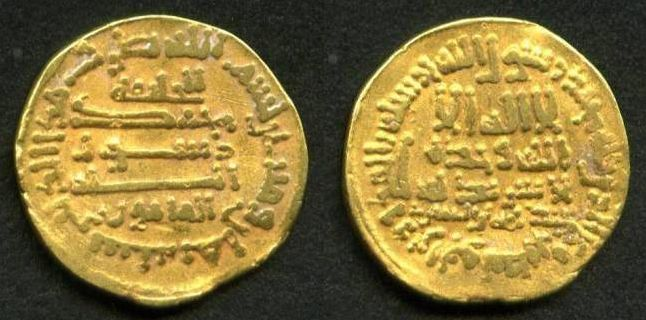
Gold dinar minted in Egypt in 823/4, displaying the names of the caliph al-Ma'mun and Ubaydallah ibn al-Sari

Jats produced a number of well-known people during the Islamic Golden Age. Famous theologian, Abu Hanifa, who was the founder of Hanafi school of thought, is considered by some to be one of them. His grandfather, named Zuttā, was brought as captive by Muslim armies in the late 7th century to lower Iraq. Other Zutt scholars include Ibn Ulayya, who was from Qayqan, and al-Awza'i. During this period, Zutt increasingly intermingled with other non-Arab foreign people in Basra, a cosmopolitan port at the time. They, along with Sayabija and Zanj, were designated as one of the Black peoples (Arabic: as-swadan) by Arabs. The term Black, however, was apparently applied to Berbers and Indians as well.

==== Zutt rebellion ====
As the central power of caliphate broke down after the mid-9th century, Zutt came to be viewed as outlaws and brigands instead of allies. Zutt, Asawira and other troops were effectively demilitarized at the start of century. Some of Zutt later turned into Banu Sasan, who were members of what C. E. Bosworth calls "Islamic Underworld". The Qiqaniyya, who had reputation as sea-faring people, turned to piracy along the coast of Baluchistan and Makran. The continued political suppression, as well as relative weakness of Abbasid control after the devastating civil war, encouraged the Zutt living in lower Iraq to rise in rebellion in 820 under the leadership of Muhammad ibn Uthman. Early Abbasid efforts to defeat Zutt proved unsuccessful, and they continued to levy taxes over caravans and to raid neighbouring regions of Basra. After the defeat of Ahmad bin Sa'd al-Bahili, Abbasids sent a large force of more than 10,000 under their general Ujayf ibn Anbasa in 834 to Wasit, which was a stronghold of Zutt. Abbasid forces blocked the waterways to the Iraqi marshes and thus cut down the communication lines of Zutt. The war continued for nine months, and included amphibious operations, until Zutt leaders agreed to surrender. They were ultimately deported to a village at the Byzantine frontier of Cilicia in 835. In 855, Byzantine army made an unexpected raid on the city of Anazarbus (`Ain Zarbah) and took many of them to Constantinople.

The Zutt rebellion lasted for 14 years before finally being put down. Al-Tabari, a 9th-century historian, quoted a long poem by a Zutt poet when they were being deported to Cilicia. in it, poet taunted people of Baghdad, where caliph was based, for their cowardice as they could not defeat Zutt and had to employ Turkic slave-soldiers against them. The poet held these Turks in military posts in low regard and instead glorified austerity of the Zutt.

=== Later period ===
Zutt also participated in the later Zanj and Qarmatian rebellions against the caliphate, with Abu Hatim al-Zutti being one of the major Qarmatian Da'is. Becoming active in 907, Abu Hatim prohibited his followers to slaughter animals and so they came to be known as Baqliyya, or "Green Grocers". They were a major sub-sect of Qarmatians in lower Iraq and staged multiple uprisings against the Abbasids. A certain Abū al-Faraj Muḥammad al-Zutti was a Buyid minister in Baghdad in 990. Zutt, along with Turks and Daylamis, formed part of army of Buyid prince Abu Nasr Shah-Firuz, ruler of Fasa, when he waged war against Baha' al-Dawla for the control of province of Fars in 1000 AD. They were described as most numerous and bravest of the warriors of Fars by Abbasid vizier al-Rudhrawari. Little is known about them any further, although they seem to have gained certain degree of notoriety along with Kurdish and Bedouin tribes.

Abbasid caliphate itself disintegrated after the anarchy at Samarra, and the regions of Makran, Sind and Multan became independent under Ma'danids, Hābbarids and Munābbihids, respectively. Owing to these developments, the movement of Jats into Iraq ceased. During the same period, Jats left Makran and moved upward to the fertile but thinly populated Punjab plains, which, since the 16th century, have been dominated by them.

=== Descendants ===
Afterwards, Jats lost their distinct identity in the Mesopotamia that they had previously. The 19th century Dutch orientalist De Goeje attempted to link Zutt with Romani of Europe. Bosworth acknowledges that Romanis speak a North Western Indo-Aryan language but believes the thesis to remain unproven. However, the term Zott has persisted in Arab countries, albeit in a pejorative way, to describe them because of their Indian origins.

Kristina Richardson, however, agrees with the identification of the Zuṭṭ as the forerunners of the modern Romani and Domari peoples and adds that this is supported by genetic and linguistic research. Rare genetic mutations have been identified in both the Jat of Pakistan and the Romani population of Slovakia. The Zuṭṭ were distinguished from the general population by their dark skin and thinness and made common cause with other outcast groups. Al-Jahiz in his writings uses the term kajār to denote a gypsy, and it is possible that the term has an origin from Indo-Aryan languages that the Zuṭṭ would have spoken. Abu Dulaf al-Ijli counts the Zuṭṭ along with the Zanj as part of the Banū Sāsān, a "low-status group" who were "often enslaved" and the Banū Sāsān are often connected with the modern Romanis.

It is believed that the Zutt later became what are now known as Marsh Arabs of Iraq. However, genetic studies show that the Marsh Arabs harbor mtDNAs and Y chromosomes that are predominantly of Middle Eastern origin and despite the cultural influence from the Indian subcontinent, the genetic input is marginal.

== See also ==
- Ibn al-A'rabi
- Ibn Shahak
- Abu al-Khasib

== Bibliography ==
- Zakeri, Mohsen (1995). Sāsānid Soldiers in Early Muslim Society: The Origins of ʻAyyārān and Futuwwa. Otto Harrassowitz Verlag. ISBN 978-3-447-03652-8.
- Wink, André (2002). Al-Hind, the Making of the Indo-Islamic World: Early Medieval India and the Expansion of Islam 7Th-11th Centuries. BRILL. ISBN 978-0-391-04173-8.
- Nizami, Khaliq Ahmad (1994). "Early Arab Contact with South Asia". Journal of Islamic Studies. 5 (1): 52–69. ISSN 0955-2340. JSTOR 26196673.
- Bosworth, C. E. (2012), "al-Zuṭṭ", Encyclopaedia of Islam, Second Edition, Brill, doi:10.1163/1573-3912_islam_sim_8217
- Malik, Jamal (2020). Islam in South Asia: Revised, Enlarged and Updated Second Edition. BRILL. ISBN 978-90-04-42271-1.
- Anthony, Sean (2011). The Caliph and the Heretic: Ibn Sabaʾ and the Origins of Shīʿism. BRILL. ISBN 978-90-04-21606-8.
- ʿAthamina, Khalil (1998). "Non-Arab Regiments and Private Militias during the Umayyād Period". Arabica. 45 (3): 347–378. ISSN 0570-5398. JSTOR 4057316.
- Bosworth, Clifford Edmund (1976). The Mediaeval Islamic Underworld: The Banū Sāsān in Arabic Society and Literature. The Banū Sāsān in Arabic life and lore. BRILL. ISBN 978-90-04-04392-3.
- Haug, Robert; Judd, Steven, eds. (2023-02-06). Islam on the Margins: Studies in Memory of Michael Bonner. BRILL. ISBN 978-90-04-52783-6.
- Codoñer, Juan Signes (2016). The Emperor Theophilos and the East, 829–842: Court and Frontier in Byzantium during the Last Phase of Iconoclasm. Routledge. ISBN 978-1-317-03427-8.
- Ehsan Yarshater, ed. (2015). The History of al-Ṭabarī Vol. 33: Storm and Stress along the Northern Frontiers of the ʿAbbasid Caliphate: The Caliphate of al-Muʿtaṣim A.D. 833-842/A.H. 218-227. State University of New York Press. ISBN 978-0-7914-9721-0.
- Anooshahr, Ali (2008). The Ghazi Sultans and the Frontiers of Islam: A comparative study of the late medieval and early modern periods. Routledge. ISBN 978-1-134-04134-3.
- Kennedy, Hugh N. (2006). The Byzantine and Early Islamic Near East. Ashgate Publishing, Ltd. ISBN 978-0-7546-5909-9.
- Bianquis, Thierry (1998). "Autonomous Egypt from Ibn Ṭūlūn to Kāfūr, 868–969". In Petry, Carl F. (ed.). Cambridge History of Egypt, Volume One: Islamic Egypt, 640–1517. Cambridge: Cambridge University Press. pp. 86–119. ISBN 978-0-521-47137-4.
- Westphal-Hellbusch, Sigrid; Westphal, Heinz (1964). The Jat of Pakistan. Duncker & Humblot, Berlin. OCLC 581010797.
- Maclean, Derryl N. (1984). Religion and Society in Arab Sind. McGill University. ISBN 978-0-315-20821-6.
- Daftary, Farhad (2011). Historical Dictionary of the Ismailis. Scarecrow Press. p. 29. ISBN 978-0-8108-7970-6.
- Asher, Catherine Ella Blanshard; Talbot, Cynthia (2006). India before Europe. Cambridge University Press. ISBN 978-0-521-80904-7.
- Richardson, Kristina (2021). Roma in the Medieval Islamic World: Literacy, Culture, and Migration. Bloomsbury Publishing. ISBN 9780755635788.
