= Abu Nasr ibn al-Sari =

9th-century governor of Egypt

- ابو نصر بن السري

Governor of Egypt
- In office 820–822
- Monarch: Al-Ma'mun
- Preceded by: Al-Sari ibn al-Hakam
- Succeeded by: Ubaydallah ibn al-Sari

Personal details
- Died: 822 Egypt
- Parent: Al-Sari ibn al-Hakam

Abu Nasr Muhammad ibn al-Sari (Arabic: أبو نصر بن السري; died January 822) was a governor of Egypt for the Abbasid Caliphate, from 820 until his death.

== Career ==
Abu Nasr was the son of al-Sari ibn al-Hakam al-Zuṭṭi, the governor of Egypt in 816 and 817–820, and inherited that position upon his father's death in November 820. During his governorship Egypt remained divided among the various factions that had seized control in the midst of the power vacuum created during the civil war between al-Amin and al-Ma'mun, and Abu Nasr's actual authority was mainly limited to the southern portion of the province, while much of Lower Egypt was in the hands of Ali ibn Abd al-Aziz al-Jarawi, the son of al-Sari's former rival Abd al-Aziz ibn al-Wazir al-Jarawi.

Following Abu Nasr's appointment he and al-Jarawi continued their fathers' rivalry in an effort to gain mastery over the country. Two battles fought at Shatnuf and Damanhur reportedly left at least seven thousand dead and ended in losses for Abu Nasr's forces under the command of his brother Ahmad. Al-Jarawi's men subsequently advanced to the capital Fustat and threatened to burn the city, but after receiving an appeal from its residents al-Jarawi was convinced to make peace instead.

Abu Nasr died in 822 after a term of fourteen months in office and was succeeded by his brother Ubaydallah ibn al-Sari.

== Notes ==
Preceded by al-Sari ibn al-Hakam	Governor of Egypt; 820–822	Succeeded by Ubadyallah ibn al-Sari
