= Al-Sari ibn al-Hakam =

Abbasid governor and defacto ruler of Egypt from 815 to 820

Al-Sari ibn al-Hakam al-Zutti
- السري بن الحكم بن یوسف الزطي

Governor of Egypt
- In office 815–820
- Monarch: Al-Ma'mun
- Preceded by: Al-Muttalib ibn Abdallah al-Khuza'i
- Succeeded by: Abu Nasr ibn al-Sari

Personal details
- Born: unknown
- Died: November 820 Egypt
- Children: Abu Nasr ibn al-Sari; Ubaydallah ibn al-Sari

Al-Sari ibn al-Hakam ibn Yusuf al-Zutti (Arabic: السري بن الحكم بن یوسف الزطي ; Punjabi: السرّی بن الحکم بن یوسف الزطّی) (died November 820), nisba also given as al-Balkhi, served twice as the nominal governor of Egypt in the Abbasid Caliphate.

== Career ==
Al-Sari ibn al-Hakam was of Zutt origins from Punjab. According to al-Kindi, he was initially an unimportant member of the so-called abna’ al-dawla, the Khurasani troops that formed the mainstay of the Abbasid regime. He came to Egypt in 799 in the retinue of al-Layth ibn al-Fadl, and soon rose to a position of influence within the local abna’. The early years of the 9th century were a time of turmoil for Egypt, where the old-established elites of the original Arab settlers of Fustat losing power to the abna’ and their rivals, the Yemeni tribes of northern Egypt, grouped around Abd al-Aziz ibn al-Wazir al-Jarawi. Taking advantage of the collapse of Abbasid central authority due to the civil war between al-Amin and al-Ma'mun, Abd al-Aziz and al-Sari, with their respective factions, engaged in a vicious struggle for control of the province that by 813 had effectively divided Egypt between them, with the Yemenis holding the north and al-Sari Fustat and the south.

His first tenure as governor of Egypt was short, lasting from April to September 816, but he was reappointed to the post in March 817 and held it until his death in November 820. He was succeeded by his sons as nominal governors of the province. The north remained under Abd al-Aziz's son Ali ibn Abd al-Aziz al-Jarawi (Abd al-Aziz also died in 820), and a first Abbasid attempt at recovering control over the province by sending Khalid ibn Yazid al-Shaybani in 822 was thwarted. Al-Sari's son Ubayd Allah ruled as governor until mid-826, when Abdallah ibn Tahir was named governor of Egypt and re-established Abbasid authority.

According to the Arabist Thierry Bianquis, the succession of al-Sari by his sons signals the first attempt at creating an autonomous dynasty ruling Egypt, heralding the more successful Tulunids and Ikhshidids.

== See also ==
- Al-Sindi ibn Shahak
- Abu al-Khaṣīb Marzuq

== Sources ==
- Bianquis, Thierry (1998). "Autonomous Egypt from Ibn Ṭūlūn to Kāfūr, 868–969". In Petry, Carl F. (ed.). Cambridge History of Egypt, Volume One: Islamic Egypt, 640–1517. Cambridge: Cambridge University Press. pp. 86–119. ISBN 978-0-521-47137-4.
- Grohmann, A. (1997). "al-Sarī". In Bosworth, C. E.; van Donzel, E.; Heinrichs, W. P. & Lecomte, G. (eds.). The Encyclopaedia of Islam, Second Edition. Volume IX: San–Sze. Leiden: E. J. Brill. p. 55. doi:10.1163/1573-3912_islam_SIM_6641. ISBN 978-90-04-10422-8.
- Walker, J. (1995). "Nūrī". In Bosworth, C. E.; van Donzel, E.; Heinrichs, W. P. & Lecomte, G. (eds.). The Encyclopaedia of Islam, Second Edition. Volume VIII: Ned–Sam. Leiden: E. J. Brill. doi:10.1163/1573-3912_islam_SIM_5994. ISBN 978-90-04-09834-3.
- Kennedy, Hugh (1998). "Egypt as a province in the Islamic caliphate, 641–868". In Petry, Carl F. (ed.). Cambridge History of Egypt, Volume One: Islamic Egypt, 640–1517. Cambridge: Cambridge University Press. pp. 62–85. ISBN 978-0-521-47137-4.
- Beg, Muhammad Abdul Jabbar (1981). Social Mobility in Islamic Civilization: The Classical Period. University of Malaya Press. ISBN 978-96-79-99006-5.

Preceded by Muttalib ibn Abdallah ibn Malik	Governor of Egypt; 816	Succeeded by Sulayman ibn Ghalib al-Bajali
Preceded by Sulayman ibn Ghalib al-Bajali	Governor of Egypt; 817–820	Succeeded by Abu Nasr ibn al-Sari
