= Al-Sindi ibn Shahak =

Abbasid general and administrator (died 819)

Abbasid Governor of Syria
- In office 792–793
- Monarch: Harun ar-Rashid

Abbasid Governor of Baghdad Sahib al-Shurta
- In office 802–813
- Monarchs: Harun ar-Rashid al-Amin

Personal details
- Born: Abbasid Caliphate
- Died: 819
- Children: Ibrahim ibn al-Sindi (son); Nasr ibn al-Sindi (son); Kushajim (grandson)
- Parent: Shahak

Military service
- Allegiance: Abbasid Caliphate
- Years of service: 792–813
- Battles/wars: Fourth Fitna

Al-Sindi ibn Shahak (died 819) was a late 8th-century Abbasid general and administrator who served as the governor of Syria, Damascus and Baghdad under al-Mansur, Harun ar-Rashid and al-Amin. As the head of shurta (military police), he oversaw the destruction and confiscation of properties belonging to the Barmakids during the reign of Harun.

== Biography ==
The origins of al-Sindi are obscure; he was apparently a former slaver from Punjab who had risen to high status. He was a client (mawali) of Abbasid caliph al-Mansur, and served as governor of Syria during his reign. In 792 or 793, he was sent by Harun al Rashid to quell the revolt of Abū al-Hadhām in Damascus as commander of Khurasani troops, where he is mentioned as governor for Musa ibn Isa. He commanded the garrison of Damascus (Jund Dimashq) for a few years.

A decade later, he is mentioned as the governor of Baghdad in 802 (186 H) by Ibn al-Jawzi. During the reign of Harun, al-Sindi was the sahib al-shurta, and oversaw the destruction of Barmakids in 802. Shi'a traditions also held him responsible for death of seventh Shia Imam, Musa al-Kazim in 799 and Yahya ibn Abdallah, a rebel Alid leader in 803. However, Musa al-Kazim was probably under house arrest in the mansion of al-Sindi instead of prison. He was treated well, and the sister of al-Sindi reportedly looked after him. Imam had died in his custody in September 799.

Al-Sindi was one of the leading supporters of al-Amin in his civil war. Not much is known about him after the defeat and execution of al-Amin in 813.

== Family ==
The family of al-Sindi continued to serve the Abbasid caliphate for multiple decades. His son, Ibrahim ibn al-Sindi, was reportedly a polymath with more than a dozen occupations attributed to him. His friend al-Jahiz stated him to be a philosopher of mutakallimun. According to Jahiz, he was well-versed in grammar, poetry, astrology and medicine. He was also employed in the intelligence service of caliph al-Ma'mun, and served some time as governor of Kufa. His another son, Nasr ibn al-Sindi was also renowned as a historian and traditionist. His grandson, Mahmūd ibn al-Hāsan ibn al-Sindi, commonly known as Kushajim (c. 902 – 970) was a famous court poet and polymath associated with the court of Sayf al-Dawla, the emir of Aleppo. Some of his well-known books include Adab an-nadīm (Etiquette of the Boon-Companion), Kitāb al-maṣāyid wa-l-maṭārid (The Book of Snares and Game), and Khaṣā’iṣ aṭ-ṭarab (The Characteristics of Music).

== See also ==
- Al-Sari ibn al-Hakam
- Abu al-Khaṣīb Marzuq
