= Museum of Islamic Art, Cairo =

Museum in Cairo, Egypt

Museum of Islamic Art
- متحف الفن الاسلامى
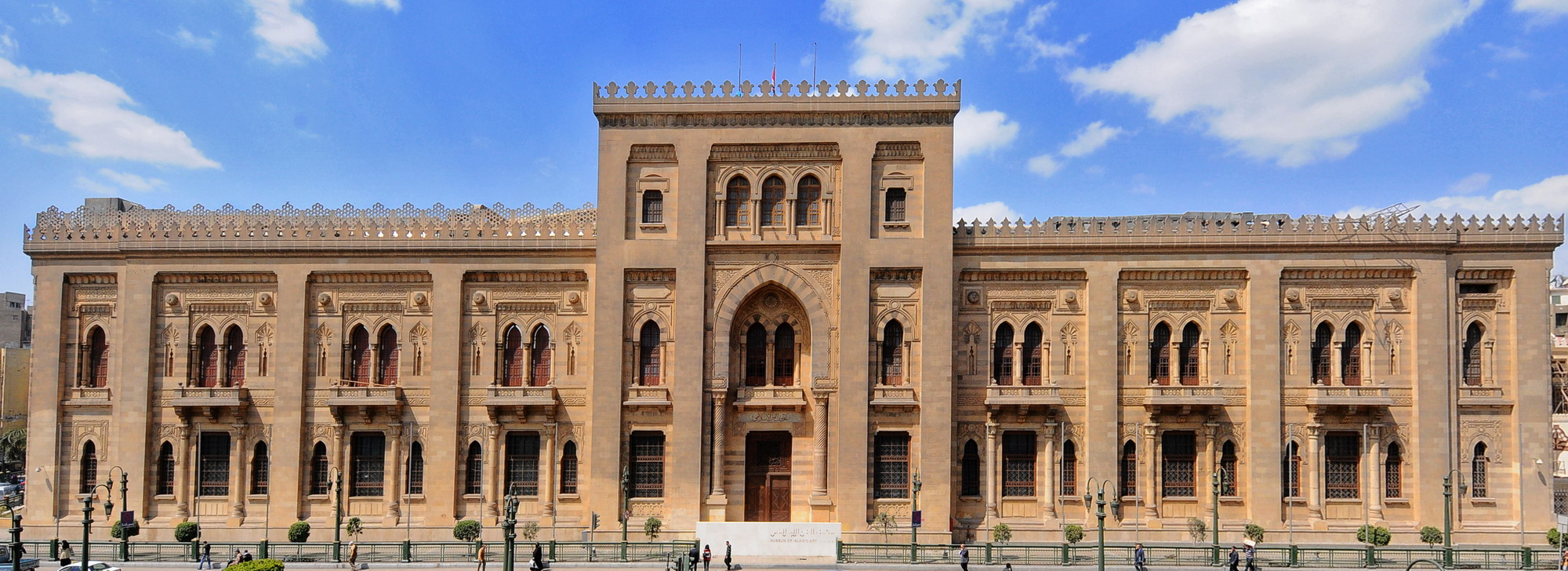
- Established: 1903; 123 years ago
- Location: Cairo
- Coordinates: 30°02′41″N 31°15′10″E
- Type: Art museum
- Director: Ahmed seyam
- Curator: Abbas Hilmi II
- Website: http://www.miaegypt.org

The Museum of Islamic Art (MIA; Egyptian Arabic: متحف الفن الاسلامى) is a museum in Cairo, Egypt. The museum has a collection of rare woodwork and plaster artefacts, as well as metal, ceramic, glass, crystal, and textile objects of all periods, from all over the Islamic world.

In recent years, the museum has displayed about 4,500 artefacts in 25 halls, but it houses more than 100,000 objects, with the remainder in storage. The collection includes rare manuscripts of the Qur'an, with some calligraphy written in silver ink, on pages with elaborate borders.

The museum has conducted archaeological excavations in the Fustat area and has organized a number of national and international exhibitions. The museum closed for renovations in 2003, and re-opened 8 years later, in August 2010. The restoration cost nearly US$10 million.

== History ==
Although recognition of the Egyptian Pharaonic art was signalled in Cairo by the establishment in 1858 of the Egyptian Department of Antiquities and the Egyptian Museum, the appreciation of Islamic art lagged behind. The Khedive Ismail Pasha approved a proposal to establish a museum of Islamic art in the courtyard of the Mosque of Baibars, but this was not carried out until 1880, when Khedive Tawfiq ordered the Ministry of Endowments (ar: الأوقاف - Awqaf) to set it up.

Julius Franz, an Austrian scholar of Hungarian descent, the head of the technical department at the Awqaf, proposed in 1881 that the ruined mosque of the Fatimid caliph al-Hakim, adjacent to the Bab Al-Futuh, to be a provisional seat for the museum. A gallery was accordingly furnished there in the eastern arcade, consisting initially of 111 architectural pieces taken from other monuments.

Matters improved the same year when Khedive Tawfiq approved the "Committee of Arab Antiquities", whose duties included running the Arab Museum, and providing it with objects as well as preserving the monuments. As a result, the arcades of the mosque were filled to overflowing. In 1884, a two-storey structure was built in the courtyard to house the collection of 900 objects, although its staff consisted of only one curator and a door keeper.

In 1887 Max Herz, also Austro-Hungarian, replaced Julius Franz, and began making many changes. He suggested the name of the museum back then as the gallery of Arab Antiquities (ar: دار الآثار العربية - Dar Al-Athar Al-Arabiya). By 1895 the collection numbered to 1,641, and the new building became too crowded, so he requested the Awqaf build a larger museum. In 1899 the foundations were laid for the present larger building in the Bab Al-Khalq area of Cairo.

The new and current building was designed by Alfonso Manescalo, and was completed in 1902 in neo-Mamluk style, with its upper storey housing the National Library. The old museum in al-Hakim was demolished in the 1970s, during refurbishment of the mosque there.

== Design ==
The museum faces historic Cairo. It has two entrances: one on the north-eastern side and the other on the south-eastern side. A beautiful garden with a fountain once led to the first entrance, but was later removed. The entrance on Port Said Street features a very luxurious façade, rich with decorations and recesses inspired by Islamic architecture in Egypt from various periods. The museum is a two-storey building; the lower floor contains the exhibition halls and the upper floor contains the general stores. The basement contains a store connected with the Restoration Section.

== Bomb damage ==
On January 24, 2014, a car bomb attack targeting the Cairo police headquarters on the other side of the street caused considerable damage to the museum and destroyed many artifacts. It's estimated that 20-30% of the artifacts required restoration. The blast also severely damaged the building's façade, erasing intricate designs in the Islamic style. The National Library in the same building was also affected.

== Reopening ==
Following the car bomb damage there was a period of reconstruction and restoration, during which the majority of affected artefacts were retained. The museum reopened in January 2017.

== Collection ==
The collection features artifacts from Egypt, North Africa, Andalusia, the Arabian Peninsula and Iran ranging from the 7th to the 19th century. The exhibited artifacts of the right wing of the MIA are divided by the Umayyad, Abbasid, Ayubid, Mamluk and Ottoman periods. The exhibited artifacts of the left wing of the MIA are divided into sections by science, astronomy, calligraphy, coins, stones and textiles, covering various epochs.

== Gallery ==
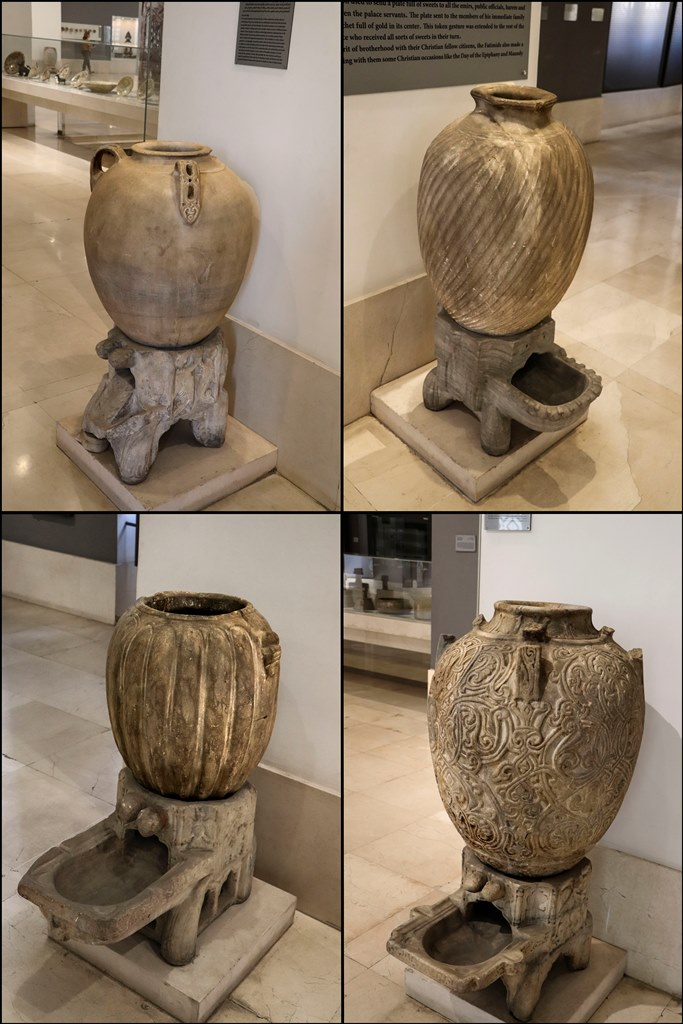
Marble jars and stands with engraved ornamentation

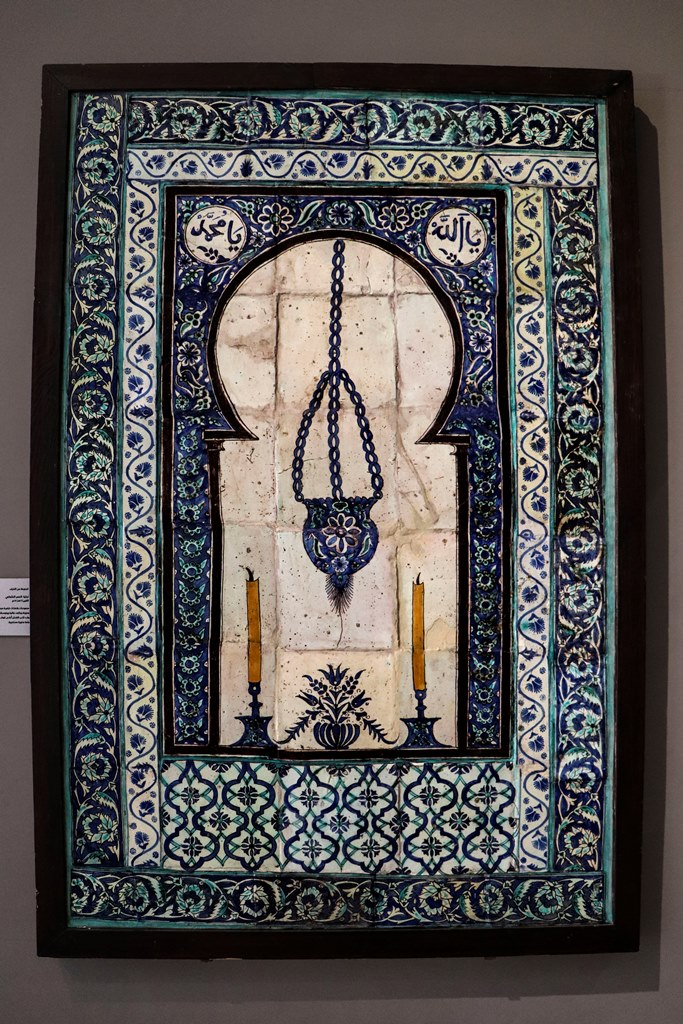
Ceramic tile panel with painted under glaze decoration and transparent glaze overall, 17th century
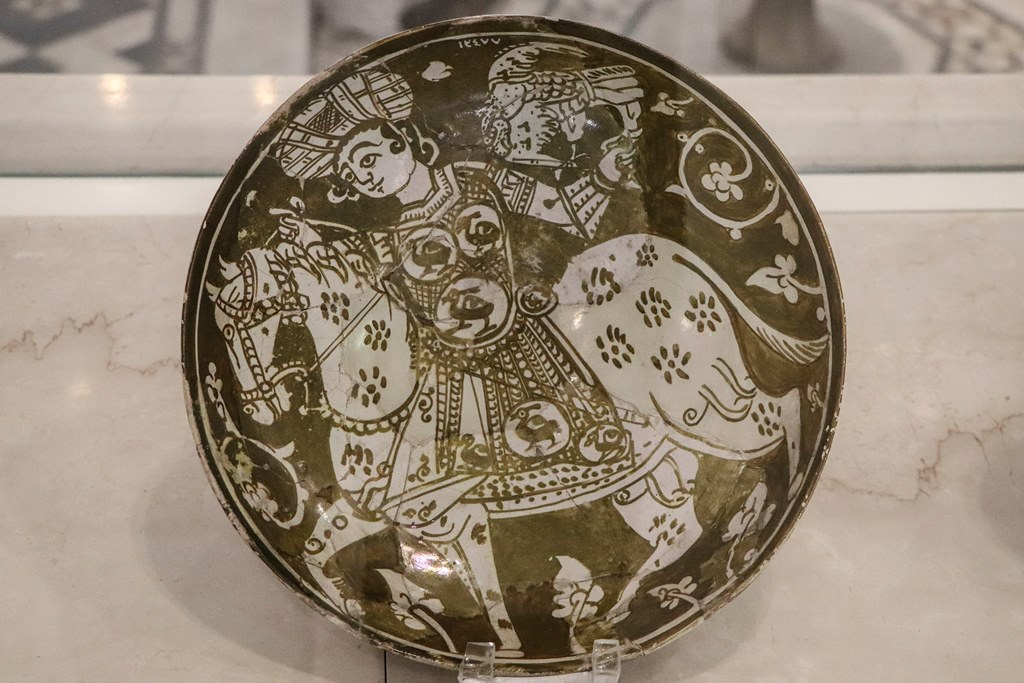
Luster painted large dish, Fatimid era

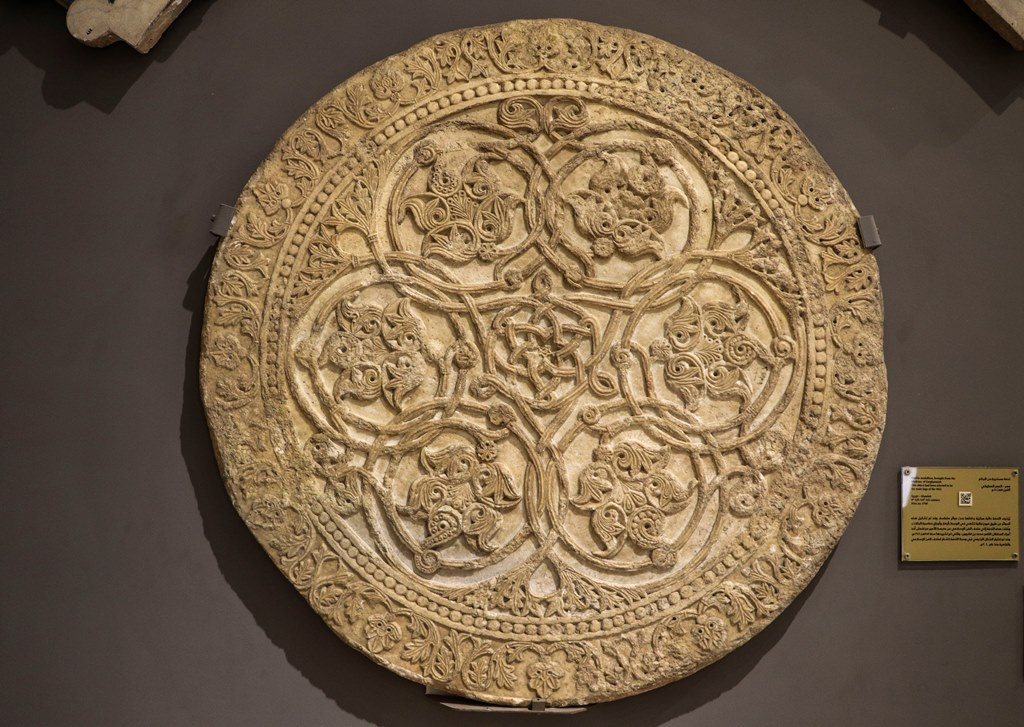
Marble medallion, the main logo of the MIA

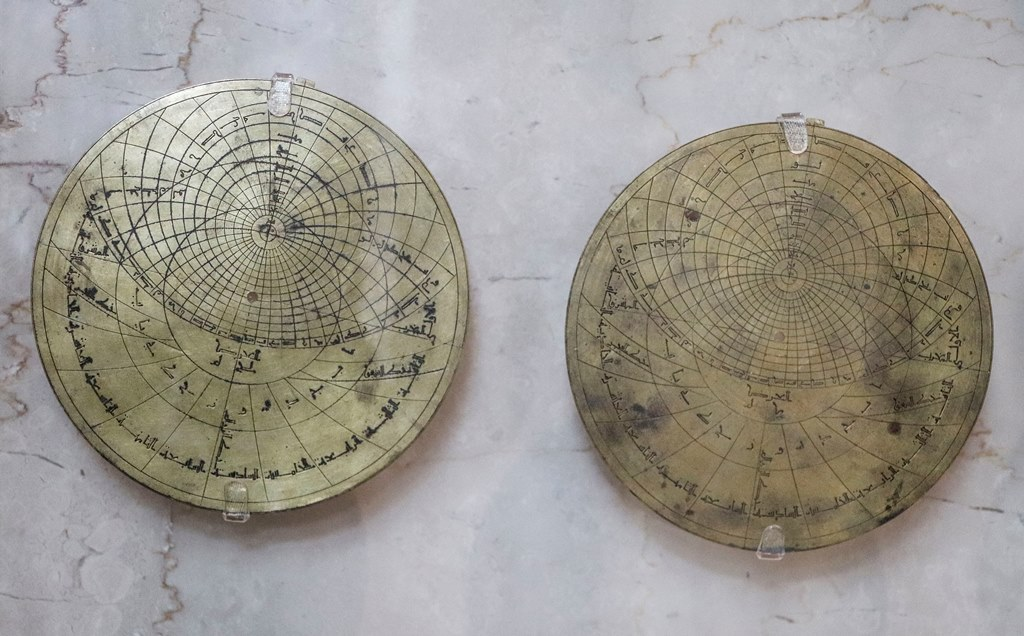
Two astrolabes of copper, 14th-18th century

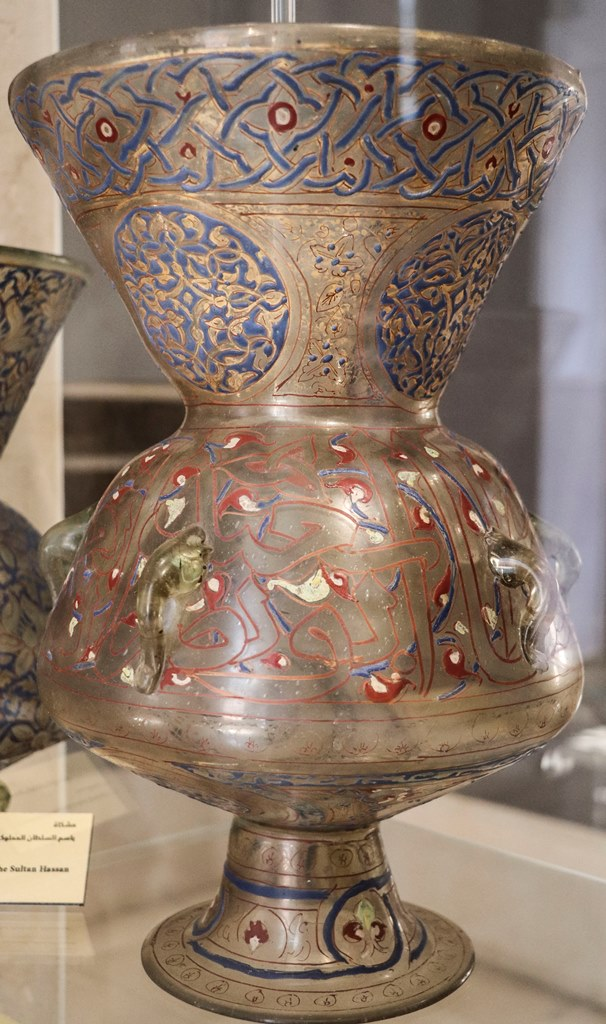
Gilded and enameled glass mosque lamp, Mamluk period

== See also ==
- List of museums of Islamic art
