= Abu Awn Abd al-Malik ibn Yazid =

8th-century Abbasid provincial governor

Abbasid Governor of Egypt
- In office 751–753
- Monarch: al-Saffah
- Preceded by: Salih ibn Ali
- Succeeded by: Salih ibn Ali

Abbasid Governor of Egypt
- In office 755–758
- Monarch: al-Mansur
- Preceded by: Salih ibn Ali
- Succeeded by: Musa ibn Ka'b al-Tamimi

Abbasid Governor of Khorasan
- In office 766 – 767 (one year)
- Monarch: al-Mansur
- Preceded by: Humayd ibn Qahtaba
- Succeeded by: Mu'adh ibn Muslim

Personal details
- Died: 784/785
- Parent: Yazid (father)
- Nickname: Abu Awn

Abū ʿAwn ʿAbd al-Malik ibn Yazīd al-Khurasānī (Arabic: أبو عون عبدالملك بن يزيد الخراساني; fl. 747–784/5) was an early supporter of the Abbasids. He participated in the campaigns of the Abbasid Revolution and served as governor of Egypt and Khurasan.

== Biography ==
Abu Awn Abd al-Malik was a native Persian from Jurjan, who became a mawla of the tribe of Huna'a (a part of the Azdi group). According to Patricia Crone, despite his support of the Abbasids, "his names reveal a pro-Umayyad background". He was the leader of the Abbasid missionary movement (the Da'wa) in his native Jurjan (along with Amir ibn Isma'il and Khalid ibn Barmak), and one of the senior members of the movement in Khurasan. He was the first recipient of the black banners which came to symbolise the Abbasid dynasty. When the Abbasid Revolution broke out in June 747, he was named as the commander of a unit recruited from Jurjan, and was sent to suppress the Kharijites in the region, a task which he carried out with success.

Abu Awn participated in the westwards campaign against the Umayyads under Qahtaba ibn Shabib al-Ta'i, which reached the borders of Iraq. There Qahtaba sent him north to Shahrazur to counter an Umayyad army under Uthman ibn Sufyan which was threatening his right flank. Abu Awn joined forces with another Abbasid force under Amir ibn Isma'il, and a local tribal chieftain, but his forces, some 4,000 men, were not as strong as the Umayyad army. Nevertheless, he decided to attack and on 10 August 749 his army routed the forces of Uthman (who according to some accounts fell in the battle) and captured the district of Shahrazur.

Despite the presence of Caliph Marwan II with the main Umayyad army nearby in the Jazira, Abu Awn was not bothered by the Umayyads and was able to join the new Abbasid general, Abd Allah ibn Ali, in the decisive Battle of the Zab on 25 January 750, which resulted in the defeat and flight of Marwan II and the capitulation of the Umayyad heartland, Syria.

While Abd Allah ibn Ali remained in Palestine, he dispatched his brother, Salih ibn Ali, along with Abu Awn to continue the pursuit of Marwan II, who fled to Egypt in May/June 750. Salih and Abu Awn invaded the country, and in August 750 the last Umayyad resistance was crushed at Busir, with Marwan II and many of his followers being killed. Salih became the new governor of Egypt, and was succeeded by Abu Awn in 751. Abu Awn served as governor until 753, when Salih returned to the post, and again in 755–758.

Abu Awn re-appears in 766/67, when he participated in the suppression of the revolt of Ustadh Sis in Khurasan. When Ustadh Sis, hard-pressed by the armies of Khazim ibn Khuzayma al-Tamimi, decided to surrender, he chose to submit himself and his followers to the arbitration of Abu Awn (whom some sources suggest he personally knew, perhaps from the time of the Abbasid Revolution). Abu Awn ordered the arrest and deportation of Ustadh Sis and his family to Baghdad, but let the remainder of his followers, some 30,000 men, go free.

Abu Awn was appointed governor of Khurasan in 775/76, but was dismissed the following year for failing to suppress the rebellion of al-Muqanna. He was replaced by Mu'adh ibn Muslim. According to Hugh N. Kennedy, he died c. 784/785.

== Sources ==
- Crone, Patricia (1980). Slaves on Horses: The Evolution of the Islamic Polity (1980 ed.). Cambridge: Cambridge University Press. ISBN 978-0521229616.
- Daniel, Elton L. (1979). The Political and Social History of Khurasan under Abbasid Rule, 747–820. Minneapolis & Chicago: Bibliotheca Islamica, Inc. ISBN 0-88297-025-9.
- Kennedy, Hugh, ed. (1990). The History of al-Ṭabarī, Volume XXIX: Al-Mansūr and al-Mahdī, A.D. 763–786/A.H. 146–169. SUNY Series in Near Eastern Studies. Albany, New York: State University of New York Press. ISBN 978-0-7914-0142-2.
- Kennedy, Hugh (1998). "Egypt as a province in the Islamic caliphate, 641–868". In Petry, Carl F. (ed.). Cambridge History of Egypt, Volume One: Islamic Egypt, 640–1517. Cambridge: Cambridge University Press. pp. 62–85. ISBN 0-521-47137-0.
- Sharon, Moshe (1990). Revolt: the social and military aspects of the ʿAbbāsid revolution. Jerusalem: Graph Press Ltd. ISBN 965-223-388-9.
- Zetterstéen, K.V. (1960). "Abū ʿAwn". In Gibb, H. A. R.; Kramers, J. H.; Lévi-Provençal, E.; Schacht, J.; Lewis, B. & Pellat, Ch. (eds.). The Encyclopaedia of Islam, Second Edition. Volume I: A–B. Leiden: E. J. Brill. p. 108. OCLC 495469456.

Preceded by Salih ibn Ali	Governor of Egypt; 751–753	Succeeded by Salih ibn Ali
Preceded by Salih ibn Ali	Governor of Egypt; 755–758	Succeeded by Musa ibn Ka'b
Preceded by Humayd ibn Qahtaba	Governor of Khurasan; 766–767	Succeeded by Mu'adh ibn Muslim
