= Battle of the Zab =

Part of the Abbasid Revolution, 750 AD

Coordinates: 35°59′28″N 43°20′37″E

- Part of the Abbasid revolution
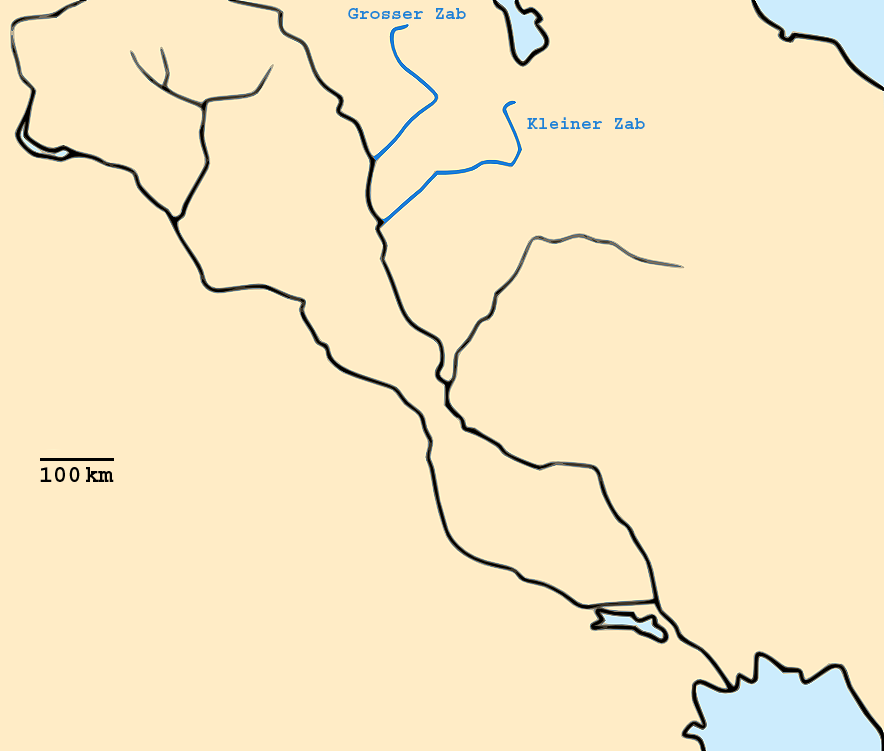
- Great Zab River Map in Iraq
Date	January 25, 750
Location	near the Great Zab, Iraq
Result	Abbasid victory

Belligerents
Abbasid Hashimiyya	Umayyad Caliphate

Commanders and leaders
Abd Allah ibn Ali; Abd al-Malik ibn Yazid; Musa ibn Ka'b al-Tamimi	Marwan II †

Strength
10,000–30,000	100,000–150,000

The Battle of the Zab (Arabic: معركة الزاب), also referred to in scholarly contexts as Battle of the Great Zāb River, took place on January 25, 750, on the banks of the Great Zab in what is now the modern country of Iraq. It spelled the end of the Umayyad Caliphate and the rise of the Abbasid Caliphate, which would last from 750 to 1258.

== Background ==
The revolution began in earnest in Ramadan 129 (June 747) when Abu Muslim raised the black banners of the Abbasid movement in the villages surrounding Merv. In February 748 (Jumada II 130), Abu Muslim established control over Merv and appointed Qahtaba ibn Shabib al-Ta'i to lead the army westward. This force won a series of decisive victories across Iran, notably defeating a large Umayyad army under Amir ibn Dubara at Jablaq, near Isfahan, in March 749. By August 749 (the beginning of 132 AH), the Abbasid armies reached the Euphrates near Kufa.

During this westward advance, the Umayyad caliph Marwan II arrested the Abbasid leader Ibrahim al-Imam, who died shortly afterwards in custody at Harran. Leadership passed to his brother Abu al-Abbas, who was hidden in Kufa following a pro-Abbasid coup in the city led by Muhammad ibn Khalid al-Qasri. At the beginning of 132 AH (August 749), Qahtaba ibn Shabib al-Ta'i crossed the Euphrates and defeated the forces of the Umayyad governor Yazid ibn Umar ibn Hubayra in an encounter near Karbala. Although Qahtaba fell in battle, his son Al-Hasan ibn Qahtaba took command and forced Ibn Hubayra to retire to Wasit, leaving Kufa uncovered. Abbasid forces subsequently entered Kufa, where Abu al-Abbas emerged from hiding and was eventually proclaimed caliph. With southern Iraq secured, the Abbasid leadership turned its attention to a final confrontation with Marwan II in the region of Al-Jazira, south of Mosul, leading directly to the engagement at the Great Zab.

== Battle ==
The battle took place in early 750 near the Great Zab River. Marwan II moved from Harran and set up his base at Mosul with a large army of Syrian veterans. The Abbasid force was first led by Abu Awn but soon grew with 15,000 more soldiers. To make sure the victory belonged to his family, the Abbasid leader al-Saffah sent his uncle Abd Allah ibn Ali to take full command.

The two sides fought small battles for several days. On 15 January 750 a small Abbasid group raided the camp of Marwan. The next day the son of Marwan won a small victory against another Abbasid group. Abd Allah ibn Ali worried that these small losses would scare his men. He decided to start a full battle before his soldiers lost their courage.

On 25 January 750 Marwan II made a big mistake. He ordered his men to cross a bridge of boats to attack the Abbasids on the other side of the river. Even though the Umayyads had more men their army was split by tribal fights. The main fight started early when an Umayyad leader named Walid ibn Mu'awiya ignored orders and charged the Abbasid right side with his cavalry.

Abd Allah ibn Ali used a special defense. The Abbasid horsemen got off their horses to fight as infantry. They knelt in a tight line and held their spears out to make a wall of iron. Archery teams stood behind them and shot arrows at the charging Syrian horses. A Khorasani soldier said the Syrians attacked like mountains of iron but they broke apart like clouds when they hit the spears.

The Umayyad lines fell apart as the Abbasids pushed back. Marwan tried to encourage his men by opening his bags of gold coins. This caused a mess because the soldiers started fighting for the money. Other units thought this was a retreat and they began to run toward the river. Marwan ordered the bridge to be destroyed to stop the Abbasids from following him. This trapped his own men and many Umayyad soldiers drowned in the cold river.

== Aftermath ==
Marwan II may have been wounded in the battle, possibly receiving a head wound. He fled at last to Abusir, a small town in the Egyptian Nile Delta, while the Abbasid commander Abd Allah ibn Ali remained in Syria. Abd Allah ibn Ali dispatched a small Abbasid detachment under the command of Abu Awn and Salih ibn Ali, who was the uncle of Al-Saffah, to pursue Marwan. A few months after the battle, they found him hiding in a church, where he was overpowered and slain in the encounter. His head was sent to the Abbasid commander Salih ibn Ali, who had the tongue cut out and thrown to a cat to show his contempt.

== See also ==
- Siege of Wasit
- Abbasid revolution
- Third Fitna

== Sources ==
- Grohmann, Adolph & Kennedy, Hugh (1995). "Ṣāliḥ b. ʿAlī". In Bosworth, C. E.; van Donzel, E.; Heinrichs, W. P. & Lecomte, G. (eds.). The Encyclopaedia of Islam, Second Edition. Volume VIII: Ned–Sam. Leiden: E. J. Brill. p. 985. ISBN 978-90-04-09834-3.
- Moscati, S. (1960). "Abū Muslim". In Gibb, H. A. R.; Kramers, J. H.; Lévi-Provençal, E.; Schacht, J.; Lewis, B. & Pellat, Ch. (eds.). The Encyclopaedia of Islam, Second Edition. Volume I: A–B. Leiden: E. J. Brill. p. 141. OCLC 495469456.
- Yūsofī, Ḡ. Ḥ. (1983). "ABŪ MOSLEM ḴORĀSĀNĪ". In Yarshater, Ehsan (ed.). Encyclopædia Iranica. Vol. I/4: Abū Manṣūr Heravı̄–Adat. London and New York: Routledge & Kegan Paul. pp. 341–344. ISBN 978-0-71009-093-5.
- Zetterstéen, K.V. (1987). "ʿAbd Allāh b. ʿAlī". In Houtsma, Martijn Theodoor (ed.). E.J. Brill's first encyclopaedia of Islam, 1913–1936, Volume I: A–Bābā Beg. Leiden: Brill. pp. 22–23. ISBN 90-04-08265-4.
- Afsaruddin, Asma (8 March 2018). "Islamic History: Umayyad Dynasty". Encyclopædia Britannica. J.E. Luebering, Exec. Dir., Core Editorial Group (online ed.). Chicago, IL: Encyclopædia Britannica. See also the topic, Battle of the Great Zab River.
- "Islamic History: Abbasid Caliphate". Encyclopædia Britannica (online ed.). Chicago, IL: Encyclopædia Britannica. 2019. See also the topic, Battle of the Great Zab River.
- Kennedy, H. (2004). The Prophet and the Age of the Caliphates: The Islamic Near East from the 6th to the 11th Century. ISBN 978-0-582-40525-7.
- Frye, Richard N., ed. (1975). The Cambridge History of Iran, Volume 4. Cambridge University Press. ISBN 9780521200936.
- Crone, Patricia (1980). Slaves on Horses: The Evolution of the Islamic Polity. ISBN 0-521-52940-9.
- Kennedy, H. (2016). The Early Abbasid Caliphate: A Political History. ISBN 9781317358077.
- Muir, William (1924). The Caliphate: Its Rise, Decline and Fall, from Original Sources. London: Smith, Elder & Co.
- Holt, P. M., ed. (1995). The Cambridge History of Islam, Volume 1A. Cambridge University Press. ISBN 9780521291354.
- Judd, Steven C. (2019). "Yazīd b. ʿUmar b. Hubayra". In Fleet, Kate; Krämer, Gudrun; Matringe, Denis; Nawas, John; Rowson, Everett (eds.). Encyclopaedia of Islam (3rd ed.). Brill Online. doi:10.1163/1573-3912_ei3_COM_36664. ISSN 1873-9830.
- Vadet, J.-C. (1971). "Ibn Hubayra". In Lewis, B.; Ménage, V. L.; Pellat, Ch. & Schacht, J. (eds.). The Encyclopaedia of Islam, Second Edition. Volume III: H–Iram. Leiden: E. J. Brill. p. 802. doi:10.1163/1573-3912_islam_SIM_3205. OCLC 495469525.
- Sharon, Moshe (1983). Black Banners from the East: The Establishment of the ʻAbbāsid State : Incubation of a Revolt. JSAI. ISBN 978-965-223-501-5.
- Bobrick, Benson (2012). The Caliph's Splendor: Islam and the West in the Golden Age of Baghdad. Simon & Schuster. ISBN 978-1416567622.
- Williams, John Alden (1985). The History of al-Tabari, Volume XXVII: The Abbasid Revolution, A.D. 743–750/A.H. 126–132. Albany, New York: State University of New York Press. ISBN 9780791406250.
