= Musa ibn Ka'b al-Tamimi =

8th-century Abbasid commander and governor

Musa ibn Ka'b al-Tamimi موسى بن كعب التميمي

Abbasid Governor of Sind
- In office 751–754
- Monarch: al-Saffah
- Preceded by: Mansur ibn Jumhur
- Succeeded by: Uyayna ibn Musa

Abbasid Governor of Egypt
- In office 758–759
- Monarch: al-Mansur
- Preceded by: Abu Awn Abd al-Malik ibn Yazid
- Succeeded by: Muhammad ibn al-Ash'ath al-Khuza'i

Personal details
- Children: Uyayna
- Parent: Ka'b al-Tamimi

Musa ibn Ka'b al-Tamimi (Arabic: موسى بن كعب التميمي) was an 8th-century Arab commander during the Abbasid Revolution and then provincial governor for the Abbasid Caliphate.

== Biography ==
Musa first appears as one of the "twelve naqibs" who prepared the Abbasid Revolution in Khurasan, and served as a commander when the revolt broke out, fighting in the Battle of the Zab. In the retinue of Abdallah ibn Ali he ended up in Syria. Abdallah placed him as governor for the Jazira, where fought against pro-Umayyad rebels under Abu al-Ward.

Caliph al-Saffah then appointed him as his sahib al-shurta, before sending him to Sind to overthrow the local governor, Mansur ibn Jumhur, who had seized the province during the turmoils of the previous years. Defeated in battle, Mansur fled to the desert, where he died, and Musa succeeded him as governor. Musa remained in Sind until the death of al-Saffah in 754, whereupon he left Sind under his son Uyayna as deputy and returned to Iraq, resuming his position as sahib al-shurta. In 758 the new caliph, al-Mansur, appointed him as governor of Egypt, but his tenure there was brief, as he died within the same year (758/9). His son Uyayna rebelled in Sind and was killed by local Yamanis.

== Sources ==
- Crone, Patricia (1980). Slaves on Horses: The Evolution of the Islamic Polity (1980 ed.). Cambridge: Cambridge University Press. ISBN 978-0521229616.
- Kennedy, Hugh (1998). "Egypt as a province in the Islamic caliphate, 641–868". In Petry, Carl F. (ed.). Cambridge History of Egypt, Volume One: Islamic Egypt, 640–1517. Cambridge: Cambridge University Press. pp. 62–85. ISBN 0-521-47137-0.

Preceded by Mansur ibn Jumhur	Governor of Sind ca. 751–754	Succeeded by Uyayna ibn Musa
Preceded by Abu Awn Abd al-Malik ibn Yazid	Governor of Egypt ca. 758/9	Succeeded by Muhammad ibn al-Ash'ath al-Khuza'i
