= Massacre of Bani Umayya =

Abbasid massacre of the Umayyad dynasty in 750 CE

- Part of the Abbasid revolution and Third Fitna
- Location: Damascus, Bilad al-Sham, Umayyad Caliphate and Jaffa
- Date: 750 CE
- Attack type: Massacre, political purge
- Deaths: nearly the entire Umayyad Dynasty
- Injuries: Survivors only (those who fled to Al-Andalus)
- Perpetrators: Abbasid forces and Abbasid Alids.

The Massacre of Bani Umayya was a large-scale dynastic Political purge carried out by the Abbasids against the Umayyad dynasty in 750 CE, following the collapse of the Umayyad Caliphate. The killings resulted in the near-total extermination of the Umayyad family in the central Islamic lands and marked the definitive transfer of power to the Abbasids.

Medieval and modern historians agree that the purge was deliberate and systematic, intended to eliminate all potential Umayyad claimants to the caliphate. Only a small number of family members survived by fleeing beyond Abbasid control, most notably to Al-Andalus.

== Background ==
The Umayyad Caliphate ruled the Islamic empire from 661 to 750 CE, governing from its capital in Damascus. Although the dynasty presided over rapid territorial expansion, it faced increasing opposition from non-Arab Muslims (mawali), Shiʿi movements, and rival Arab elites who criticized Umayyad rule as hereditary and exclusionary.

The Abbasid Revolution emerged in Khurasan in 747 CE, mobilizing diverse anti-Umayyad factions under the claim of restoring leadership to the family of the Islamic prophet Muhammad through his uncle Abbas ibn Abd al-Muttalib. Abbasid forces defeated the Umayyad army at the Battle of the Zab in 750 CE, effectively ending Umayyad political authority in the east.

== The purge and massacre ==
Following their victory, the Abbasids initiated a systematic campaign to eliminate surviving members of the Umayyad household. According to accounts preserved by historians such as al-Tabari, Umayyad princes and relatives were summoned under assurances of safety before being killed.

One widely reported episode describes a gathering near Damascus at which numerous members of the Umayyad family were massacred, symbolizing the extinction of the dynasty in the core Islamic lands. Abbasid forces pursued remaining Umayyads across Syria, Palestine, and Mesopotamia, ensuring that no viable rival claimant remained.

Modern scholarship characterizes the event as a dynastic extermination rather than a spontaneous act of violence, reflecting common practices of state consolidation in the early medieval period.

== Survivors ==
Despite the scale of the massacre, a small number of Umayyads escaped Abbasid control. The most prominent survivor was Abd al-Rahman I, a grandson of Hisham ibn Abd al-Malik, who fled through North Africa and reached Al-Andalus. In 756 CE, he established the Umayyad Emirate of Córdoba.

The survival of Abd al-Rahman I ensured the continuation of Umayyad political authority outside the Abbasid realm, eventually culminating in the proclamation of the Caliphate of Córdoba in 929 CE.

== Aftermath ==
The massacre removed the principal dynastic threat to Abbasid legitimacy and enabled the rapid consolidation of the new caliphate. However, it also entrenched a precedent for violent succession struggles and purges that would recur throughout Abbasid history.

While Abbasid propaganda portrayed the Umayyads as illegitimate usurpers, later historical reassessment has emphasized the administrative achievements and political complexity of Umayyad rule.

== Historical interpretation ==
Historians generally interpret the Massacre of Bani Umayya as a calculated act of political necessity rather than indiscriminate violence. In the context of early Islamic state formation, the elimination of rival dynasties was often viewed as essential to preventing prolonged civil war.

== See also ==
- Abbasid Revolution
- Umayyad Caliphate
- Abbasid Caliphate
- Battle of the Zab
- Abd al-Rahman I
- Umayyad Emirate of Córdoba

== Bibliography ==
- al-Tabari, Muhammad ibn Jarir (1990). The History of al-Tabari, Volume XXVI: The Waning of the Umayyad Caliphate. State University of New York Press.
- al-Mas'udi, Ali ibn al-Husayn (1989). The Meadows of Gold. Kegan Paul International.
- Kennedy, Hugh (2004). The Prophet and the Age of the Caliphates (2nd ed.). Pearson Longman.
- Crone, Patricia (2012). The Nativist Prophets of Early Islamic Iran. Cambridge University Press.
- Robinson, Chase F. (2003). Islamic Historiography. Cambridge University Press.
- Donner, Fred M. (1981). The Early Islamic Conquests. Princeton University Press.
- Wellhausen, Julius (1927). The Arab Kingdom and Its Fall. University of Calcutta.
