= Al-Hasan ibn Qahtaba =

8th-century Abbasid military leader

Al-Hasan ibn Qahtaba ibn Shabib al-Ta'i (Arabic: الحَسَن بن قَحْطَبَة بن شبيب الطائي) was a senior military leader in the early Abbasid Caliphate.

== Biography ==
He was the son of Qahtaba ibn Shabib al-Ta'i, who along with Abu Muslim led the Abbasid Revolution that toppled the Umayyad Caliphate. Along with his brother Humayd, Hasan was active in the Abbasid cause in Khurasan during the years before the Revolution, serving as a deputy naqib. During the Revolution itself, together with his father he was one of the principal commanders in the campaign that brought the Abbasid armies from Khurasan into Iraq; he took part in the pursuit of Nasr ibn Sayyar and the victory at Nihavand, and despite his father's death in battle against the Umayyad governor Yazid ibn Umar al-Fazari, Hasan led the Khurasani army into Kufa.

After the Revolution, Hasan served the future Caliph al-Mansur (r. 754–775) as deputy governor in Armenia, which he helped pacify, and sided with Mansur against the rebellion of Abdallah ibn Ali in Syria in 754. After this, he was occasionally appointed to the frontier with the Byzantine Empire, where he led the summer raids into Asia Minor in 766, 779 and 780. He is probably also to be identified as the Mouchesias (Μουχεσίας) of Byzantine sources, which indicate that on the orders of Caliph al-Mahdi (r. 775–785) he was engaged in persecutions and forced conversions of Christians in Syria.

Although distinguished as a member of the abna al-dawla, the Abbasid regime's Khurasani elite, and very wealthy—like most Abbasid commanders, he received portions of the newly built capital, Baghdad, as a grant—Hasan played scarcely any political role at court. He died in 797 at the age of 84.

His sons, Muhammad, Ali, and Sa'id, also held gubernatorial positions in various provinces. In the Fourth Fitna, they all sided with al-Amin against al-Ma'mun. As with most of the old Abbasid families, they lost power, although not their wealth, after the triumph of al-Ma'mun in the civil war.

== Sources ==
- Crone, Patricia (1980). Slaves on Horses: The Evolution of the Islamic Polity (1980 ed.). Cambridge: Cambridge University Press. ISBN 978-0521229616.
- Kennedy, Hugh (1986). The Early Abbasid Caliphate: A Political History. Taylor & Francis. ISBN 0-7099-3115-8.
- Lilie, Ralph-Johannes; Ludwig, Claudia; Pratsch, Thomas; Zielke, Beate (2000). "al-Ḥasan ibn Qaḥṭaba (#2542)". Prosopographie der mittelbyzantinischen Zeit: 1. Abteilung (641–867), Band 2: Georgios (# 2183) – Leon (# 4270) (in German). Berlin and Boston: De Gruyter. p. 120. ISBN 978-3-11-016672-9.
- Zarrinkub, Abd al-Husain (1975). "The Arab conquest of Iran and its aftermath Cambridge History of Iran". In Frye, Richard N. (ed.). The Cambridge History of Iran: From the Arab Invasion to the Saljuqs. Vol. 4. Cambridge: Cambridge University Press. pp. 1–56. ISBN 0-521-20093-8.
