= Abdallah ibn Abd al-Rahman ibn Mu'awiya ibn Hudayj =

Abbasid governor of Egypt (769–772) and police Chief (760–769

Abdallah ibn Abd al-Rahman ibn Mu'awiyah ibn Hudayj al-Tujibi عبد الله بن عبد الرحمن بن معاوية بن حديج التجيبي

Sahib al-Shurtah (Chief of security) in Egypt
- In office 749–750
- Monarch: Marwan II
- In office 760–769
- Monarch: Al-Mansur

Abbasid governor of Egypt
- In office 769–772
- Monarch: Al-Mansur
- Preceded by: Yazid ibn Hatim al-Muhallabi
- Succeeded by: Muhammad ibn Abd al-Rahman ibn Mu'awiyah ibn Hudayj al-Tujibi

Personal details
- Died: 772
- Children: Hashim
- Parent: Abd al-Rahman ibn Mu'awiyah (father)

Abdallah ibn Abd al-Rahman ibn Mu'awiyah ibn Hudayj al-Tujibi (Arabic: عبد الله بن عبد الرحمن بن معاوية بن حديج التجيبي) (died January 772) was a governor of Egypt for the Abbasid Caliphate, from 769 to 772.

== Career ==
Abdallah was the scion of a leading family of the Egyptian wujuh, the Arab settler community that dominated affairs in the province in the first centuries of the Islamic era. His grandfather Mu'awiyah ibn Hudayj al-Tujibi was an early Egyptian settler following the Muslim conquest and a leading partisan there of the Uthmanids and Umayyads, while his father Abd al-Rahman served as both a judge (qadi) and chief of security (sahib al-shurtah) in the province.

Abdallah was initially made head of the shurtah following the death of the penultimate Umayyad governor al-Mughirah ibn Ubaydallah al-Fazari in 749, with the Egyptian jund appointing him on an interim basis to provide continuity of leadership until the central government could send a replacement. Subsequent to the overthrow of the Umayyads in 750, he pivoted to the new Abbasid rulers and was briefly returned to office by Salih ibn Ali. A more lengthy tenure over the shurtah followed in 760–769, with both Humayd ibn Qahtabah and Yazid ibn Hatim al-Muhallabi employing him in that position during their respective governorships. Under Yazid he played an instrumental role in defeating a local outbreak of the Alid revolt of 762–763, and he was made acting head of the province when Yazid went on hajj in 765.

Following Yazid's dismissal in 769, Abdallah was appointed by the caliph al-Mansur to replace him as governor, albeit without authority over matters of taxation (kharaj). He remained in that office until his death in 772, upon which he was succeeded by his brother Muhammad.

Abdallah's descendants remained influential in Egypt in the years following his death, with his son Hashim and grandson Hubayrah both serving as sahib al-shurtah at various points; his family seems however to have eventually lost their power as a result the disorders of the Fourth Fitna in the early ninth century.

== Notes ==
Preceded by Yazid ibn Hatim al-Muhallabi	Governor of Egypt; 769–772	Succeeded by Muhammad ibn Abd al-Rahman ibn Mu'awiyah ibn Hudayj al-Tujibi
