= Muhammad ibn Abd al-Rahman ibn Mu'awiya ibn Hudayj =

Abbasid governor of Egypt in 772

Muhammad ibn Abd al-Rahman ibn Mu'awiyah ibn Hudayj al-Tujibi محمد بن عبد الرحمن بن معاوية بن حديج التجيبي

Abbasid Governor of Egypt
- In office February 772 – 18 September 772
- Monarch: Al-Mansur
- Preceded by: Abdallah ibn Abd al-Rahman ibn Mu'awiyah ibn Hudayj al-Tujibi
- Succeeded by: Musa ibn Ulayy ibn Rabah al-Lakhmi

Personal details
- Born: Fustat
- Died: 18 September 772 Fustat, Abbasid Caliphate
- Parent: Abd al-Rahman ibn Mu'awiyah (father)

Military service
- Allegiance: Abbasid Caliphate
- Years of service: 767 – 772

Muhammad ibn Abd al-Rahman ibn Mu'awiyah ibn Hudayj al-Tujibi (Arabic: محمد بن عبد الرحمن بن معاوية بن حديج التجيبي) (died September 772) was a governor of Egypt for the Abbasid Caliphate for a portion of 772.

== Career ==
Muhammad was a member of a leading Arab Egyptian family during the early Islamic era, being the son of Abd al-Rahman ibn Mu'awiya ibn Hudayj al-Tujibi and grandson to Mu'awiyah ibn Hudayj al-Tujibi. His brother Abdallah was a chief of security (shurtah) for Egypt and later served as governor of the province from 769 to 772.

In the history of al-Kindi, Muhammad first appears just after the arrival of the Abbasid Revolution to Egypt in 750, when he was one of several local notables who presented themselves to the new Abbasid governor Salih ibn Ali. In 767 he participated in a failed campaign to suppress a Coptic and Arab revolt at Sakha and was seriously wounded in the fighting. In 771 he was temporarily placed in charge of Egypt when Abdallah departed to visit the caliph al-Mansur in Iraq.

Following the death of Abdallah in 772, Muhammad took over and succeeded him in the governorship, and he shortly afterwards received a formal appointment from al-Mansur confirming him in that position. After a few months in office, he died of an illness and was replaced with Musa ibn Ulayy ibn Rabah al-Lakhmi.

== Notes ==
Preceded by Abdallah ibn Abd al-Rahman ibn Mu'awiyah ibn Hudayj al-Tujibi	Governor of Egypt; 772	Succeeded by Musa ibn Ulayy ibn Rabah al-Lakhmi
