= Isa ibn Luqman al-Jumahi =

Abbasid governor of Egypt

Isa ibn Luqman al-Jumahi عيسى بن لقمان الجمحي

Abbasid Governor of Kufa
- Monarch: Al-Mahdi

Abbasid Governor of Egypt
- In office 778–779
- Monarch: Al-Mahdi
- Preceded by: Musa ibn Ulayy ibn Rabah al-Lakhmi
- Succeeded by: Wadih al-Maskin

Personal details
- Relations: Banu Jumah (tribe)
- Parent: Luqman (father)

Isa ibn Luqman al-Jumahi (Arabic: عيسى بن لقمان الجمحي) was an eighth century official of the Abbasid Caliphate.

A member of the Jumah clan of the Quraysh, he seems to have been a descendant of a rather undistinguished family. He was appointed governor of Kufa by the caliph al-Mahdi in 775–776. In 778 he was made governor of Egypt, and held that position for four months until early 779 when he was dismissed in favor of Wadih.

== Notes ==
Preceded by Musa ibn Ulayy ibn Rabah al-Lakhmi	Governor of Egypt; 778–779	Succeeded by Wadih al-Maskin
