= Humayd ibn Qahtaba =

8th-century Abbasid military leader and governor

Humayd ibn Qahtaba حميد بن قحطبة

Governor of Jazira
- In office 754–755
- Monarch: al-Mansur

Governor of Egypt
- In office 760–762
- Monarch: al-Mansur
- Preceded by: Muhammad ibn al-Ash'ath al-Khuza'i
- Succeeded by: Yazid ibn Hatim al-Muhallabi

Governor of Arminiyah
- In office 766–768
- Monarch: al-Mansur

Governor of Khorasan
- In office 768–776
- Monarchs: al-Mansur, al-Mahdi

Personal details
- Born: Umayyad Caliphate
- Died: 776 Khorasan, Abbasid Caliphate
- Children: Abdallah ibn Humayd ibn Qahtaba
- Parent: Qahtaba ibn Shabib al-Ta'i (father)
- Military career
- Allegiance: Abbasid Caliphate
- Branch: Abbasid Army
- Rank: Military officer

Humayd ibn Qahtaba ibn Shabib al-Ta'i (Arabic: حميد بن قحطبة) was a senior military leader in the early Abbasid Caliphate.

== Biography ==
Humayd was the son of Qahtaba ibn Shabib al-Ta'i, who along with Abu Muslim led the Abbasid Revolution that toppled the Umayyad Caliphate. Along with his brother Hasan, Humayd was active in the Abbasid cause in Khurasan during the years before the Revolution, serving as a deputy naqib.

After the Revolution, Humayd attached himself to the governor of Syria, Abdallah ibn Ali, and even joined him when he rebelled against the Caliph al-Mansur (r. 754–775) in 754. He soon regretted his decision, however, and escaped Abdallah's camp before his final defeat. Nevertheless, he was soon entrusted with governorships by Mansur, first in the Jazira (754/55), where he faced a determined Kharijite rebellion, and then in Egypt (759/61). In 762/63 he served under Isa ibn Musa in the suppression of the rebellion of Muhammad al-Nafs al-Zakiyya. Three years later, he was appointed to Armenia, and in 768, he was named governor of Khurasan, a post he kept until his death in 776. He was briefly succeeded by his son, Abdallah, who later played a prominent role in the civil war of the Fourth Fitna. As with most of the old Abbasid families, they lost power, although not their wealth, after the triumph of al-Ma'mun in the civil war.

== See also ==
- Sanabad (Mashhad)

== Sources ==
- Crone, Patricia (1980). Slaves on Horses: The Evolution of the Islamic Polity (1980 ed.). Cambridge: Cambridge University Press. ISBN 978-0521229616.
- Kennedy, Hugh (1986). The Early Abbasid Caliphate: A Political History. Taylor & Francis. ISBN 0-7099-3115-8.

Preceded by Muhammad ibn al-Ash'ath al-Khuza'i	Governor of Egypt; 760–762	Succeeded by Yazid ibn Hatim al-Muhallabi
