= Wadih (mawla) =

Wadih (Arabic: واضح) was the name of one or more individuals who served the Abbasid Caliphate in the eighth century.

== Individuals ==
Medieval Islamic writers make numerous references to a Wadih being active in the early Abbasid Caliphate. In the majority of circumstances, he is characterized as a mawla (freedman or client), but it is difficult to determine whether the sources are referring to a single individual or to multiple persons. Historian Elton L. Daniel speculated that there were "at least two and perhaps three (or more)" Wadihs extant during this period, and that it is impossible in certain instances to say which was which.

During the reign of the second Abbasid caliph al-Mansur (r. 754–775), Wadih was the mawla assigned to the construction of a quarter of Baghdad in 762. Wadih, mawla amir al-mu'minin, later served as governor of a section of Baghdad and he and his children owned estates in the new city.

According to al-Ya'qubi, Wadih, mawla of al-Mansur, was dispatched by the caliph to govern Armenia and Adharbayjan in the aftermath of a Sanariyya rebellion, remaining there for the duration of al-Mansur's reign. Al-Ya'qubi also specifies that he was one of al-Mansur's officials that were chosen from among his clients. Al-Tabari similarly notes a Wadih, mawla of Abi Ja'far (al-Mansur), citing him as a source of several anecdotes about the caliph.

In 779 Wadih was appointed governor of Egypt by the caliph al-Mahdi (r. 775–785), with jurisdiction over prayers and security (salah) as well as taxation (kharaj). Ibn Taghribirdi refers to him as "Wadih ibn Abdallah al-Mansuri" and describes him as a eunuch (khasi) and mawla of Salih ibn al-Mansur, further noting that he was close to al-Mansur and that he was dismissed as governor after the Egyptians complained about his oppressive administration. He was stripped of office after a few months and replaced with Mansur ibn Yazid ibn Mansur al-Himyari. Al-Ya'qubi adds that Wadih was the governor of Egypt responsible for forwarding money and resources to al-Mahdi during the latter's renovation of the Great Mosque of Mecca, though that event had occurred in 776/7.

In c. 786 Wadih, mawla of Salih ibn al-Mansur, was serving as master of the postal systems (barid) in Egypt when the Alid Idris ibn Abdallah, who was fleeing from the authorities in the aftermath of the Battle of Fakhkh, arrived in the province. Wadih, described at this juncture by al-Tabari as a "vile partisan of the Shi'ites" (rafidi khabith), assisted Idris in his escape, giving him use of the postal mounts to head west to the Maghreb where he later formed an independent state. As a result, Wadih was executed and crucified on the orders of either al-Hadi (r. 785–786) or Harun al-Rashid (r. 786–809).

In al-Tabari's history, a Wadih is the source for an account of the death of al-Mahdi. This Wadih is not referred to as a mawla, but as a member of al-Mahdi's domestic staff (qahraman).

Al-Yaq'ubi himself was the descendant of a Wadih, mawla of al-Mansur, possibly as a grandson although the sources are disputed. The historian is the sole source for certain pieces of information about Wadih, and according to Ibn al-Daya he repeatedly cited Wadih as a transmitter of accounts.

== Notes ==
Preceded by Isa ibn Luqman al-Jumahi	Governor of Egypt; 779	Succeeded by Mansur ibn Yazid ibn Mansur al-Himyari
