= Mansur ibn Yazid ibn Mansur al-Himyari =

Abbasid official and al-Mahdi's Maternal cousin

Al-Ru'ayni Mansur ibn Yazid ibn Mansur al-Himyari منصور بن يزيد بن منصور الحميري

Governor of Egypt
- In office 779 – 779 (two months)
- Monarch: al-Mahdi
- Preceded by: Wadih al-Maskin
- Succeeded by: Yahya ibn Sa'id al-Harashi

Governor of Yemen
- In office 781/2–783
- Monarch: al-Mahdi

Governor of Khorasan
- In office 796–797
- Monarch: Harun al-Rashid

Personal details
- Relations: al-Mahdi (maternal cousin)
- Parent: Yazid ibn Mansur al-Himyari (father)

Mansur ibn Yazid ibn Mansur al-Himyari al-Ru'ayni (Arabic: منصور بن يزيد بن منصور الحميري الرعيني) was an eighth century official for the Abbasid Caliphate.

He was the son of Yazid ibn Mansur, a maternal uncle of the third Abbasid caliph al-Mahdi. In 779 he spent two months as governor of Egypt. Between 781/2 and 783 he was governor of the Yemen, and in 796 he briefly served as the governor of Khurasan.

== Notes ==
Preceded by Wadih al-Maskin	Governor of Egypt; 779	Succeeded by Yahya ibn Dawud al-Kharsi
