= Yazid ibn Hatim al-Muhallabi =

Abbasid Provincial governor (died 787)

Yazid ibn Hatim al-Muhallabi يزيد بن حاتم المهلبي

Governor of Adharbayjan
- Monarch: al-Mansur

Governor of Egypt
- In office 762–769
- Monarch: al-Mansur
- Preceded by: Humayd ibn Qahtaba
- Succeeded by: Abdallah ibn Abd al-Rahman ibn Mu'awiyah ibn Hudayj al-Tujibi

Governor of Ifriqiya and Maghrib
- In office 771–787
- Monarchs: al-Mansur, al-Mahdi, al-Hadi, Harun al-Rashid
- Preceded by: Umar ibn Hafs Hazarmard
- Succeeded by: Dawud ibn Yazid ibn Hatim al-Muhallabi

Personal details
- Died: March 13, 787 Kairouan, Ifriqiya, Abbasid Caliphate
- Children: Dawud
- Parent: Hatim al-Muhallabi (father)
- Military career
- Allegiance: Abbasid Caliphate
- Branch: Abbasid army
- Rank: Commander

Yazid ibn Hatim al-Muhallabi (Arabic: يزيد بن حاتم المهلبي) (died March 13, 787) was a member of the Muhallabid family who served as the governor of Adharbayjan, Egypt (762–769) and Ifriqiya (771–787) for the Abbasid Caliphate.

Yazid was a close associate of the future caliph al-Mansur (reigned 754–775) and was present in the latter's camp during the surrender of Wasit in 750. He was subsequently appointed as governor of Adharbayjan, where he initiated a program to transfer Yemeni Arabs from Basra and settle them in the province. In 755 he was one of the commanders who attempted to put down the Kharijite rebel Mulabbid ibn Harmalah al-Shaybani in the region of Mosul, but he was defeated and forced to withdraw.

In 762 al-Mansur appointed him as the governor of Egypt. He remained in this position until 769, making his eight-year tenure the longest of any governor of the province in the early Abbasid period. As a trusted aide of the caliph, his appointment was intended to secure Abbasid control of Egypt, especially against Alid agitation, which his predecessor, Humayd ibn Qahtaba had ignored. The Alid unrest eventually culminated in the Revolt of Muhammad the Pure Soul in Medina and Basra in 762–763, but Yazid and his sahib al-shurta, Abdallah ibn Abd al-Rahman al-Tujibi, succeeded in thwarting the plans of the Alid party in Egypt from launching a revolt in Fustat as well. In 767, Yazid sent an army into the rebellious Bashmur, but it was defeated and forced to retreat.

Following the death of the governor of Ifriqiya, 'Umar ibn Hafs al-Muhallabi, at the hands of Kharijite rebels in 771, al-Mansur appointed Yazid to that position and dispatched him to the province with a massive army. After arriving in Tripoli, Yazid advanced against the Ibadis in early 772 and engaged them in a major battle, killing their leader Abu Hatim Yaqub ibn Labib al-Khariji and a large number of the rebels. After spending a month hunting down any surviving Ibadis, he proceeded to the provincial capital al-Qayrawan and entered it, and successfully established his rule over the province.

Yazid spent the remainder of his life as governor of Ifriqiya. In contrast to his predecessors, his tenure saw a period of peace and stability for the province; a Kharijite uprising in 773 and a rebellion by the Warfajuma Berbers in the Zab in 781 were both suppressed. During his administration he organized the markets of al-Qayrawan and restored the city mosque.

Yazid died in al-Qayrawan on March 13, 787, after a reign of fifteen years and three months, and was buried near the city gate. Following his death, his son Dawud briefly succeeded him as governor of Ifriqiya, before being replaced with Rawh ibn Hatim al-Muhallabi.

== Sources ==
- Ibn al-Athir, 'Izz al-Din (1987). Al-Kamil fi al-Tarikh, Vol. 5 (in Arabic). Beirut: Dar al-'Ilmiyyah.
- Kennedy, Hugh (1981). The Early 'Abbasid Caliphate: A Political History. London: Croom Helm. ISBN 0-389-20018-2.
- Kennedy, Hugh (1998). "Egypt as a province in the Islamic caliphate, 641–868". In Petry, Carl F. (ed.). Cambridge History of Egypt, Volume One: Islamic Egypt, 640–1517. Cambridge: Cambridge University Press. pp. 62–85. ISBN 0-521-47137-0.
- Ibn Khallikan (1842). Ibn Khallikan's Biographical Dictionary, Translated from the Arabic. Vol. I. Translated by Baron Mac Guckin de Slane. Paris: Oriental Translation Fund of Great Britain and Ireland. OCLC 1184199260.
- Ibn Khallikan (1871). Ibn Khallikan's Biographical Dictionary, Translated from the Arabic. Vol. IV. Translated by Baron Mac Guckin de Slane. Paris: Oriental Translation Fund of Great Britain and Ireland. OCLC 1204583307.
- Al-Kindi, Muhammad ibn Yusuf (1912). Guest, Rhuvon (ed.). The Governors and Judges of Egypt (in Arabic). Leyden and London: E. J. Brill.
- Megally, Mounir (1991). "Bashmuric Revolts". In Aziz Suryal Atiya (ed.). The Coptic Encyclopedia. Vol. 2. New York: Macmillan Publishers. cols. 349b–351b.
- Williams, John Alden, ed. (1985). The History of al-Ṭabarī, Volume XXVII: The ʿAbbāsid Revolution, A.D. 743–750/A.H. 126–132. SUNY Series in Near Eastern Studies. Albany, New York: State University of New York Press. ISBN 978-0-87395-884-4.
- McAuliffe, Jane Dammen, ed. (1995). The History of al-Ṭabarī, Volume XXVIII: The ʿAbbāsid Authority Affirmed: The Early Years of al-Mansūr, A.D. 753–763/A.H. 136–145. SUNY Series in Near Eastern Studies. Albany, New York: State University of New York Press. ISBN 978-0-7914-1895-6.
- Kennedy, Hugh, ed. (1990). The History of al-Ṭabarī, Volume XXIX: Al-Mansūr and al-Mahdī, A.D. 763–786/A.H. 146–169. SUNY Series in Near Eastern Studies. Albany, New York: State University of New York Press. ISBN 978-0-7914-0142-2.
- Al-Ya'qubi, Ahmad ibn Abu Ya'qub (1883). Houtsma, M. Th. (ed.). Historiae, Vol. 2 (in Arabic). Leiden: Brill.

Preceded by Humayd ibn Qahtaba	Governor of Egypt; 762–769	Succeeded by Abdallah ibn Abd al-Rahman al-Tujibi
Preceded by Abu Hatim Yaqub ibn Labib al-Khariji (rebel)	Governor of Ifriqiya; 772–787	Succeeded by Dawud ibn Yazid ibn Hatim al-Muhallabi
