= Musa ibn Ulayy ibn Rabah al-Lakhmi =

Abbasid governor of Egypt and scholar

Abbasid Governor of Egypt
- In office 772–778
- Monarchs: al-Mansur, al-Mahdi
- Preceded by: Muhammad ibn Abd al-Rahman ibn Mu'awiyah ibn Hudayj al-Tujibi
- Succeeded by: Isa ibn Luqman al-Jumahi

Personal details
- Born: Ifriqiya
- Died: 779/780 Alexandria
- Parent: Ulayy ibn Rabah al-Lakhmi (father)

Abu Abd al-Rahman Musa ibn Ulayy ibn Rabah al-Lakhmi (Arabic: أبو عبد الرحمن موسى بن علي بن رباح اللخمي) (c. 707-779/80) was an Islamic scholar.

== Career ==
Musa was born in North Africa to Ulayy ibn Rabah al-Lakhmi, an early hadith narrator and Umayyad confidant. His father's name had originally been Ali, but was changed to Ulayy in order to escape anti-Alid sentiment in the Umayyad era.

During his lifetime Musa narrated hadith on the authority of his father, as well as from Ibn Shihab al-Zuhri, Muhammad ibn Munkadir, Yazid ibn Abi Habib, Yazid ibn Abi Mansur, and Hibban ibn Abi Jabalah. He was considered a highly reliable (thiqa thiqa) hadith transmitter by the traditionalist Ahmad ibn Hanbal and "reliable, God willing" (thiqa-in-sha'a llah) by Ibn Sa'd.

In 772 Musa was selected by the terminally ill governor of Egypt, Muhammad ibn Abd al-Rahman al-Tujibi, to succeed him upon his death, and he was subsequently confirmed in that position by the Abbasid caliph al-Mansur. He remained as governor over the next six years, during which he put down a Coptic revolt near Rashid in 773, before being dismissed by the caliph al-Mahdi in 778.

He died in 779/780 in Alexandria.

== Notes ==
Preceded by Muhammad ibn Abd al-Rahman ibn Mu'awiyah ibn Hudayj al-Tujibi	Governor of Egypt; 772–778	Succeeded by Isa ibn Luqman al-Jumahi
