= Kemah, Erzincan =

Kemah Ani-Kamakh
- Municipality
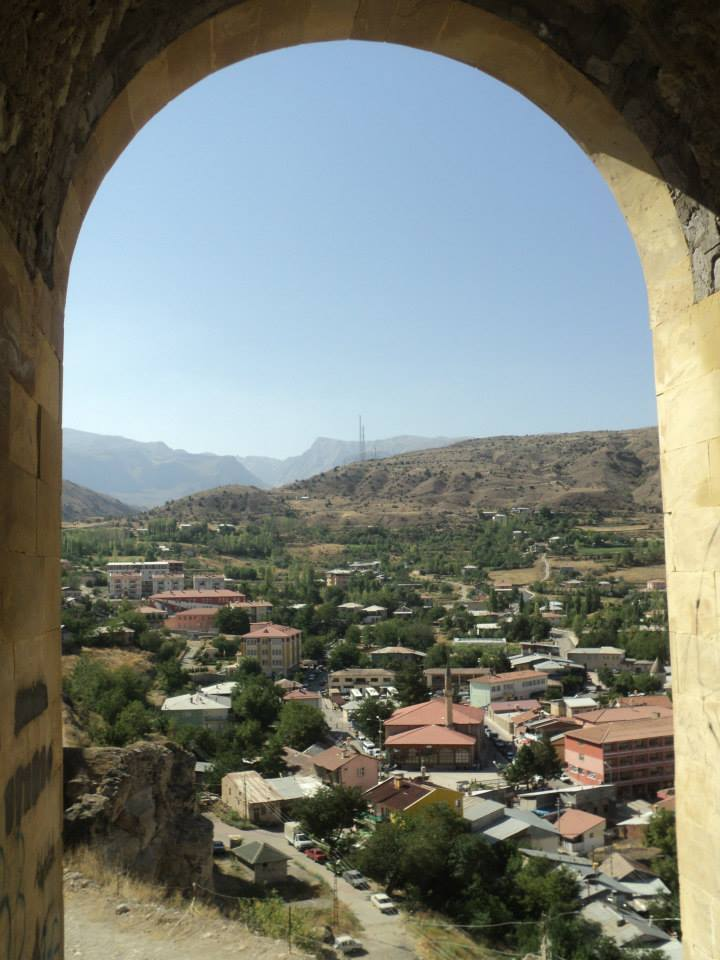

- Location within Turkey
- Coordinates: 39°36′10″N 39°02′08″E
- Country: Turkey
- Province: Erzincan
- District: Kemah

Government
  - Mayor: Osman Kemal Aslan (MHP)
- Elevation: 1,130 m (3,710 ft)
- Population (2022): 2,929
- Time zone: UTC+3 (TRT)
- Postal code: 24400
- Area code: 0446
- Website: www.kemah.bel.tr

Kemah known historically as Ani-Kamakh (Armenian: Անի-Կամախ), Gamakh, Kamacha or Kamachon (Greek: Κάμαχα, Κάμαχον) is a town in Erzincan Province in the Eastern Anatolia region of Turkey. It is the seat of Kemah District. Its population is 2,929 (2022). The town is located almost in the centre of Erzincan Province.

== Neighborhoods ==
The town is divided into the neighborhoods of Aşağıgedik, Beklimçay, Cirgişin, Çarşı, Göğüsbağı, Karşıbağ, Mektepönü, Ortagedik, Pörhenkbaşı and Yukarı.

== History ==
=== Late Bronze ===
In ancient times, the town was known as Ani-Kamakh, and was the cult center of the Armenian goddess Anahit (Ani). It may be what the Hittites referred to as Kummaha, one of the cities of Azzi (if that was not just a variant of Kummuh).

=== Classical ===
The necropolis of Armenia's Arsacid dynasty was located in Kemah, including the tomb of Tiridates III who was instrumental in the conversion of the Armenian people to Christianity.

=== Medieval ===
During the early Middle Ages, Kemah was a strategically important border fortress in the border wars between the Byzantines and the Umayyads and Abbasids. It first fell to the Muslims in 679 and changed hands frequently until the mid-9th century (cf. Siege of Kamacha (766)), when Byzantine control was consolidated. According to Constantine VII, in the late 9th century Kemah formed a tourma in the thema of Koloneia. Under Emperor Leo VI the Wise, Kemah was joined with the district of Keltzene to form the new thema of Mesopotamia. Little is known of the site thereafter, except that it was the seat of a bishopric named "Armenia". The Byzantines lost control of the area following the Battle of Manzikert in 1071.

=== Modern ===
The Kemah Gorge was the scene of massacres during the Armenian genocide. In one instance, 25,000 Armenians were killed in one day by throwing the victims off a steep gorge and into the Euphrates river.

== Demographics ==
In the 19th century, Armenian Catholic geographer Rev. Ghukas Injijian wrote that the Muslim population in Kemah were of Armenian origin but had converted to Islam during the devastation caused by the Persian-Ottoman wars in the sixteenth and seventeenth centuries.
