= Museum with No Frontiers =

International non-profit organization

Museum With No Frontiers (MWNF) is an international non-profit organisation founded on the initiative of Eva Schubert in 1995 in the context of the Barcelona Process Euro-Mediterranean Partnership relaunched as the Union for the Mediterranean). MWNF provides a platform that enables all partners to interact productively and contribute to a transnational presentation of history, art and culture based on equal voices and the equal visibility of all concerned. For that purpose, MWNF develops exhibition formats that do not require moving the artworks, but instead, artefacts in museums, monuments and archaeological sites are presented in situ (Exhibition Trails) or in a virtual environment (the MWNF Virtual Museum).

== History ==
The MWNF Virtual Museum, so far the largest online museum, was launched in 2005. It enables partners from different countries to present a joint theme taking into consideration the perspectives of all concerned and to create virtual ensembles that otherwise could not exist. The first thematic section, www.discoverislamicart.org, was completed in cooperation with partners from 14 countries. Discover Islamic Art presents the heritage of Islam not only in southern Mediterranean countries but also in Europe. Its Database comprises 850 artefacts and 385 monuments and archaeological sites relating to almost 1,300 years of history, from the Umayyad caliphate (AH 41–132 / AD 661–750) until the end of the Ottoman Empire (AH 1340 / AD 1922). Eighteen Virtual Exhibitions present the history, art and cultural legacy of the great Islamic dynasties of the Mediterranean. Descriptions are available in Arabic, English, French and Spanish; for the Virtual Exhibitions also in German, Italian, Portuguese, Turkish and Swedish.

The Virtual Museum's second thematic section, www.discoverbaroqueart.org, was inaugurated in 2010. The newest section, sharinghistory.org, has been online since April 2015.

Exhibition Trail is the name of another exhibition format set up by MWNF as a pioneering method to promote cultural tourism. The selected items – artefacts in museums, monuments and archaeological sites – are presented in situ, where the visitor discovers them in their natural environment. Each Exhibition Trail has an accompanying travel book, designed and written by local experts of each country, to be used as a thematic guide during the visit. So far 18 Exhibition Trails have been launched in 11 countries offering a total of 164 thematic itineraries and turning 2,070 local museums, monuments and archaeological sites – to a large extent unknown to non-experts – into key elements of local development.

The registered MWNF office is based in Vienna but a small MWNF team operates around the globe. MWNF is supported by the members of its Board and Honorary Committee and by a committed network of Partners, Friends and Supporters.
