= Naqib =

Naqib, plural naqib, is an Arabic word meaning "He who investigates, verifies". It can refer to:

== Historical titles ==
- The "twelve naqibs", the leading missionaries of the Hashimiyya movement who prepared the Abbasid Revolution in Khurasan.
- The naqib al-ashraf, an honorary position in various Islamic states, given to the head representative of the ashraf, the descendants of Muhammad.

== Surname ==
- Mullah Naqib (1950–2007), Afghan mujahideen commander
- Falah Hassan al-Naqib (born 1956), Iraqi politician
- Zuhayr Talib Abd al-Sattar al-Naqib, director of Iraqi military intelligence
