= Robert Gleave =

Islamic studies scholar

Robert Gleave is a professor of Arabic Studies in the Institute of Arab and Islamic Studies at the University of Exeter.

== Works ==
- Islam and Literalism: Literal Meaning and Interpretation in Islamic Legal Theory (2012)
- Scripturalist Islam: The History and Doctrines of the Akhbārī Shiʿī School (2007)
- Inevitable Doubt: Two Theories of Shīʻī Jurisprudence (2000)
