= Nashwan al-Himyari =

12th-century Yemeni theologian

- نشوان ابن سعيد الحميري
- Born: Huth, Sana'a
- Died: 1178; Ḥaydan, Ṣaʿdah
- Known for: al-Qaṣīdah al-Ḥimyarīyah (The Himyarite Ode)
- Notable work: Shams al-'ulum

Nashwān ibn Saʻīd al-Ḥimyarī (Arabic: نشوان ابن سعيد الحميري) was a Yemeni theologian, judge, philologist, poet and historian.

== Life ==
He was a member of a nobel Yemeni family from Uawt near Sanaa. He is said to have some Mu'tazili views. He wrote a Qur'an commentary and compiled several works on theological, philological, historical and other topics. He died in 1178 C.E.

== Books ==
- Shams al-'ulum wa-dawa' kalam al-'Arab min al- kulum ('The sun of Wisdom and Remedy for the Arabic Language's Lesions').
- al-Tabsirah fi al-Deen lilmubsireen, fi al-Rad ala al-ḍalamt al-munkreen
- Kitāb at-Tibyān. (Quran commentary book)

== See also ==
- Abu Muhammad al-Hasan al-Hamdani
