= Karl Vilhelm Zetterstéen =

Swedish professor and orientalist (1866–1953)

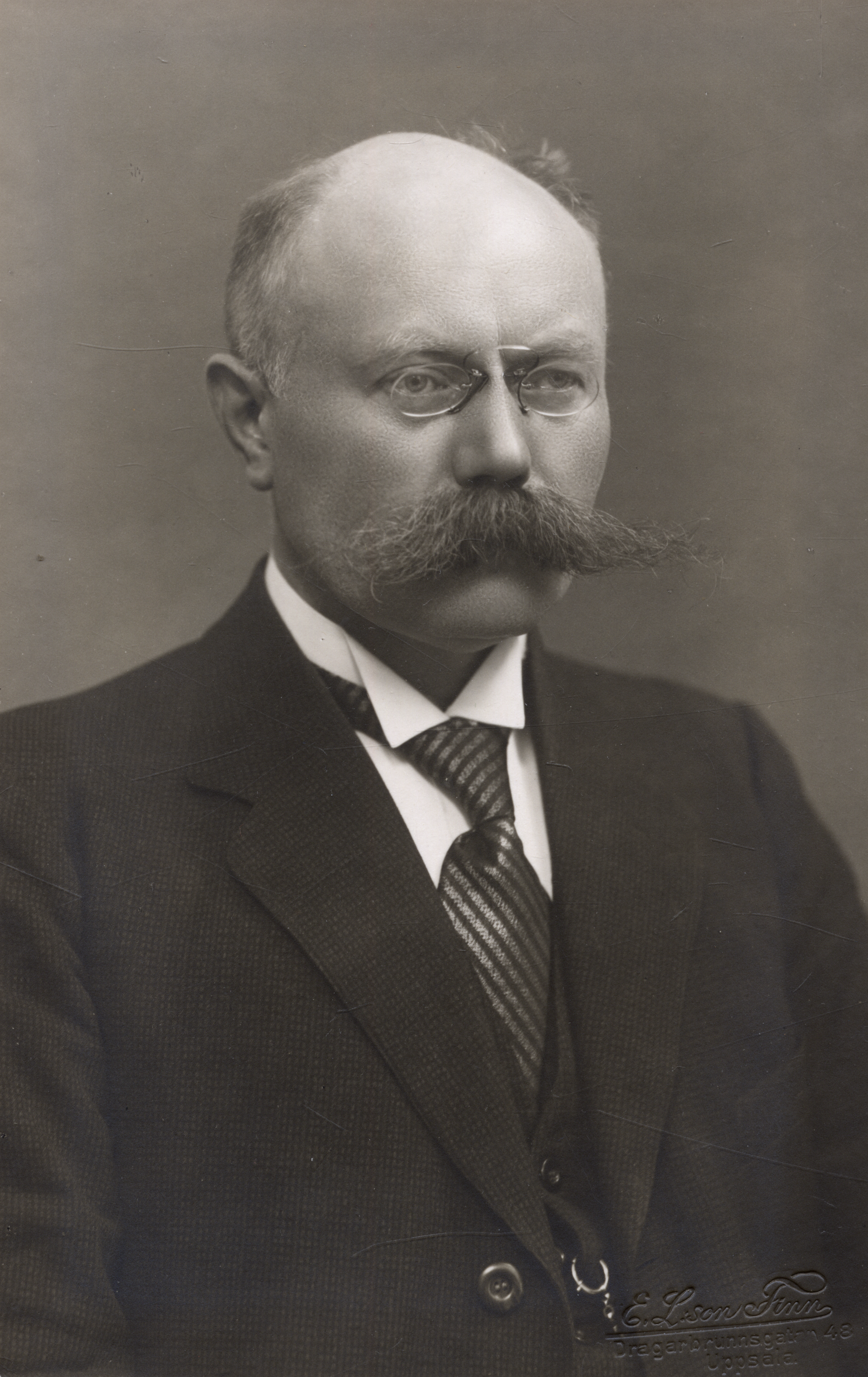
Karl Vilhelm Zetterstéen

Karl Vilhelm Zetterstéen (18 August 1866 – June 1, 1953) was a Swedish professor and orientalist.

== Biography ==
Zetterstéen was born at Orsa in Dalarna, Sweden. He began his studies at Uppsala University in 1884, became a Ph.D. and docent of Semitic languages in 1895. He also studied under professor Eduard Sachau (1845–1930) at the University of Berlin. He was acting professor of Oriental languages at Lund University 1895-1904 and professor of Semitic languages in Uppsala 1904–1931. He became emeritus 1931.

As a semitist, Zetterstéen was foremost an Arabic philologist, but he was also well-oriented in non-Semitic languages such as Persian, Turkish and Nubian. Beside a large number of text editions and studies, he published a Swedish translation of the Qur'an and wrote several articles in the Nordisk familjebok as well as a number of popular works.

== Translations & Editions ==
- Zawāwī (al-), Yaḥyʹa ibn ʻAbd al-Muʻṭī (1900), Zetterstéen, KV (ed.), al-Durrah al-alfīyah fī ʻilm al-ʻarabīyah (thesis, 1895) (in Arabic), translated by Zetterstéen, KV, Leipzig: J.C. Hinrichs.
- Qur'an (Stockholm, 1917)
- Refik, Ahmet (1920) [1919], Baltadjy Mehemed pascha och Peter den store 1711-1911 (from Turkish) (in Swedish), Karolinska förbundet yearbook.
- Refik, Ahmet (1922), "Karl Järnhuvud i Turkiet", Le Monde Oriental (in Swedish) (XVI), translated by Zetterstéen, K.V.
- Hussein, Taha (2012), "Dagarna ('al-Ayyām')", Litteratur, Idéhistoria och Religion (in Swedish and Arabic), translated by Zetterstéen, K.V., University of Gothenburg
- Ibn Sa'd, Muḥammad (1905). Sachau, Eduard; Zettersteen, K.V.; Brocklemann, C.; Horovitz, J.; Lippert, J.; Meissner, B.; Mittwoch, E.; Schwally, F. (eds.). Biographien Muhammeds, seiner Gefährten und der späteren Träger des Islams, bis zum Jahre 230 der Flucht. (Kitāb al-ṭabaqāt al-kabīr) (in Arabic). Leiden: Brill.
- Shams al-'ulum wa-dawa' kalam al-'Arab min al- kulum (‘The sun of Wisdom and Remedy for the Arabic Language's Lesions’) by Nashwān ibn Saʻīd al-Ḥimyarī*Ḥimyarī (al-), Nashwān ibn Saʻīd (1951). Zetterstéen, K.V. (ed.). Šams al-ʻulūm wa-dawāʼ kalām al-ʻArab min al-kulūm (in Arabic). Leiden: Brill. OCLC 615321417.
