= Abd Allah ibn Ali =

Abbasid governor of Syria (c.712–764)

Abd Allah ibn Ali عبد الله بن علي

Abbasid governor of Syria
- In office 750–754
- Monarch: al-Saffah
- Succeeded by: Salih ibn Ali

Personal details
- Born: c. 712
- Died: 764 (aged 52)
- Resting place: Bab al-Sham cemetery, Baghdad, Abbasid Caliphate (modern-day Iraq)
- Parent: Ali ibn Abd Allah ibn al-Abbas
- Relatives: Muhammad ibn Ali (brother); Salih ibn Ali (brother); Abd al-Samad ibn Ali (brother); Dawud ibn Ali (brother)

Military service
- Allegiance: Abbasid Caliphate
- Years of service: 750–754
- Rank: General
- Battles/wars: Abbasid Revolution; Battle of the Zab

Abū Muḥammad ʿAbd Allāh ibn ʿAlī (Arabic: أبو محمد عبد الله بن علي; fl. 712 – 764 CE) was a member of the Abbasid dynasty, and played a leading role in its rise to power during the Abbasid Revolution. As governor of Syria, he consolidated Abbasid control over the province, eliminating the remnants of the Umayyad dynasty and suppressing pro-Umayyad uprisings. After the death of his nephew and first Abbasid caliph, al-Saffah, in 754, he launched a bid for the caliphal title against al-Saffah's brother, al-Mansur, but was defeated and imprisoned. He was killed in 764.

== Role in the Abbasid Revolution ==
Abd Allah was a member of the Abbasid family, and uncle to the first two Abbasid caliphs, al-Saffah (r. 750–754) and al-Mansur (r. 754–775).

By early 749, the anti-Umayyad uprising that had begun under Abu Muslim in Khurasan had prevailed in the eastern lands of the Caliphate, and the Khurasani armies swept west across Persia to the borders of Iraq. In October 749, al-Saffah was proclaimed Caliph at Kufa, and quickly gained the acceptance of Abu Muslim and the Kufans, thereby forestalling an Alid bid for control of the revolution. To cement Abbasid control, al-Saffah now appointed members of his own family to command the armies: his brother, the future al-Mansur, was sent to lead the Siege of Wasit, while Abd Allah was sent to confront the Umayyad caliph Marwan II (r. 744–750) in the Jazira.

Thus Abd Allah held the supreme command in the decisive Battle of the Zab, where the Abbasid forces defeated Marwan II, and led the pursuit of Marwan, first to Syria. After a brief siege, he captured the Umayyad capital of Damascus by force, killing the city's governor and Marwan's son-in-law, al-Walid ibn Mu'awiya. He then pursued Marwan into Palestine, forcing him to flee to Egypt. His brother Salih followed Marwan to Egypt, where the Umayyad ruler was captured and executed.

== Governorship of Syria and suppression of Umayyad risings ==
As the first Abbasid governor of Syria, Abd Allah proved himself an implacable enemy of the Umayyads, vigorously persecuting the family's members. According to the Swedish Orientalist Karl Vilhelm Zetterstéen, "he shrank from no method to exterminate them root and branch. During his stay in Palestine, he had about eighty of them murdered at one time." So effective was this persecution, that only a single member of the dynasty, Caliph Hisham ibn Abd al-Malik's grandson Abd al-Rahman ibn Mu'awiya, managed to escape death and flee to al-Andalus, where he established a new Umayyad dynasty. Abd Allah ibn Ali presented the mass killings of Umayyads as retaliation for Husayn's death at Karbala. According to al-Baladhuri, he also personally killed the murderer of Zayd ibn Ali, Husayn's grandson, in retaliation for Zayd's death.

This harsh suppression and the depredations of the victorious Khurasani soldiers soon provoked an uprising by the Syrian tribes, led by the governor of Jund Qinnasrin, Abu'l-Ward ibn al-Kawthar. They were joined by Abu Muhammad al-Sufyani, a descendant of Caliph Mu'awiya I, who put himself forward as a candidate for reviving the Umayyad Caliphate. The rebels were at first successful, routing an Abbasid army under Abd Allah's brother Abd al-Samad near Qinnasrin, but Abd Allah finally dealt a heavy defeat to them at Marj al-Akhram in late 750. Abu'l-Ward fell, while Abu Muhammad fled to the desert. A nephew of Abu Muhammad, al-Abbas ibn Muhammad, rose up in Aleppo shortly after, but al-Mansur, who governed the Jazira, sent troops that quelled the uprising before Abd Allah could arrive. Abd Allah then marched onto the frontier fortress of Sumaysat, where disparate Umayyad loyalists had gathered under Ishaq ibn Muslim al-Uqayli. In the event, a negotiated settlement was reached between Ishaq and al-Mansur, and many of the pro-Umayyad leaders were then accepted into the ranks of the Abbasids. Another uprising, headed by Aban ibn Mu'awiya, a grandson of Hisham ibn Abd al-Malik, erupted in the summer of 751 near Sumaysat, forcing Abd Allah to interrupt a raid into Byzantine territories to suppress it. Another Umayyad loyalist, Abd al-Samad ibn Muhammad ibn al-Hajjaj ibn Yusuf, managed to escape defeat and capture until 755.

== Bid for the Caliphate ==
Despite the recurrence of pro-Umayyad revolts in the Jazira, over the next few years Abd Allah was apparently able to secure the loyalty of the Syrian tribal nobility, and the province remained mostly calm. By the time of al-Saffah's death in June 754, he ranked, along with al-Mansur and the viceroy of the east, Abu Muslim, as one of the three most powerful men in the Caliphate. Al-Saffah died on his way to Mecca, and on his deathbed he nominated al-Mansur as his heir. At the time, Abd Allah was preparing a major campaign against the Byzantine Empire, and had assembled a large army for this purpose. Upon receiving news of al-Saffah's death, Abd Allah proclaimed himself as Caliph, claiming that al-Saffah had promised him the succession as a reward for his role in the overthrow of Marwan II.

The veracity of Abd Allah's claim and the level of legitimacy he enjoyed vis-à-vis al-Mansur is difficult to assess following the prevalence of hostile traditions after his defeat, but, as P. Cobb comments, "what all accounts agree on is that the succession to al-Saffah was not solidly secured before his death", and there are indications that Abd Allah "had portrayed himself as an obvious successor [...] in the few years prior to al-Saffah's death." Abd Allah enjoyed broad support in Syria, both by the native Syro-Jaziran troops and the Syrian elites who sought to regain the privileged position they had held under the Umayyads, as well as the Khurasani soldiers he had commanded during the Revolution.

As Abd Allah's army began their march on Iraq, al-Mansur turned to Abu Muslim for support. Although the Caliph distrusted Abu Muslim's power, the fact that he was universally popular with the Khurasani soldiers of the Revolution made him an ideal candidate to confront Abd Allah and rally most of the Khurasani soldiery, which formed the regime's main pillar, to the Caliph's side. The two armies met at Nisibis in November 754. Abd Allah's army was riven with doubt, as the Khurasanis were loath to fight Abu Muslim. Indeed, according to Zetterstéen, Abd Allah "is said to have killed 17,000 Khurasanis in his army, because he feared they would never fight against Abu Muslim". The Syrians still resented their defeat at Abd Allah's hands at the Zab. In the words of Hugh N. Kennedy, Abd Allah "suspected treachery all round and fled before the battle really developed", seeking refuge in Basra, where another brother of his, Sulayman, was governor. Despite the victory just gained in his name, the wily al-Mansur moved quickly to eliminate Abu Muslim, his chief remaining rival. A few months later, Abu Muslim was persuaded to come to the caliphal court, where he was murdered.

Abd Allah remained in Basra under his brother's protection until the latter was dismissed, two years later. Abd Allah was now imprisoned on al-Mansur's orders, until, in 764, he was "taken into a house that had been purposely undermined; it fell down on him and buried him under the ruins" (Zetterstéen). At the time of his death, he was said to be 52 years old. He was buried in the cemetery at the Bab al-Sham ("Gate of Syria"), marking the first burial at that site.

Despite Abd Allah's rebellion, he was succeeded in Syria by his brother Salih and his family, who remained as the paramount Abbasid potentates in the province for the next half-century.

== Sources ==
- Cobb, Paul M. (2001). White Banners: Contention in 'Abbāsid Syria, 750–880. Albany, NY: State University of New York Press. ISBN 0-7914-4880-0.
- Grohmann, Adolph & Kennedy, Hugh (1995). "Ṣāliḥ b. ʿAlī". In Bosworth, C. E.; van Donzel, E.; Heinrichs, W. P. & Lecomte, G. (eds.). The Encyclopaedia of Islam, Second Edition. Volume VIII: Ned–Sam. Leiden: E. J. Brill. p. 985. ISBN 978-90-04-09834-3.
- Kennedy, Hugh N. (1986). The Early Abbasid Caliphate: A Political History. London and Sydney: Croom Helm. ISBN 0-7099-3115-8.
- Kennedy, Hugh (2004) [1986]. The Prophet and the Age of the Caliphates: The Islamic Near East from the 6th to the 11th Century (Second ed.). Harlow: Longman. ISBN 978-0-582-40525-7.
- Kennedy, Hugh, ed. (1990). The History of al-Ṭabarī, Volume XXIX: Al-Mansūr and al-Mahdī, A.D. 763–786/A.H. 146–169. SUNY Series in Near Eastern Studies. Albany, New York: State University of New York Press. ISBN 978-0-7914-0142-2.
- Zetterstéen, K.V. (1987). "ʿAbd Allāh b. ʿAlī". In Houtsma, Martijn Theodoor (ed.). E.J. Brill's first encyclopaedia of Islam, 1913–1936, Volume I: A–Bābā Beg. Leiden: BRILL. pp. 22–23. ISBN 90-04-08265-4.
- Gleave, Robert (2015). Violence in Islamic Thought from the Qur'an to the Mongols. Edinburgh University Press. ISBN 978-0-7486-9424-2.
- Williams, John Alden, ed. (1985). The History of al-Ṭabarī, Volume XXVII: The ʿAbbāsid Revolution, A.D. 743–750/A.H. 126–132. SUNY Series in Near Eastern Studies. Albany, New York: State University of New York Press. ISBN 978-0-87395-884-4.
- Ibn Sa'd, Muhammad (2000). Kitāb al-Ṭabaqāt al-Kabīr: The Men of Madina. Vol. 2. Translated by Aisha Bewley. Ta-Ha Publishers. ISBN 1-897940-91-2.
