= Abbasid revolution =

747–750 overthrow of the Umayyad caliphate

- Part of the Third Fitna
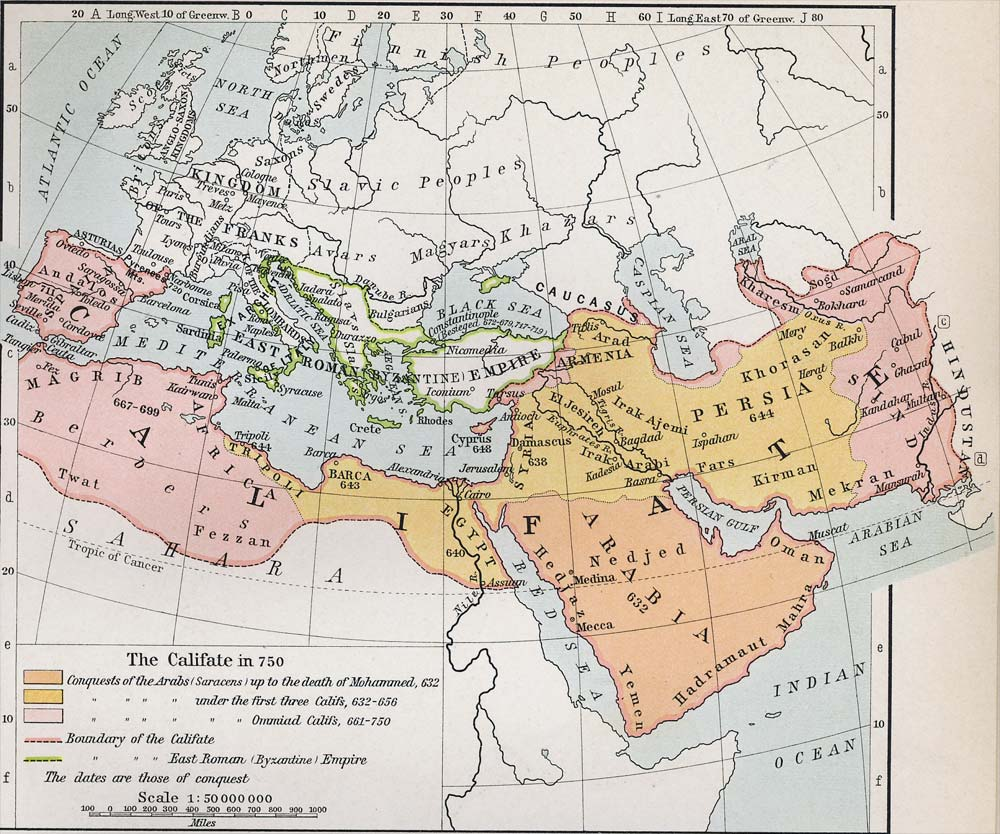
- The Caliphate in 750
Date	9 June 747—July 750
Location	Greater Khorasan, Iran, Iraq
Result	Abbasid victory

Belligerents
Abbasid Hashimiyya	Umayyad Caliphate

Commanders and leaders
Al-Saffah; Abd Allah ibn Ali; Abu Muslim al-Khurasani; Qahtaba ibn Shabib †; Al-Hasan ibn Qahtaba; Humayd ibn Qahtaba; Abu Awn Abd al-Malik	Marwan II (executed); Nasr ibn Sayyar #; Yazid ibn Umar ibn Hubayra (executed); Hawthara ibn Suhayl (executed)

The Abbasid revolution (Arabic: اَلثَّوْرَة اَلْعَبَّاسِيَّةِ, romanized: aṯ-Ṯawra al-ʿAbbāsiyyah), (Note: Also called the Movement of the Men of the Black Raiment (ثَوْرَةُ أَصْحَابِ السَّوَاد, Ṯawrat ʾAṣḥābi al-Sawād)) was the overthrow of the Umayyad Caliphate (661–750), the second major caliphate, by the Hashimiyya movement, resulting in the establishment of the Abbasid Caliphate (750–1517), the third major caliphate.

The Abbasid revolution originated in the eastern province of Khorasan in the mid-8th century, fuelled by widespread discontent with Umayyad rule. The revolt was led by the Abbasid dynasty, descendants of al-ʿAbbas ibn ʿAbd al-Muṭṭalib, an uncle of the Islamic prophet Muhammad from the Banu Hashim. Although Abu Muslim, who directed the uprising in Khurāsān, played a decisive organizational and military role, his precise ethnic origins remain debated in the sources.

The revolutionary forces (ahl Khurāsān) were heavily composed of long-settled Arab tribal groups in Khurāsān (Khorasani Arabs), many of whom were affiliated with South Arabian (Yamani) confederations that had been established there since the early Islamic conquests. They formed the backbone and majority of the forces and brought the Abbasids to power. Non-Arab Muslim converts (the mawālī), including Iranian Muslims, and local supporters participated too in the movement.

== Background ==
By the 740s CE, the Umayyad Caliphate found itself in critical condition. A succession crisis in 744 led to the Third Fitna, which raged across the Middle East for three years. The very next year, al-Dahhak ibn Qays al-Shaybani initiated a Kharijite rebellion that would continue until 746. Concurrent with this, a rebellion broke out in reaction to Marwan II's decision to move the capital from Damascus to Harran, resulting in the destruction of Homs – also in 746. It was not until 747 that Marwan II was able to pacify the provinces; the Abbasid revolution began within the course of months.

Nasr ibn Sayyar was appointed governor of Khorasan by Hisham ibn Abd al-Malik in 738. He held on to his post throughout the war of succession, being confirmed as governor by Marwan II in the aftermath.

Khorasan's expansive size and low population density meant that the Arab denizens – both military and civilian – lived largely outside of the garrisons built during the spread of Islam into Persia (then under the influence of Zoroastrianism). This was in contrast to the rest of the Umayyad provinces, where Arabs tended to seclude themselves in fortresses to avoid interacting with the locals. Arab settlers in Khorasan left their traditional lifestyle and settled among the native Iranian peoples. While intermarriage with non-Arabs elsewhere in the Empire was discouraged or even banned, it slowly became a habit within eastern Khorasan; and the Arabs began adopting Persian dress and as the two languages influenced one another, the ethnic barriers gradually eroded.

== Causes ==
Support for the Abbasid revolution came from people of diverse backgrounds, with almost all levels of society supporting armed opposition to Umayyad rule. This was especially pronounced among Muslims of non-Arab descent, though even Arab Muslims resented Umayyad rule and centralized authority over their nomadic lifestyles. Both Sunnis and Shi'as supported efforts to overthrow the Umayyads, as did non-Muslim subjects of the empire who resented religious discrimination.

=== Discontent among Shi'as ===
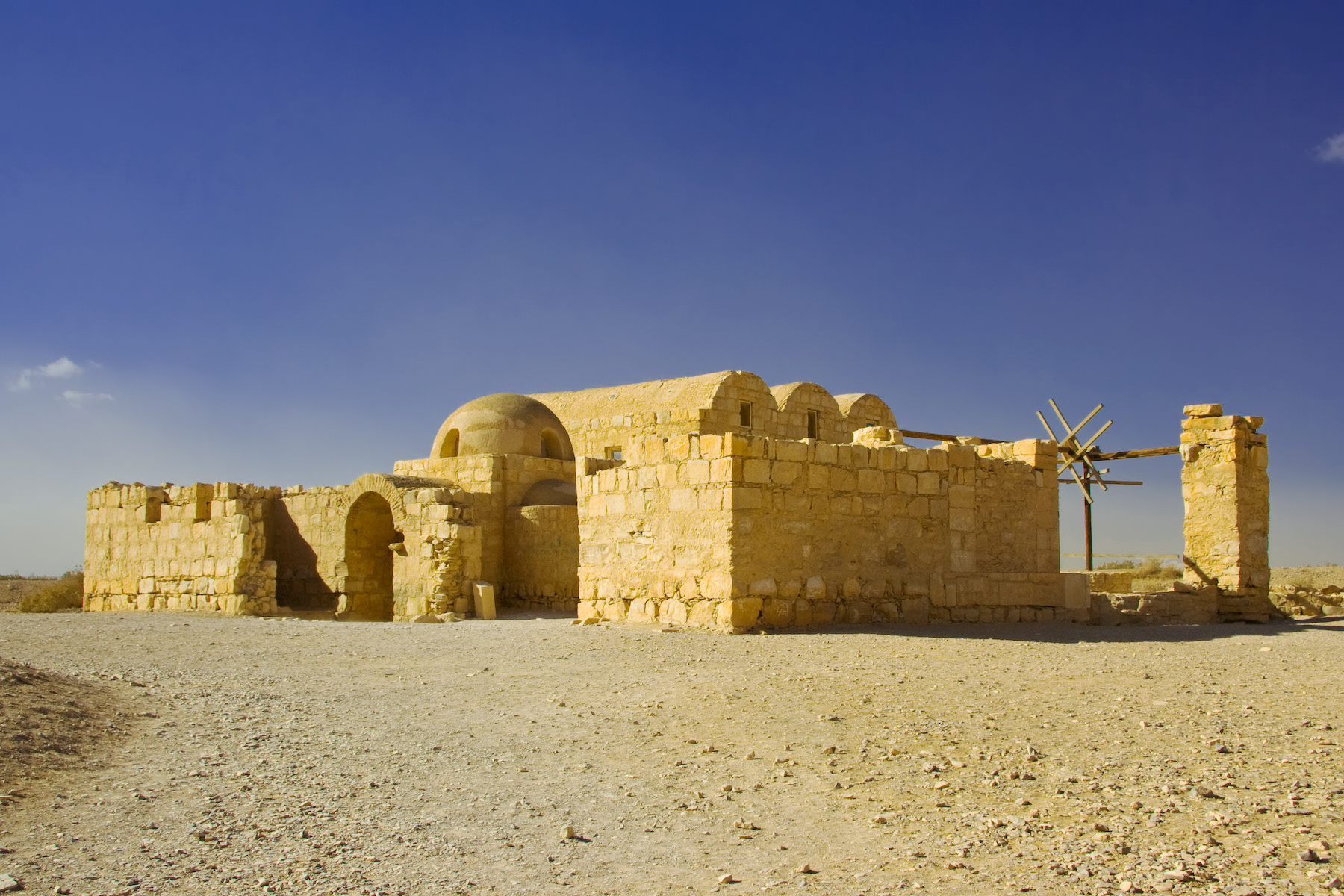
Remnants of Qasr Amra, a desert palace where Umayyad princes were notorious for indulgence and extravagance

The Battle of Karbala, where Husayn ibn Ali, the grandson of Muhammad, alongside his kin and companions, were massacred by Umayyad forces in 680 CE, became a rallying cry of opposition against the Umayyads. The Abbasids used the memory of Karbala extensively to gain popular support against the Umayyads, which further rallied Shi'ite support. In the decades preceding the Abbasid revolution, several Shi'ite and Alid uprisings had taken place against the Umayyads. To an extent, rebellion against the Umayyads bore an early association with Shi'ite ideas. This included the Tawwabin uprising led by Sulayman ibn Surad in 684–685 and Mukhtar al-Thaqafi's uprising in 685–687. Later on, the revolts of Zayd ibn Ali in 740 and the uprising of Abd Allah ibn Mu'awiya in 747–748, who even established temporary rule over much of Iran, paved the way for the Abbasid revolution.

The Hashimiyya movement (a sub-sect of the Shi'ite Kaysanites) was largely responsible for starting the final efforts against the Umayyad dynasty, initially with the goal of replacing the Umayyads with an Alid ruling family. Initially, the Abbasid family kept quiet about their identity, simply stating that they wanted a ruler from the descendant of Muhammad upon whose choice as caliph the Muslim community would agree to. Many Shi'ites naturally assumed that this meant an Alid ruler, a belief which the Abbasids tacitly encouraged to gain Shi'ite support. The Abbasids claimed that Abu Hashim, the grandson of Ali through his son Muhammad ibn al-Hanafiyya, had formally transferred the Imamate to Muhammad ibn Ali ibn Abdallah in 717, and thus the Imamate was transferred to the house of al-Abbas.

Although the anecdote is considered a fabrication, at the time it allowed the Abbasids to rally the supporters of the failed revolt of Mukhtar al-Thaqafi, who had represented themselves as the supporters of Muhammad ibn al-Hanafiyya. By the time the revolution was in full swing, most Kaysanite Shia had either transferred their allegiance to the Abbasid dynasty (in the case of the Hashimiyya), or differed to other branches of Shi'ism, and so the Kaysanites ceased to exist.

=== Discontent among non-Arab Muslims ===
The Umayyad state is remembered as an Arab-centric state, being run by and for the benefit of those who were ethnically Arab though Muslim in creed. The non-Arab Muslims resented their marginal social position and were easily drawn into Abbasid opposition to Umayyad rule. Arabs dominated the bureaucracy and military, and were housed in fortresses separate from the local population outside of Arabia. Even after converting to Islam, non-Arabs or Mawali could not live in these garrison cities. The non-Arabs were not allowed to work for the government nor could they hold officer positions in the Umayyad military and they still had to pay the jizya tax for non-Muslims. Non-Muslims under Umayyad rule were subject to these same injunctions. Racial intermarriage between Arabs and non-Arabs was rare. When it did occur, it was only allowed between an Arab man and a non-Arab woman while non-Arab men were generally not free to marry Arab women.

Conversion to Islam occurred gradually. If a non-Arab wished to convert to Islam, they not only had to give up their own names but also had to remain a second-class citizen. The non-Arab would be "adopted" by an Arab tribe, though they would not actually adopt the tribe's name as that would risk pollution of perceived Arab racial purity. Rather, the non-Arab would take the last name of "freedman of al-(tribe's name)", even if they were not a slave prior to conversion. This essentially meant they were subservient to the tribe who sponsored their conversion.

Although converts to Islam made up roughly 10% of the native population – most of the people living under Umayyad rule were not Muslim – this percent was significant due to the very small number of Arabs. Gradually, the non-Arab Muslims outnumbered the Arab Muslims, causing alarm among the Arab nobility. Socially, this posed a problem as the Umayyads viewed Islam as the property of the aristocratic Arab families. There was a rather large financial problem posed to the Umayyad system as well. If the new converts to Islam from non-Arab peoples stopped paying the jizya tax stipulated by the Qur'an for non-Muslims, the empire would go bankrupt. This lack of civil and political rights eventually led the non-Arab Muslims to support the Abbasids, despite the latter also being Arab.

Even as the Arab governors adopted the more sophisticated Iranian methods of governmental administration, non-Arabs were still prevented from holding such positions. Non-Arabs were not even allowed to wear Arabian style clothing, so strong were the feelings of Arab racial superiority cultivated by the Umayyads. Much of the discontent this caused led to the Shu'ubiyya movement, an assertion of non-Arab racial and cultural equality with Arabs. The movement gained support among Egyptians, Arameans and Berbers, though this movement was most pronounced among Iranian peoples. The early Muslim conquest of Persia was coupled with an anti-Iranian Arabization policy which led to much discontent.

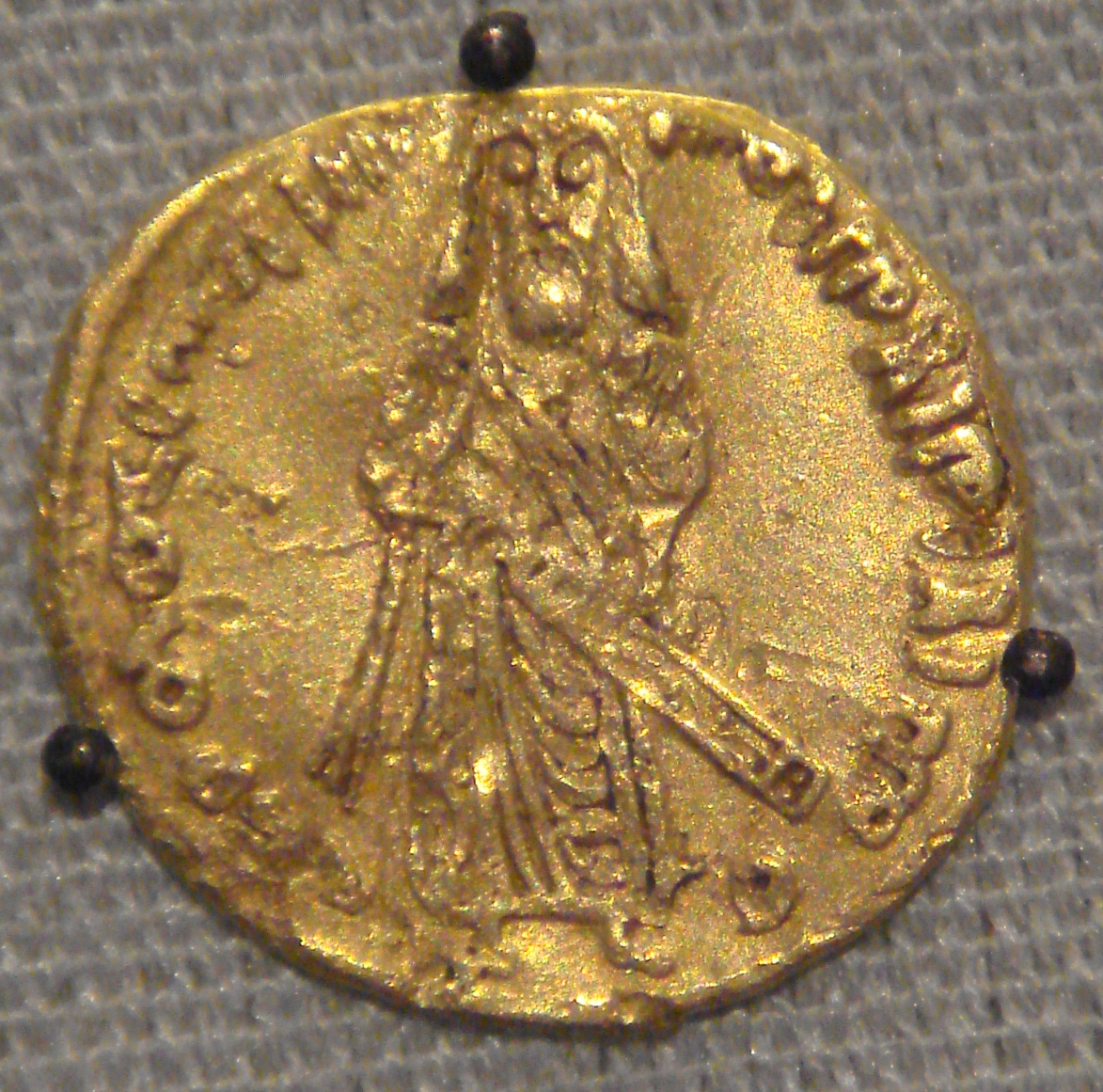
Coinage depicting Umayyad Caliph Abd al-Malik ibn Marwan

The Umayyad governor of Iraq and the east, Al-Hajjaj ibn Yusuf, forced all the mawali who had left for cities, in order to avoid paying the kharaj tax, to return to their lands. He was upset at the usage of Persian as the court language in the eastern Islamic empire, and ordered it to be changed to Arabic. Up until the reign of Caliph Abd al-Malik ibn Marwan, the Roman coinage was used throughout of Syria, Egypt and Arabia while Sassanian coins were through Iraq and Iraq, the caliph introduced the first official Islamic coinage in Arabic. He also transformed the government accounts of Damascus from Greek to Arabic and the government accounts of Kufa were transformed from Persian to Arabic.

=== Discontent among non-Muslims ===
Support for the Abbasid revolution was an early example of people of different faiths aligning with a common cause. This was due in large part to policies of the Umayyads which were regarded as particularly oppressive to anyone following a faith other than Islam. In 741, the Umayyads decreed that non-Muslims could not serve in government posts. The Abbasids were aware of this discontent, and made efforts to balance both its Muslim character as well as its partially non-Muslim constituency.

The non-Muslim aristocracy around Merv supported the Abbasids, and thus retained their status as a privileged governing class regardless of religious belief.

== Historical events ==
=== Buildup ===
Beginning around 719, Hashimiyya missions began to seek adherents in Khurasan. Their campaign was framed as one of proselytism. They sought support for "a member of the House of Muhammad who shall be pleasing to everyone", without making explicit mention of the Abbasids. These missions met with success both among Arabs and non-Arabs, although the latter may have played a particularly important role in the growth of the movement. A number of Shi'ite rebellions – by Kaysanites, Hashimiyya and mainstream Shi'ites – took place in the final years of Umayyad rule, just around the same time that tempers were flaring among the Syrian contingents of the Umayyad army regarding alliances and wrongdoings during the Third Fitna.

At this time Kufa was the center for the opposition to Umayyad rule, particularly Ali's supporters and Shias. In 741–42 Abu Muslim made his first contact with Abbasid agents there, and eventually he was introduced to the head of Abbasids, Ibrahim al-Imam, in Mecca. Around 746, Abu Muslim assumed leadership of the Hashimiyya in Khurasan. Unlike the Alid revolts which were open and straightforward about their demands, the Abbasids along with the Hashimite allies slowly built up an underground resistance movement to Umayyad rule. Secret networks were used to build a power base of support in the eastern Muslim lands to ensure the revolution's success. This buildup not only took place right on the heels of the Zaydi Revolt in Iraq, but also concurrently with the Berber Revolt in Iberia and Maghreb, the Ibadi revolt in Yemen and Hejaz, and the Third Fitna in the Levant, with the revolt of al-Harith ibn Surayj in Khorasan and Central Asia occurring concurrently with the revolution itself. The Abbasids spent their preparation time watching as the Umayyad Empire was besieged from within itself in all four cardinal directions, and G. R. Hawting has asserted that even if the Umayyad rulers had been aware of the Abbasids' preparations, it would not have been possible to mobilize against them.

==== Revolt of Ibn Surayj ====
In 746, Ibn Surayj began his revolt at Merv without success at first, even losing his secretary Jahm bin Safwan. After joining forces with other rebel factions, Ibn Surayj drove the Umayyad governor Nasr ibn Sayyar and his forces to Nishapur. The two factions crossed each other shortly thereafter, with Ibn Surayj's faction being crushed. Western Khorasan was controlled by Abd Allah ibn Mu'awiya at the time, cutting Ibn Sayyar in the east off from Marwan II. In the summer of 747, Ibn Sayyar sued for peace, which was accepted by the remaining rebels. The rebel leader was assassinated by a son of Ibn Surayj in a revenge attack while at the same time, another Shi'ite revolt had begun in the villages. The son of the remaining rebels signed the peace accord and Ibn Sayyar returned to his post in Merv in August of 747 – just after Abu Muslim initiated a revolt of his own.

=== Persian phase ===
On 9 June 747 (Ramadan 25, 129AH), Abu Muslim successfully initiated an open revolt against Umayyad rule, which was carried out under the sign of the Black Standard. Abu Muslim rose in the name of an Imam, still unnamed at the time but spoken of as al-Rida, rallying support from Khorasanians and Shi'ites. Close to 10,000 soldiers were under Abu Muslim's command when the hostilities officially began in Merv. On 14 February 748, he established control of Merv, expelling Nasr ibn Sayyar less than a year after the latter had put down Ibn Surayj's revolt, and dispatched an army westwards.

Newly commissioned Abbasid officer Qahtaba ibn Shabib al-Ta'i, along with his sons Al-Hasan ibn Qahtaba and Humayd ibn Qahtaba, pursued Ibn Sayyar to Nishapur and then pushed him further west to Qumis, in western Persia. That August, al-Ta'i defeated an Umayyad force of 10,000 at Gorgan, southeast of the Caspian Sea. Ibn Sayyar regrouped with reinforcements from the Caliph at Rey near Tehran, only for that city to fall as well; once again, Ibn Sayyar fled west and died on 9 December 748 while trying to reach Hamadan in south Western Persia. Al-Ta'i rolled west through Khorasan, defeating a 50,000 strong Umayyad force at Isfahan in Central Persia in March 749.

At Nahavand in southwestern Iran, the Umayyads attempted to make their last stand in Persia. Umayyad forces fleeing Hamadan and the remainder of Ibn Sayyar's men joined with those already garrisoned. Qahtaba defeated an Umayyad relief contingent from Syria while his son al-Hasan laid siege to Nahavand for more than two months. The Umayyad military units from Syria within the garrison cut a deal with the Abbasids, saving their own lives by selling out the Umayyad units from Khorasan who were all put to death. After almost ninety years, Umayyad rule in Khorasan had finally come to an end.

At the same time that al-Ta'i took Nishapur, located in northeastern Khorasan, Abu Muslim was strengthening the Abbasid grip on the Muslim northeast. Abbasid governors were appointed over Transoxiana and Bactria (overlapping contemporary Turkmenistan, Tajikistan, Uzbekistan, Kyrgyzstan and Kazakhstan), while the rebels who had signed a peace accord with Nasr ibn Sayyar were also offered a peace deal by Abu Muslim only to be double crossed and wiped out. With the pacification of any rebel elements in the east and the surrender of Nahavand in the west, the Abbasids were the undisputed rulers of Khorasan.

=== Mesopotamia phase ===
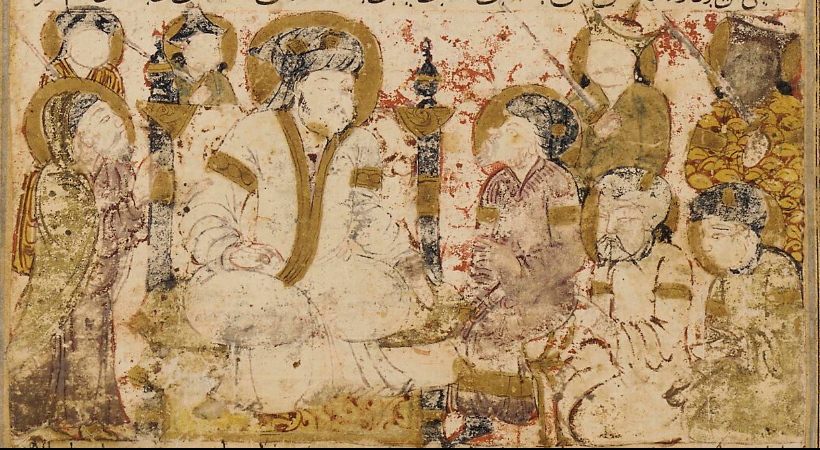
Folio from the records of Balami depicting As-Saffah as he receives pledges of allegiance in Kufa

The Abbasids wasted no time in continuing from Persia into Mesopotamia. In August 749, Umayyad commander Yazid ibn Umar al-Fazari attempted to meet the forces of al-Ta'i before they could reach Kufa. Not to be outdone, the Abbasids launched a nighttime raid on al-Fazari's forces before they had a chance to prepare. During the raid, al-Ta'i himself was killed in battle. Despite this loss, al-Fazari was routed and fled with his forces to Wasit. The Siege of Wasit took place from that August until July 750. Although a respected military commander had been killed, a large portion of the Umayyad forces were essentially trapped inside Wasit and could be left in their virtual prison.

Ibrahim al-Imam, the leader of the Abbasid movement, was executed by Marwan II as the Abbasid armies were entering Iraq. Concurrently with the siege in 749, the Abbasids crossed the Euphrates and took Kufa. Muhammad ibn Khalid al-Qasri, son of a disgraced Umayyad official who had been tortured to death a few years earlier, began a pro-Abbasid riot from the city's citadel. On 2 September 749, al-Hasan ibn Qahtaba entered the city. Some confusion followed when Abu Salama, an Abbasid officer, pushed for an Alid leader. Abu Muslim's confidante Abu Jahm reported what was happening, and the Abbasids acted preemptively. On Friday, 28 November 749, before the siege of Wasit had even finished, al-Saffah, the great-grandson of Muhammad's uncle, al-Abbas, was recognized as the new caliph in the mosque at Kufa. Abu Salama, who witnessed twelve military commanders from the revolution pledging allegiance, was embarrassed into following suit.

Just as quickly as Qahtaba's forces marched from Khorosan to Kufa, so did the forces of Abd Allah ibn Ali and Abu Awn Abd al-Malik ibn Yazid march on Mosul. At this point Marwan II mobilized his troops from Harran and advanced toward Mesopotamia. On 16 January 750 the two forces met on the left bank of a tributary of the Tigris in the Battle of the Zab, and nine days later Marwan II was defeated and his army was completely destroyed. The battle is regarded as what finally sealed the fate of the Umayyads. All Marwan II could do was flee through Syria and into Egypt, with each Umayyad town surrendering to the Abbasids as they swept through in pursuit.

Damascus fell to the Abbasids in April, and in August Marwan II and his family were tracked down by a small force led by Abu Awn and Salih ibn Ali (the brother of Abdallah ibn Ali) and killed in Egypt. Al-Fazari, the Umayyad commander at Wasit, held out even after the defeat of Marwan II in January. The Abbasids promised him amnesty in July, but immediately after he exited the fortress they executed him instead. After almost exactly three years of rebellion, the Umayyad state came to an end.

=== Massacre of Umayyad remnants ===
The victors desecrated the tombs of the Umayyads in Syria, sparing only that of Umar ibn Abd al-Aziz, and most of the remaining members of the Umayyad family were tracked down and killed. When Abbasids under Abd Allah ibn Ali declared amnesty for members of the Umayyad family, eighty gathered in Jaffa to receive pardons and all were massacred. It was said that the massacre took place during a gathering banquet, with Abd Allah reportedly continuing to dine throughout the event. ʿAbd Allah ibn Ali presented the mass killings of Umayyads as retaliation for Husayn's death at Karbala.

== Tactics ==
=== Ethnic equality ===
Militarily, the unit organization of the Abbasids was designed with the goal of ethnic and racial equality among supporters. When Abu Muslim recruited mixed Arab and Turks and Iranian officers along the Silk Road, he registered them based not on their tribal or ethno-national affiliations but on their current places of residence. This greatly diminished tribal and ethnic solidarity and replaced both concepts with a sense of shared interests among individuals.

=== Propaganda ===
The Abbasid revolution provides an early medieval example of the effectiveness of propaganda. The Black Standard unfurled at the start of the revolution's open phase carried messianic overtones due to past failed rebellions by members of Muhammad's family, with marked eschatological and millennial slants. The Abbasids – their leaders descended from Muhammad's uncle Abbas ibn Abd al-Muttalib – held vivid historical reenactments of the murder of Muhammad's grandson Husayn ibn Ali by the army of the second Umayyad ruler Yazid I, followed by promises of retribution. Focus was carefully placed on the legacy of Muhammad's family while details of how the Abbasids actually intended to rule were not mentioned. While the Umayyads had primarily spent their energy on wiping out the Alid line of Muhammad's family, the Abbasids carefully revised Muslim chronicles to put a heavier emphasis on the relationship between Muhammad and his uncle.

The Abbasids spent more than a year preparing their propaganda drive against the Umayyads. There were a total of seventy propagandists throughout the province of Khorasan, operating under twelve central officials.

=== Secrecy ===
The Abbasid revolution was distinguished by a number of tactics which were absent in the other, unsuccessful anti-Umayyad rebellions at the time. Chief among them was secrecy. While the Shi'ite and other rebellions at the time were all led by publicly known leaders making clear and well-defined demands, the Abbasids hid not only their identities but also their preparation and mere existence. As-Saffah would go on to become the first Abbasid caliph, but he did not come forward to receive the pledge of allegiance from the people until after the Umayyad caliph and a large number of his princes were already killed.

Abu Muslim al-Khorasani, who was the primary Abbasid military commander, was especially mysterious; even his name, which literally means "father of a Muslim from Khorasan" gave no meaningful information about him personally. Even today, although scholars are sure he was one real, consistent individual, there is broad agreement that all concrete suggestions of his actual identity are doubtful. Abu Muslim himself discouraged inquiries about his origins, emphasizing that his religion and place of residence were all that mattered.

Whoever he was, Abu Muslim built a secret network of pro-Abbasid sentiment based among the mixed Arab and Iranian military officers along the Silk Road garrison cities. Through this networking, Abu Muslim ensured armed support for the Abbasids from a multi-ethnic force years before the revolution even came out in the open. These networks proved essential, as the officers garrisoned along the Silk Road had spent years fighting the ferocious Turkic tribes of Central Asia and were experienced and respected tacticians and warriors.

== Aftermath ==
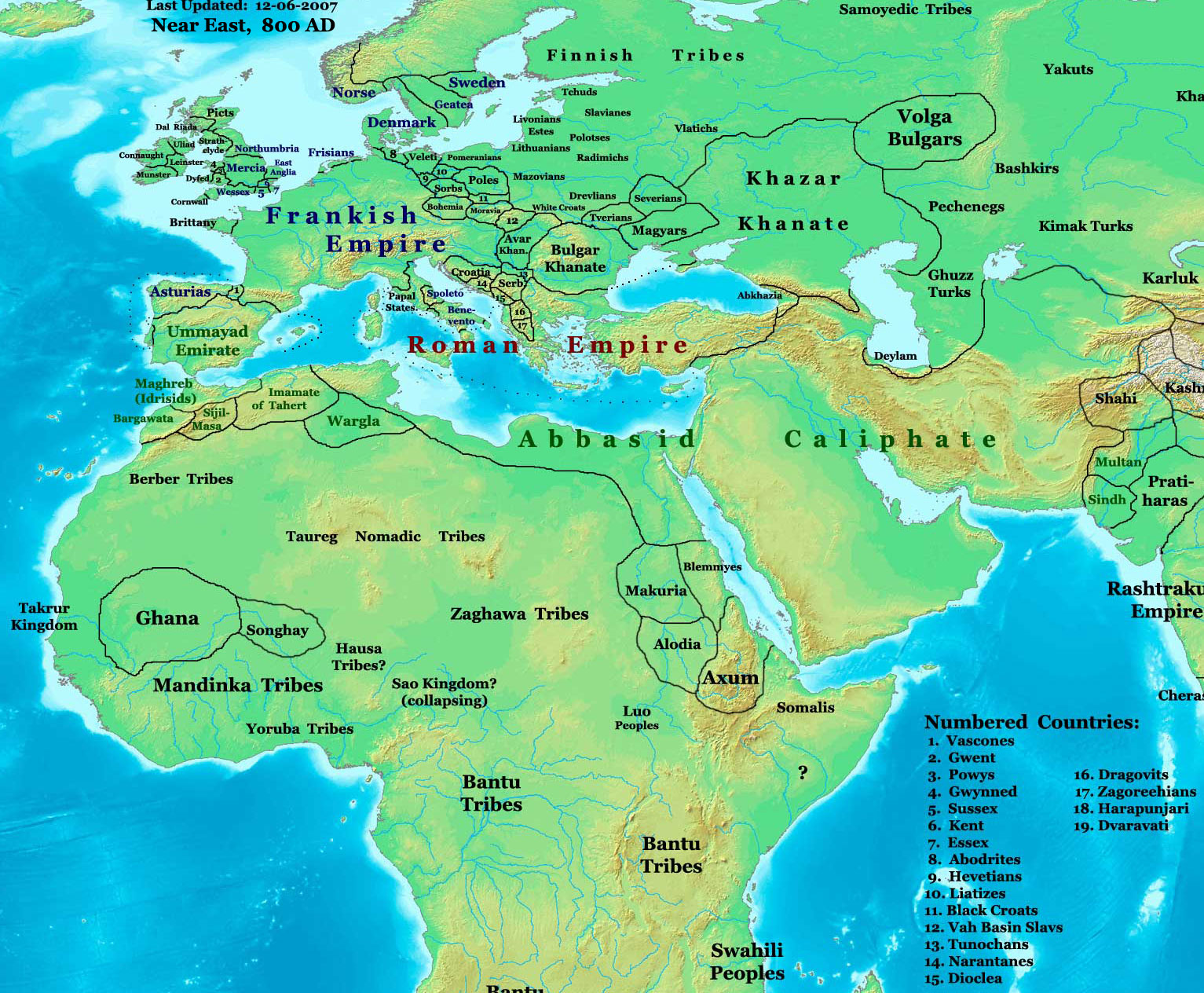
National borders in the region by 800AD

In the immediate aftermath, the Abbasids moved to consolidate their power against former allies now seen as rivals. Five years after the revolution succeeded, Abu Muslim was accused of heresy and treason by the second Abbasid caliph Abu Ja'far al-Mansur. Abu Muslim was executed at the palace in 755 despite his reminding al-Mansur that it was he who got the Abbasids into power, and his travel companions were bribed into silence. Displeasure over the caliph's brutality as well as admiration for Abu Muslim led to rebellions against the Abbasids throughout Khorasan and Kurdistan.

Although Shi'ites were key to the revolution's success, Abbasid attempts to claim orthodoxy in light of Umayyad material excess led to continued persecution of Shi'ites. Al-Mansur's son, al-Mahdi (775–785), formally declared that al-Abbas himself was the Imam, thus abandoning the claim that Imamah was transferred through the Alids. To further underline his credibility, he took the title al-Mahdi. On the other hand, non-Muslims regained the government posts they had lost under the Umayyads. Jews, Nestorian Christians, Zoroastrians and even Buddhists were re-integrated into a more cosmopolitan empire centered around the new, ethnically and religiously diverse city of Baghdad.

The Abbasids were essentially puppets of secular rulers starting from 945, though their rule over Baghdad and its surroundings continued until 1258 when the Mongols sacked Baghdad, while their lineage as nominal caliphs lasted until 1517, when the Ottomans conquered Egypt (the seat of the Abbasid caliphate after 1258) and claimed the caliphate for themselves. The period of actual, direct rule by the Abbasids lasted almost exactly two-hundred years.

One grandson of Hisham ibn Abd al-Malik, Abd al-Rahman I, survived and established a kingdom in Al-Andalus after five years of travel westward. Over the course of thirty years, he ousted the ruling Fihrids and resisted Abbasid incursions to establish the Emirate of Córdoba. This is considered an extension of the Umayyads, who ruled in Cordoba from 756 until 1031.

== Legacy ==
The Abbasid revolution has been of great interest to both Western and Muslim historians. According to Saïd Amir Arjomand, analytical interpretations of the revolution are rare, with most discussions simply lining up behind either the Iranic or Arabic interpretation of events. Frequently, early European historians viewed the conflict solely as a non-Arab uprising against Arabs. Bernard Lewis points out that while the revolution has often been characterized as a Persian victory and Arab defeat, the caliph was still Arab, the language of administration was still Arabic and Arab nobility was not forced to give up its land holdings; rather, the Arabs were merely forced to share the fruits of the empire equally with other races.

Professor Hamilton Gibb and Professor Lewis were among the first Orientalists to recognize the active role of the Arabs in the Abbasid Revolution. Gibb did not study the Abbasid Revolution directly, but in other writings he highlighted the importance of the Yemeni Arabs in the uprising. He rejected the idea of a popular Persian movement supporting Abu Muslim al-Khorasani and emphasized the non-ethnic character of the revolution, noting that the cities of Khurasan did not seize the opportunity of the revolution to rise up en masse against the Umayyads. On the contrary, historical sources show the opposite. He also argued that the significance of the Abbasid change lay in integrating the privileged Arabs into the wider Muslim community. Professor Lewis notes the role of the Arabs in Khorasan in the revolution, especially in his article on the Abbasids in the Encyclopedia of Islam, but these notes were brief and cautious.

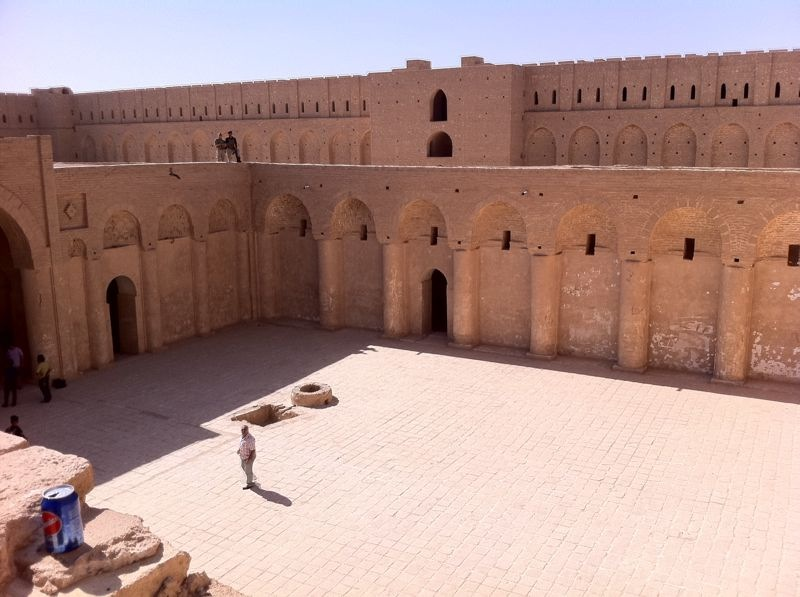
Al-Ukhaidir Fortress, an early example of Abbasid architecture

C. W. Previté-Orton argues that the reason for the decline of the Umayyads was the rapid expansion of Islam. During the Umayyad period, mass conversions brought Arabians, Arameans, Iranians, Berbers, Egyptians, and Assyrians to Islam. The new converts, on the basis of equality of all Muslims, transformed the political landscape. He also argues that the feud between the Arabs of Syria and Mesopotamia further weakened the empire.

The revolution led to the enfranchisement of non-Arab people who had converted to Islam, granting them social and spiritual equality with Arabs. With social restrictions removed, Islam changed from an Arab ethnic empire to a universal world religion. This led to a great cultural and scientific exchange known as the Islamic Golden Age, with most achievements taking place under the Abbasids. What was later known as Islamic civilization and culture was defined by the Abbasids, rather than the earlier Rashidun and Umayyad caliphates. New ideas in all areas of society were accepted regardless of their geographic origin, and the emergence of societal institutions that were Islamic rather than Arab began. Though a class of Muslim clergy was absent for the first century of Islam, it was with the Abbasid revolution and after that the Ulama appeared as a force in society, positioning themselves as the arbiters of justice and orthodoxy.

With the eastward movement of the capital from Damascus to Baghdad, the Abbasid Empire eventually took on a distinctly Persian character, as opposed to the Arab character of the Umayyads. Rulers became increasingly autocratic, at times claiming divine right in defense of their actions.

== Conclusion ==
An accurate and comprehensive history of the revolution has proven difficult to compile for a number of reasons. There are no contemporary accounts known to have survived, and most sources were written more than a century after the revolution. Because most historical sources were written under Abbasid rule, the description of the Umayyads must be taken with a grain of salt; such sources describe the Umayyads, at best, as merely placeholders between the Rashidun and Abbasid caliphates.

The historiography of the revolution is especially significant due to Abbasid dominance of most early Muslim historical narratives; it was during their rule that history was established in the Muslim world as an independent field separate from writing in general. The initial two-hundred year period when the Abbasids actually held de facto power over the Muslim world coincided with the first composition of Muslim history. Historiographical surveys often focus on the solidifying of Muslim thought and rites under the Abbasids, with the conflicts between separated classes of rulers and clerics giving rise to the empire's eventual separation of religion and politics.

== See also ==
- Muslim conquest of the Maghreb
- Battle of the Great Zab River

== Sources ==
- al-Asad, Mohammad (2000). "Historical Artistic Introduction". The Umayyads: The Rise of Islamic Art. Electa & Museum with No Frontiers. ISBN 9781874044352.
- Astren, Fred (2004). Karaite Judaism and Historical Understanding. University of South Carolina Press. pp. 33–4. ISBN 9781570035180.
- Bosworth, Clifford E.; van Donzel, Emeri; Lewis, Bernard; Pellat, Charles, eds. (1986). The Encyclopaedia of Islam. Vol. 5 (Khe-Mahi) (2nd ed.). Brill. ISBN 9789004078192.
- Bosworth, Clifford E.; van Donzel, Emeri; Heinrichs, Wolfhart; Lecomte, Gérard, eds. (1997). The Encyclopaedia of Islam. Vol. 9 (San-Sze) (2nd ed.). Brill. ISBN 9789004104228.
- Daftary, Farhad (2004). Ismaili Literature: A Bibliography of Sources and Studies. I.B. Tauris and the Institute of Ismaili Studies. ISBN 9781850434399.
- Esposito, John L., ed. (1999). The Oxford History of Islam. Oxford University Press. ISBN 9780195107999.
- Fattah, Hala Mundhir; Caso, Frank (2009). A Brief History of Iraq. Infobase. ISBN 9780816057672.
- Frye, Richard N., ed. (1999) [1975]. The Cambridge History of Iran. Vol. 4 - The Period from the Arab Invasion to the Saljuqs. Cambridge University Press. ISBN 9780521200936.
- Gordon, Matthew S. (2005). The Rise of Islam. Greenwood Guides to Historic Events of the Medieval World. Hackett Publishing Company. ISBN 9780872209312.
- Hawting, Gerald R. (2000) [1986]. The First Dynasty of Islam: The Umayyad Caliphate AD 661–750. Routledge. ISBN 9780415240734.
- Kennedy, Hugh N. (1981). The Early Abbasid Caliphate. A Political History. Croom Helm. ISBN 9780389200185.
- Newman, Andrew J. (2013). Twelver Shiism: Unity and Diversity in the Life of Islam, 632 to 1722. Edinburgh University Press. ISBN 9780748633319.
- Omar, Farouk (1988). الثورة العباسية [The Abbasid Revolution] (in Arabic). Dar Afaq Arabiya.
- Spuler, Bertold (1968) [1960]. The Muslim World a Historical Survey. Vol. 1 - The Age of the Caliphs. Translated by F.R.C. Bagley (2nd, reprint ed.). E.J. Brill.
- Zaman, Muhammad Qasim (1997). Religion and Politics Under the Early ʻAbbāsids: The Emergence of the Proto-Sunnī Elite. Brill. ISBN 9789004106789.
- Zetterstéen, Karl V. (1987) [1927]. "ʿAbd Allāh b. ʿAlī". In Houtsma, Martijn T.; Arnold, Thomas W.; Basset, René; Hartmann, R. (eds.). E.J. Brill's first encyclopaedia of Islam, 1913–1936. Vol. 1: A–Bābā Beg. Brill. ISBN 9789004097872.
