= Abd al-Rahim ibn Ja'far ibn Sulayman al-Hashimi =

Abbasid Governor of Yemen (835-839)

Abd al-Rahim ibn Ja'far ibn Sulayman al-Hashimi عبد الرحيم بن جعفر بن سليمان الهاشمي

Abbasid Governor of Yemen
- In office 835–839
- Monarch: Al-Mu'tasim
- Preceded by: Abbad ibn al-Ghamr al-Shihabi
- Succeeded by: Mansur ibn Abd al-Rahman al-Tanukhi

Personal details
- Died: c. 844; Abbasid Caliphate
- Relations: Abbasid dynasty
- Parent: Ja'far ibn Sulayman ibn Ali al-Hashimi
- Relatives: Muhammad (uncle); Abbasa (aunt); Ishaq (uncle); Ali (uncle)

Abd al-Rahim ibn Ja'far ibn Sulayman al-Hashimi (Arabic: عبد الرحيم بن جعفر بن سليمان الهاشمي) (died ca. 844) was a ninth century Abbasid personage and governor of the Yemen.

== Career ==
The son of Ja'far ibn Sulayman ibn Ali al-Hashimi, Abd al-Rahim was a minor member of the Abbasid dynasty, being a second nephew of the caliphs al-Saffah (r. 750–754) and al-Mansur (r. 754–775). He was appointed governor of the Yemen by the caliph al-Mu'tasim (r. 833–842), and he arrived in Sana'a near the beginning of 836. During his governorship he was forced to deal with the Yu'firid rebel Yu'fir ibn Abd al-Rahman al-Hiwali, who imprisoned the previous governor Abbad ibn al-Ghamr al-Shihabi and his son and defeated an expedition sent against him. Abd al-Rahim remained governor until 839, when he was dismissed in favor of Ja'far ibn Dinar al-Khayyat.

Abd al-Rahim was later arrested during the caliphate of al-Wathiq (r. 842–847) and forced to surrender his wealth. He died in prison in ca. 844.

== Notes ==
Political offices
| Preceded by Abbad ibn al-Ghamr al-Shihabi | Abbasid governor of the Yemen; 835–839 | Succeeded by Mansur ibn Abd al-Rahman al-Tanukhi |
