= Lakhani (surname) =

Lakhani is a surname, which means "descendant of Lakh", derived from the Sanskrit laksmana, meaning "one who has auspicious marks". The name originates from Gujarat, India and Sindh, Pakistan. The surname may refer to:

- Ali Lakhani (born 1955), British writer
- Hemant Lakhani (1935–2013), British businessman
- Iqbal Ali Lakhani, Pakistani industrialist
- Isha Lakhani (born 1985), Indian tennis player
- Ishtar Lakhani (born 1985), South African activist
- Karim R. Lakhani (born 1970), American business theorist
- Mayur Lakhani (born 1960), British doctor
- Murtaza Lakhani (born 1962), Pakistani businessman
- Sultan Ali Lakhani (born 1948), Pakistani businessman
- Samir Lakhani Sydney, Australian Migration Consultant
