= Murtaza =

- Pronunciation: Persian: [mor'tezɒː] Arabic: [mur'tadˤaː]
- Gender: Male
- Language: Persian, Arabic

Origin
- Meaning: 'Attainer of the pleasure of God, The Chosen One'

Other names
- Alternative spelling: Mortaza, Murtazo (Tajik), Murtadha

Murtaza (Afghan Persian: مُرتَضیٰ Murtazâ) or Morteza (Iranian Persian: مُرتِضیٰ Mortezâ) is a Persian male given name, ultimately derived from the Arabic Murtada (مُرْتَضَى Murtaḍā). It means "the favored one", "the chosen one", "the approved one", or "the one who is pleasing". Pronunciation varies with accent, from native Arabic speakers to speakers of European and Asian languages.

== Honorific/regnal name ==
- Ali (601–661), the cousin and son-in-law of the prophet Muhammad, the first Shia Imam, and the fourth Rashidun Caliph
- Al-Husayn ibn Ali al-Abid, descendant of Ali, rose in revolt against the Abbasid Caliphate and assumed the name al-Murtadha as his regnal title.
- Al-Murtada Muhammad (died 922), second Zaydi Imam of Yemen
- Abu Hafs Umar al-Murtada (d. 1266), thirteenth Almohad caliph
- Sharif al-Murtaza (965–1044), Shi'a scholar
- Murtada al-Zabidi (1732–1790), Sufi scholar

== First name ==
- Morteza Agha-Tehrani (born 1957), Iranian shia cleric and politician
- Morteza Alviri (born 1948), Iranian politician, Mayor of Tehran 1999–2002
- Morteza Ansari (1781–1864), Shia jurist
- Morteza Asadi (born 1979), Iranian football defender
- Morteza Avini (1947–1993), Iranian photographer of the Iran-Iraq war
- Morteza Aziz-Mohammadi (born 1985), Iranian footballer
- Morteza Bakhtiari (born 1952), Iranian politician
- Morteza Barjesteh (born 1951), Iranian pop singer
- Murtaza Bhutto (1954–1996), Pakistani Member of the Sindh Provincial Assembly and left-wing politician
- Morteza Ebrahimi (born 1982), Iranian footballer
- Morteza Gholi Khan Hedayat (1856–1911), Iranian politician and first chairman of the Iranian parliament
- Morteza Hannaneh (1923–1989), Persian (Iranian) composer and horn player
- Morteza Hosseini Fayaz (1928–2014), Iraqi Twelver Shi'a Marja
- Morteza Hosseini Shirazi (born 1964), religious authority
- Morteza Izadi Zardalou (born 1981), Iranian footballer
- Morteza Kashi (born 1981), Iranian football footballer
- Murtaza Ahmed Khan, Indian politician
- Morteza Kermani-Moghaddam (born 1965), former Iranian football player
- Murtaza Lakhani (born 1962), Pakistani businessman
- Morteza Mahjoub (born 1980), Iranian chess grandmaster
- Morteza Moghtadai (born 1936), Iranian Shia scholar
- Morteza Mohammadkhan (1947–2022), the Minister of Economic Affairs and Finance of Iran 1993–1997
- Morteza Mohasses (born 1952), prominent Iranian football coach and analyst
- Morteza Momayez (1935–2005), Iranian graphic designer
- Morteza Motahhari (1920–1979), Iranian scholar, cleric, university lecturer, and politician
- Morteza Pashaei (1984–2014), Iranian pop singer and composer
- Morteza Pouraliganji (born 1992), Iranian footballer
- Morteza Poursamadi (1952–2023), Iranian cinematographer
- Murtaza Rakhimov (1934–2023), first president of Bashkortostan (1993–2010)
- Murtaza Razvi (1964–2012), Pakistani journalist
- Morteza Sadouqi Mazandarani (born 1946), Iranian Twelver Shi'a Marja
- Morteza Sepahvand (born 1979), Iranian amateur boxer
- Morteza Yazdanpanah (1888–1970), Iranian an army officer
- Morteza Zarringol, Iranian Kurdish politician
- Morteza-Qoli Bayat (1890–1958), Prime Minister of Iran

== Other similar names ==
- Murtala Muhammed (1938–1976), Nigerian Army general who was 4th Head of State of Nigeria.

== Surname ==
- Ali Murtaza, Indian cricketer
- Mashrafe Mortaza, Bangladeshi Cricketer
- Muzammil Murtaza, Pakistani Hazara Tennis Player

== See also ==
- Al-Mujtaba
