= Rayta bint al-Saffah =

8th-century Arab princess and First wife of Abbasid caliph Al-Mahdi

Rayta bint al-Saffah ريطة بنت السفاح
- Zawjat al-khalifa

Consort of the Abbasid caliph
- Tenure: 775 – 780s
- Born: c. 751/753; Kufa or Anbar, Abbasid Caliphate
- Died: 780s Baghdad, Abbasid Caliphate
- Burial: Baghdad
- Spouse: al-Mahdi (m. 761)
- Children: Ubaydallah ibn Muhammad al-Mahdi; Ali ibn Muhammad al-Mahdi
Names
- Rayta bint Abdallah al-Saffah ibn Muhammad
- Dynasty: Abbasid
- Father: Al-Saffah
- Mother: Umm Salama bint Ya'qub al-Makhzumi
- Religion: Islam

Rayṭa bint al-Saffāḥ (Arabic: ريطة بنت السفاح) was an Abbasid princess, daughter of first Abbasid caliph al-Saffah (r. 750–754), niece of second Abbasid caliph al-Mansur (r. 754–775) and the first wife of third Abbasid caliph al-Mahdi (r. 775–785).

== Biography ==
Rayta was the daughter of al-Saffah from his famous wife Umm Salama, who belonged to Makhzum clan of the Quraysh. Her father was the first Abbasid caliph, ruling from 750 to 754.

Rayta had an older maternal half-brother, Sa'id ibn Maslama, from her mother's first marriage to the Umayyad prince Maslama ibn Hisham. Sa'id was the grandson of the Umayyad caliph Hisham (r. 724–743). Sa'id became an oral transmitter of historical tradition in the early Abbasid period.

Rayta was very young, when her father died. Al-Saffah's brother, al-Mansur, took on the responsibility of establishing the Abbasid caliphate by holding on to power for nearly twenty-two years, from Dhu al-Hijjah 136 AH until Dhu al-Hijjah 158 AH (754–775 CE).

In 761, the Abbasid caliph al-Mahdi married Rayta as his first wife after his return from Khurasan. She gave birth to two sons, Ubaydallah and Ali.

Rayta remained the most influential wife of al-Mahdi until his marriage to al-Khayzuran bint Atta, an Arab woman of Yemenite origin born in the Hejaz. Al-Khayzuran convinced al-Mahdi to free and marry her, depriving Rayta of her privileges: she also convinced him to deprive his son by Rayta from the position of heir to the throne, and instead name her sons as heirs, despite the fact that the custom at that time did not allow for the sons of a slave to be named heirs. From that point on, she was the caliph's most influential wife.

== Family ==
Rayta was related to the Abbasid dynasty, the ruling house of the Caliphate both maternally and paternally. She was contemporary to several Abbasid caliphs, Abbasid princes and princesses.

No.	Family member	Relation
1	Al-Saffah	Father
2	Al-Mansur	Uncle and Father-in-law
3	Al-Mahdi	Husband
4	Al-Hadi	Step-son
5	Harun al-Rashid	Step-son
6	Ubaydallah ibn al-Mahdi	Elder son
7	Ali ibn al-Mahdi	Second son
8	Abbasa bint al-Mahdi	Step-daughter
9	Ulayya bint al-Mahdi	Step-daughter
10	Ibrahim ibn al-Mahdi	Step-son
11	Mansur ibn al-Mahdi	Step-son
12	Aliyah bint al-Mahdi	Step-daughter
13	Abdallah ibn al-Mahdi	Step-son
14	Isa ibn al-Mahdi	Step-son
15	Banuqa bint al-Mahdi	Step-daughter
16	Zubaidah bint Ja'far	Niece
17	Sa'id ibn Maslama	Maternal half-brother

== Sources ==
- Abbott, Nabia (1946). Two Queens of Baghdad: Mother and Wife of Hārūn Al Rashīd. University of Chicago Press. ISBN 978-0-86356-031-6.
- Bosworth, C. Edmund (1994). "Abū Ḥafṣ 'Umar al-Kirmānī and the Rise of the Barmakids". Bulletin of the School of Oriental and African Studies. 57 (2): 268–282. doi:10.1017/S0041977X0002485X. JSTOR 620573. S2CID 162613546.
- Sanders, P. (1990). The Meadows of Gold: The Abbasids by MAS‘UDI. Translated and edited by Lunde Paul and Stone Caroline, Kegan Paul International, London and New York, 1989 ISBN 0 7103 0246 0. Middle East Studies Association Bulletin, 24(1), 50–51. doi:10.1017/S0026318400022549
- Ibn Hazm, Abu Muhammad ibn 'Ali ibn Ahmad ibn Sa'id al-Andalusi (1982). Harun, 'Abd al-Salam Muhammad (ed.). Jamharat Ansab al-'Arab (in Arabic) (5th ed.). Cairo: Dar al-Ma'arif.
- Al-Khatib al-Baghdadi, Abu Bakr Ahmad ibn Ali (2011). Mustafa 'Abd al-Qadir 'Ata (ed.). Tarikh Baghdad/Madinat al-Salam (in Arabic). Vol. 10. Beirut: Dar al-Kutub al-'Ilmiyya.
