= Abbad ibn al-Ghamr al-Shihabi =

Abbasid governor of Yemen (833–835)

Abbasid Governor of Yemen
- In office 833–835
- Monarchs: al-Ma'mun, al-Mu'tasim
- Preceded by: Abdallah ibn Ubaydallah ibn al-Abbas al-Hashimi
- Succeeded by: Abd al-Rahim ibn Ja'far ibn Sulayman al-Hashimi

Abbad ibn al-Ghamr al-Shihabi (Arabic: عباد بن الغمر الشهابي; also known as Abbad ibn Umar) was a ninth-century governor of the Yemen for the Abbasid Caliphate.

A local Yemeni chief, Abbad was placed in charge of Sana'a by Muhammad ibn Abdallah ibn Muhriz in 824, and he held power there until the arrival of the governor Ishaq ibn al-Abbas ibn Muhammad al-Hashimi at the end of the year. Following the death of the caliph al-Ma'mun in 833, Abbad was again appointed over the Yemen by Abdallah ibn Ubaydallah ibn al-Abbas, and he was confirmed as governor by the new caliph al-Mu'tasim (r. 833–842). He remained in the governorship until the end of 835, when he was replaced by Abd al-Rahim ibn Ja'far ibn Sulayman al-Hashimi.

== Notes ==
Political offices
| Preceded by Abdallah ibn Ubaydallah ibn al-Abbas | Abbasid governor of the Yemen; 833–835 | Succeeded by Abd al-Rahim ibn Ja'far ibn Sulayman al-Hashimi |
