= Ali ibn Sulayman ibn Ali al-Hashimi =

Abbasid Provincial governor

Ali ibn Sulayman al-Hashimi علي بن سليمان الهاشمي

Governor of Yemen
- In office 777–778
- Monarch: al-Mahdi

Governor of Jazirah and Jund Qinnasrin
- In office c. 782 – c. 785
- Monarch: al-Mahdi

Governor of Egypt
- In office 786–787
- Monarchs: al-Hadi, Harun al-Rashid
- Preceded by: Al-Fadl ibn Salih
- Succeeded by: Musa ibn Isa

Personal details
- Died: 788 or 794
- Parent: Sulayman ibn Ali al-Hashimi (father)
- Relatives: Muhammad (brother); Ja'far (brother); Ishaq (brother); Zaynab (sister)

ʿAlī ibn Sulaymān al-Hāshimī (Arabic: علي بن سليمان الهاشمي) was an eighth-century Abbasid prince. He served as a governor of several provinces, including the Yemen, the Jazirah, and Egypt.

== Career ==
Ali was a son of Sulayman ibn Ali, an early Abbasid personage who had held the governorship of Basra for several years in the aftermath of the Abbasid Revolution. He himself was an extended relative of the ruling dynasty, being a first cousin of the first two Abbasid caliphs al-Saffah (r. 750–754) and al-Mansur (r. 754–775).

During the caliphate of al-Mahdi (r. 775–785) Ali served as governor of the Yemen (777–778) and once or twice as governor of the Jazirah and Qinnasrin (c. 782 – c. 785). While in the latter position, he reportedly relocated the markets of Raqqa to a more central location between that city and al-Rafiqah, and was instructed by al-Mahdi to rebuild the frontier town of Hadath after its sacking at the hands of the Byzantines. Following the collapse of a truce with the Byzantines in 785, he dispatched a cavalry force under Yazid ibn Badr ibn al-Battal on a raid which resulted in the acquisition of some spoils.

In 786 Ali was appointed as governor of Egypt by al-Hadi, and was re-confirmed in that office after the accession of Harun al-Rashid later that year. During his tenure in Fustat he embarked on a campaign of enjoining good and forbidding wrong, enacting measures such as prohibitions on musical instruments and wine. He also took action against recently built Christian churches, including the Church of Mary near Anba Shendua and those in the Citadel of Constantine, which he demolished despite an offer by the local Copts of fifty thousand dinars in exchange for sparing them. He remained in office until 787, when he was dismissed in favor of Musa ibn Isa ibn Musa al-Hashimi.

Various dates are given for his death, including 788 and 794.

== Notes ==
Preceded by Al-Fadl ibn Salih	Governor of Egypt; 786–787	Succeeded by Musa ibn Isa ibn Musa al-Hashimi
