= Mojtaba =

- Pronunciation: Persian: [modʒtʰæˈbɒː]
- Gender: Male

Origin
- Origin: Arabic
- Meaning: Chosen

Other names
- Alternative spelling: Mujteba, Moedjtaba, Mojtaba, Mücteba
- Related names: Morteza; Mostafa

Mojtaba or Mujtaba (Persian: مجتبی; Arabic: اَلْمُجْتَبَى, romanized: al-Mujtabā) is an Iranian male given name, originating from the Arabic for 'chosen'. It is an honorific title for the Islamic prophet Muhammad and his grandson Hasan. The name has an Islamic background and is considerably popular among the Shiites and Sufis as it is one of the honorary epithets of Hasan ibn Ali, the 2nd Imam of Shia Islam.

== People named Mojtaba ==
- Mojtaba Abedini (born 1984), Iranian Olympic fencer
- Mojtaba Haghdoust (born 1996), Iranian football player for Foolad F.C.
- Mojtaba Heidarpanah (born 1990), Iranian cartoonist and illustrator
- Seyed Mojtaba Hosseini (born 1954), Iranian Shia Cleric
- Mojtaba Jabbari (born 1983), retired Iranian football player for Esteghlal F.C.
- Mojtaba Khamenei (born 1969), Supreme Leader of Iran
- Mojtaba Minovi (1903–1977), Iranian historian, literary scholar and professor of Tehran University
- Mojtaba Mirtahmasb (born 1971), Iranian filmmaker and producer
- Mojtaba Mirzadeh (1946–2005), Iranian composer of Persian classical music
- Mojtaba Moharrami (born 1965), former Iranian football player
- Mojtaba Ramezani (born 1989), Iranian football midfielder
- Mojtaba Saminejad (born 1980), Iranian blogger and political activist
- Mojtaba Tarshiz (1978–2026), Iranian footballer
- Mojtaba Tehrani (1933–2013), Iranian Shia Cleric
- Mojtaba Zonnour (born 1963), Iranian Shia cleric

== People named Mujtaba ==
=== Given name ===
- Mujtaba Ali (1904–1974), Bengali poet
- Mujtaba Musavi Lari (1925–2013), Iranian Shia Cleric
- Mujtaba Faiz (born 1982), Afghan footballer
- Mujtaba al-Shirazi (born 1943), Iraqi Shia cleric
- Mujtaba Sayed Jaafar (born 1981), Qatari footballer

=== Surname ===
- Asif Mujtaba (born 1967), Pakistani cricketer
- Kazi Mujtaba (born 1908), Pakistani politician
