= Waddah =

Waddah sometimes Wadah (in Arabic وضاح) is a name. It may refer to:

- Waddah al-Yaman, born Abdul Rahman bin Isma’il al-Khawlani (died 708), an Arab poet
- Wadah Khanfar (born 1969), President of Al Sharq Forum, formerly Director General of Al Jazeera Media Network

== See also ==
- Nu'aym ibn al-Waddah al-Azdi, ninth century military commander and governor of the Yemen for the Abbasid Caliphate
