= Umm Salama bint Ya'qub al-Makhzumi =

Arab princess and Wife of Abbasid caliph al-Saffah

Umm Salama bint Ya'qub أم سلمة بنت يعقوب المخزومي

Consort of the Abbasid caliph
- Tenure: 750 – 754
- Born: c. 718/720; Medina, Umayyad Caliphate
- Died: Kufa, Anbar or Damascus, Abbasid Caliphate
- Spouse: Maslama (Until his death in 740s); Al-Saffah (740s –754)
- Children: Muhammad ibn Abd Allah al-Saffah; Rayta bint Abd Allah al-Saffah; See more
Names
- Umm Salama bint Ya'qub ibn Salama ibn Abd Allah ibn al-Walid al-Makhzumi
- House: Banu Makhzum (by birth); Umayyad and Abbasid (by marriage)
- Father: Ya'qub ibn Salama
- Religion: Islam

Umm Salama bint Yaʿqūb al-Makhzūmī (Arabic: أم سلمة بنت يعقوب المخزومي) was the principal wife of first Abbasid caliph al-Saffah, the founder of Abbasid dynasty. Umm Salama was the only woman in the Caliphate's history who had relation through marriage with both Caliphal dynasties; Umayyads and Abbasids.

== Ancestry ==
Umm Salama bint Ya'qub ibn Salama ibn Abd Allah ibn al-Walid, was a member of the aristocratic Banu Makhzum clan of the Quraysh tribe and a fourth-generation descendant of al-Walid ibn al-Walid (the brother of Khalid ibn al-Walid). Her father was Ya'qub ibn Salama, the brother of Ayyub ibn Salama. Her father and uncle were prominent members of the Makhzum.

== Biography ==
Umm Salama spent her early life in Mecca and Medina. She married the Umayyad prince Abd al-Aziz, a son of Caliph al-Walid I (r. 705–715), but he died in 728 or 729. She afterward married the Umayyad prince Maslama, a son of Caliph Hisham (r. 724–743), and he died in the 740s. She had her son Sa'id from Maslama. Sa'id became an oral transmitter of historical tradition in the early Abbasid period.

After Maslama's death, Umm Salama married the first Abbasid caliph al-Saffah (r. 750–754). Al-Saffah married her before becoming the caliph. He admired her considerably and did not have other wives as was the usual case among the caliphs. He consulted with her until he assumed the caliphate. With al-Saffah, she had a son, Muhammad, and a daughter, Rayta. In 761, Caliph al-Mahdi married Rayta as his first wife after his return from Khurasan. Thus, she was also the mother-in-law of al-Mahdi.

== Family ==
Ya'qub ibn Salama's daughter Umm Salama, he had familial ties with Caliph Hisham's son Maslama and the first Abbasid caliph, al-Saffah, both of whom were married at one point to Umm Salama and had children from her. Their daughter Rayta married the third Abbasid caliph al-Mahdi and gave birth to his sons Ubaydallah and Ali.

No.	Family member	Relation
1	Ya'qub ibn Salama	Father
2	Ayyub ibn Salama	Uncle
3	Sa'id ibn Maslama	Son from Maslama
4	Muhammad ibn Abdallah al-Saffah	Son
5	Rayta bint Abdallah al-Saffah	Daughter
6	Al-Mahdi	Son-in-law
7	Ubaydallah ibn al-Mahdi	Grandson
8	Ali ibn al-Mahdi	Grandson
9	Al-Abbas ibn Abdallah al-Saffah	Son or Step-son

== See also ==
- Arwa bint Mansur al-Himyari

== Sources ==
- Elad, Amikam (2016). The Rebellion of Muḥammad al-Nafs al-Zakiyya in 145/762: Ṭālibīs and Early ʿAbbāsīs in Conflict. Leiden: Brill. ISBN 978-90-04-22989-1.
- Hinds, M. (1991). "Makhzum". In Bosworth, C. E.; van Donzel, E. & Pellat, Ch. (eds.). The Encyclopaedia of Islam, Second Edition. Volume VI: Mahk–Mid. Leiden: E. J. Brill. pp. 137–140. ISBN 978-90-04-08112-3.
- Abbott, Nabia (1946). Two Queens of Baghdad: Mother and Wife of Hārūn Al Rashīd. University of Chicago Press. ISBN 978-0-86356-031-6.
- Bosworth, C. Edmund (1994). "Abū Ḥafṣ 'Umar al-Kirmānī and the Rise of the Barmakids". Bulletin of the School of Oriental and African Studies. 57 (2): 268–282. doi:10.1017/S0041977X0002485X. JSTOR 620573. S2CID 162613546.
