= Murtuza =

Murtuza is an Azerbaijani given name, originating from the Arabic name Murtaza.

Notable people with the name include:

- Bulbul (Murtuza Mammadov) (1897–1961), Azerbaijani vocalist and performer of opera and folk music
- Murtuza Mukhtarov (1865–1920), Azerbaijani oil industrialist
- Golam Murtuza (1995-), Indian Educationist and Researher
