= Abdallah ibn Ubaydallah ibn al-Abbas =

Governor of Yemen and Amir al-hajj

Abbasid Governor of Yemen
- In office 832–833
- Monarch: al-Ma'mun
- Preceded by: Ishaq ibn al-Abbas ibn Muhammad al-Hashimi
- Succeeded by: Abbad ibn al-Ghamr al-Shihabi

Amir al-hajj
- In office 828 (first term)
- In office 829 (second term)
- In office 830 (third term)
- In office 831 (fourth term)
- In office 832 (fifth term)
- Monarch: al-Ma'mun

Personal details
- Parent: Ubaydallah ibn al-Abbas

Abdallah ibn Ubaydallah ibn al-Abbas al-Hashimi (Arabic: عبد الله بن عبيد الله بن العباسي الهاشمي) was a ninth century Abbasid personage and governor of the Yemen.

== Career ==
A minor member of the Abbasid dynasty, being a second cousin of the caliphs al-Hadi (r. 785–786) and Harun al-Rashid (r. 789–809), Abdallah was appointed governor of the Yemen by al-Ma'mun (r. 813–833), and he arrived in Sana'a in ca. 832. He remained governor until the death of al-Ma'mun in 833, at which point he decided to place Abbad ibn al-Ghamr al-Shihabi in charge of the province and departed for Iraq.

Abdallah was also a frequent leader of the pilgrimage, having led the annual events of 828, 829, 831, and possibly 832.

== Notes ==
Political offices
| Preceded by Ishaq ibn al-Abbas ibn Muhammad al-Hashimi | Abbasid governor of the Yemen; 832–833 | Succeeded by Abbad ibn al-Ghamr al-Shihabi |
