= Ubaydallah ibn al-Mahdi =

Abbasid prince and governor (771–810/11)

Ubaydallah ibn al-Mahdi عبيد الله بن محمد المهدي

Governor of Arminiya
- In office: c. 788 – 791
- Predecessor: Yazid ibn Mazyad al-Shaybani
- Successor: Abd al-Qadir (791) then Al-Fadl ibn Yahya

Governor of Egypt
- In office: 795 – 795 (first term)
- Predecessor: Abdallah ibn al-Musayyab
- Successor: Musa ibn Isa
- In office: 796 – 797 (second term)
- Predecessor: Musa ibn Isa
- Successor: Isma'il ibn Salih
- Born: 771; Baghdad, Abbasid Caliphate
- Died: 810/11; Baghdad, Abbasid Caliphate, now Iraq
- Burial: Baghdad
Names
- Ubaydallah ibn Muhammad al-Mahdi ibn Abdallah al-Mansur
- Dynasty: Abbasid
- Father: Al-Mahdi
- Mother: Raytah
- Religion: Islam

Ubaydallah ibn Muhammad al-Mahdi (Arabic: عبيد الله بن محمد المهدي, romanized: ʿUbayd Allāh ibn Muḥammad al-Mahdī) (771–810/11) was an Abbasid prince. He was the son of al-Mahdi, the third caliph of the Abbasid Caliphate, and Raytah, daughter of the first Abbasid caliph Abu al-Abbas al-Saffah.

== Life ==
In 761, the future caliph al-Mahdi married Raytah as his first wife after his return from Khurasan. She was the daughter of al-Saffah and his wife Umm Salamah, a Makhzumite. Raytah gave birth to two sons, Ubaydallah and Ali.

During the reign of his half-brother Harun al-Rashid (r. 786–809), Ubaydallah was appointed as governor of Arminiyah and the northwestern provinces in 788/9, succeeding Yazid ibn Mazyad al-Shaybani. He was later appointed to two brief stints as governor of Egypt, in 795 and 796.

In 810 or 811 Ubaydallah died in Baghdad. His nephew al-Amin led the prayers at his funeral.

== Siblings ==
Ubaydallah was contemporary and related to several Abbasid caliphs, princes and princesses. He had total ten half-siblings and he had one full brother named Ali ibn Muhammad al-Mahdi.

No.	Abbasids	Relation
1	Musa al-Hadi	Half-brother
2	Harun al-Rashid	Half-brother
3	Abbasa bint al-Mahdi	Half-sister
4	Ali ibn al-Mahdi	Brother
5	Mansur ibn al-Mahdi	Half-brother
6	Aliyah bint al-Mahdi	Half-sister
7	Ulayya bint al-Mahdi	Half-sister
8	Abdallah ibn al-Mahdi	Half-brother
9	Ibrahim ibn al-Mahdi	Half-brother
10	Banuqa bint al-Mahdi	Half-sister
11	Isa ibn al-Mahdi	Half-brother

== Notes ==
Preceded by Abd al-Malik ibn Salih	Governor of Egypt; 795	Succeeded by Musa ibn Isa ibn Musa al-Hashimi
Preceded by Musa ibn Isa ibn Musa al-Hashimi	Governor of Egypt; 796–797	Succeeded by Isma'il ibn Salih ibn Ali al-Hashimi
