= Ja'far ibn Sulayman ibn Ali =

Abbasid governor of Medina and Mecca

Ja'far ibn Sulayman ibn Ali جعفر بن سليمان بن علي

Abbasid Governor of Medina
- In office 763–766/77
- Monarch: al-Mansur
- Preceded by: Abdallah ibn al-Rabi al-Harithi
- Succeeded by: Hasan ibn Zayd ibn Hasan
- In office 780–783
- Monarch: al-Mahdi
- Preceded by: Zufar ibn Asim al-Hilali
- Succeeded by: Ibrahim ibn Yahya

Personal details
- Children: Abd al-Rahim; Abd al-Wahid
- Parent: Sulayman ibn Ali al-Hashimi (father)
- Relatives: al-Saffah (cousin) al-Mansur (cousin); Ja'far ibn Abd al-Wahid ibn Ja'far (grandson)

Ja'far ibn Sulayman ibn Ali al-Hashimi (Arabic: جعفر بن سليمان بن علي الهاشمي) was an early Abbasid prince. He served as provisional governor for Abbasid Caliphate.

== Career ==
He was the son of Sulayman ibn Ali. Ja'far was a paternal cousin of the first two Abbasid caliphs al-Saffah (r. 750–754) and al-Mansur (r. 754–775).

His father, Sulayman died in Basra in October 759 at the age of 59, and was succeeded by several sons, including Muhammad and Ja'far.

His first cousin al-Mansur, appointed him governor of Medina in 763 and he was dismissed in 766/77. He was re-appointed in 780 by al-Mahdi and he was dismissed in 783.

== Sources ==
- Bosworth, C.E. (1997). "Sulayman ibn 'Ali ibn 'Abd Allah". In Bosworth, C. E.; van Donzel, E.; Heinrichs, W. P. & Lecomte, G. (eds.). The Encyclopaedia of Islam, Second Edition. Volume IX: San–Sze. Leiden: E. J. Brill. p. 381. doi:10.1163/1573-3912_islam_SIM_7157. ISBN 978-90-04-10422-8.
- Yarshater, Ehsan, ed. (1985–2007). The History of al-Ṭabarī (40 vols). SUNY Series in Near Eastern Studies. Albany, New York: State University of New York Press. ISBN 978-0-7914-7249-1.
- Khalifah ibn Khayyat (1985). al-Umari, Akram Diya' (ed.). Tarikh Khalifah ibn Khayyat (in Arabic) (3rd ed.). Al-Riyadh: Dar Taybah.
- Al-Baladhuri, Ahmad ibn Jabir (1916). The Origins of the Islamic State, Part I. Trans. Philip Khuri Hitti. New York: Columbia University.
