= Ishaq ibn al-Abbas ibn Muhammad al-Hashimi =

Abbasid Governor of Yemen

Ishaq ibn al-Abbas ibn Muhammad al-Hashimi إسحاق بن العباس بن محمد الهاشمي

Abbasid Governor of Yemen
- In office 824 – 827 (first term)
- Monarch: al-Ma'mun
- Preceded by: Muhammad ibn Abdallah ibn Muhriz
- Succeeded by: Muhammad ibn Nafi

Abbasid Governor of Yemen
- In office 830 – c. 832 (second term)
- Monarch: Al-Ma'mun
- Preceded by: Abu al-Razi Muhammad ibn Abd al-Hamid
- Succeeded by: Abdallah ibn Ubaydallah ibn al-Abbas

Personal details
- Relations: Abbasid dynasty
- Parent: Al-Abbas ibn Muhammad al-Hashimi

Ishaq ibn al-Abbas ibn Muhammad al-Hashimi (Arabic: إسحاق بن العباس بن محمد الهاشمي) was a ninth century Abbasid personage, provincial governor and military commander. He was twice appointed as governor of the Yemen, in 824 and 830.

== Career ==
Ishaq was a minor member of the Abbasid dynasty, being a nephew of the caliphs al-Saffah (r. 750–754) and al-Mansur (r. 754–775). He is mentioned as being in Iraq in 817, when he played a small role in supporting the anti-caliph Ibrahim ibn al-Mahdi.

In 824 Ishaq was appointed governor of the Yemen for the caliph al-Ma'mun (r. 813–833), and he arrived in Sana'a at the end of that year. His governorship of the province proved to be extremely tumultuous, and he was soon accused of treating the Yemenis in a harsh manner. Affairs in the province eventually became so disorderly that al-Ma'mun decided to dismiss Ishaq, and Muhammad ibn Nafi' was appointed as governor in his place.

In 830, Ishaq was selected to lead the pilgrimage, and around the same time, he was re-invested with the governorship of the Yemen in order to fill the political vacuum that had prevailed in the region following the killing of Abu al-Razi Muhammad ibn 'Abd al-Hamid. Ishaq accordingly made his way to the province and established himself in Sana'a, but took no action against Abu al-Razi's killer, the rebel Ibrahim ibn Abi Ja'far al-Manakhi, who was allowed to maintain his position in the southern highlands. Ishaq's second governorship continued until he either died or was dismissed, and he was succeeded by Abdallah ibn Ubaydallah ibn al-Abbas.

== Notes ==
Political offices
Preceded by Muhammad ibn Abdallah ibn Muhriz	Abbasid governor of the Yemen; 824–827	Succeeded by Muhammad ibn Nafi'
Preceded by Abu al-Razi Muhammad ibn Abd al-Hamid	Abbasid governor of the Yemen; 830–c. 832	Succeeded by Abdallah ibn Ubaydallah ibn al-Abbas
