= Muhammad ibn Abdallah ibn Muhriz =

Abbasid governor of Yemen (823–824)

Abbasid Governor of Yemen
- In office 823–824
- Monarch: al-Ma'mun
- Preceded by: Nu'aym and Al-Muzaffar ibn Yahya al-Kindi
- Succeeded by: Ishaq ibn al-Abbas ibn Muhammad al-Hashimi

Muhammad ibn Abdallah ibn Muhriz (Arabic: محمد بن عبد الله بن محرز) was a ninth-century governor of the Yemen for the Abbasid Caliphate.

A mawla of the caliph al-Ma'mun (r. 813–833), Muhammad was appointed governor in ca. 823. Upon his arrival in the province he remained in the chief town of Sana'a, while sending his son to act as his deputy in al-Janad. Shortly afterwards, however, the inhabitants of al-Janad revolted against his son, and Muhammad decided that his position was too weak to maintain. He therefore set out for the Hijaz and left the Yemen in the hands of the local chief Abbad ibn al-Ghamr al-Shihabi, who remained in control until the arrival of the next governor Ishaq ibn al-Abbas ibn Muhammad al-Hashimi.

Political offices
Preceded by Nu'aym ibn al-Waddah al-Azdi	Abbasid governor of the Yemen; 823–824	Succeeded by Ishaq ibn al-Abbas ibn Muhammad al-Hashimi
