= Abu al-Razi Muhammad ibn Abd al-Hamid =

Provincial Abbasid governor

Abbasid Governor of Yemen
- In office 828–829
- Monarch: al-Ma'mun
- Preceded by: Muhammad ibn Nafi
- Succeeded by: Ishaq ibn al-Abbas ibn Muhammad al-Hashimi

Abbasid deputy governor of Basra
- In office 819–: 828; (for Salih ibn al-Rashid)
- Monarch: al-Ma'mun

Personal details
- Parent: Abd al-Hamid

Abu al-Razi Muhammad ibn Abd al-Hamid (Arabic: أبو الرازي محمد بن عبد الحميد; died 829) was a ninth-century governor of the Yemen for the Abbasid Caliphate.

== Career ==
A mawla of the caliph al-Ma'mun (r. 813–833), Abu al-Razi was made deputy governor of Basra on behalf of Salih ibn al-Rashid in ca. 819, following the return of the caliph from Khurasan to Baghdad. In ca. 828 he was appointed by al-Ma'mun as governor of the Yemen, and he led an army to the province to deal with the rebel Ahmar al-'Ayn. Upon his arrival in Sana'a he received a request from the rebel for amnesty, which was initially granted, but he subsequently decided to arrest Ahmar al-'Ayn and send him in irons to the caliph in Baghdad.

Shortly after dealing with Ahmar al-'Ayn, Abu al-Razi was faced with another rebellion in the southern highlands of the country, by the Himyarite Ibrahim ibn Abi Ja'far al-Manakhi. The governor decided to advance against Ibrahim and attack him, but in the resulting engagement he was defeated and killed. Following Abu al-Razi's death, Ibrahim proceeded to plunder al-Janad, while Ishaq ibn al-Abbas ibn Muhammad al-Hashimi was selected as the new governor.

Political offices
Preceded by Muhammad ibn Nafi'	Abbasid governor of the Yemen; 828–829	Succeeded by Ishaq ibn al-Abbas ibn Muhammad al-Hashimi
