= Muhammad ibn Nafi =

Abbasid governor of Yemen (827-828)

Muhammad ibn Nafi محمد بن نافع

Abbasid Governor of Yemen
- In office 827–828
- Monarch: al-Ma'mun
- Preceded by: Ishaq ibn al-Abbas ibn Muhammad al-Hashimi
- Succeeded by: Abu al-Razi Muhammad ibn Abd al-Hamid

Personal details
- Born: Abbasid Caliphate
- Parent: Nafi

Muhammad ibn Nafi (Arabic: محمد بن نافع) was a ninth-century governor of the Yemen for the Abbasid Caliphate.

Muhammad was appointed to Sana'a by the caliph al-Ma'mun (r. 813–833) in an attempt to conciliate the Yemenis, who had become disorderly under the previous governor Ishaq ibn al-Abbas ibn Muhammad al-Hashimi. Despite this, he was soon faced with the rebellion of one Ahmad ibn Muhammad al-Umari, nicknamed Ahmar al-Ayn (the Red-Eyed One), in the central highlands, and he was eventually driven out of the province by the rebel. During his governorship, al-Jawf was separately administered by the Hamdani chief Malik ibn Luqman al-Arhabi.

== Notes ==
Political offices
Preceded by Ishaq ibn al-Abbas ibn Muhammad al-Hashimi	Abbasid governor of the Yemen; 827–828	Succeeded by Abu al-Razi Muhammad ibn Abd al-Hamid
