= Morteza Zarringol =

Iranian politician

Morteza Zarringol is an Iranian Kurdish politician.

Morteza Zarringol was mayor of Sanandaj and also member of the Parliament of Iran. He was the head of the Oil Commission in the parliament.
