= Nu'aym ibn al-Waddah al-Azdi =

Abbasid governor of Yemen

Nu'aym ibn al-Waddah al-Azdi نعيم بن الوضاح الأزدي

Abbasid Governor of Yemen
- In office 821–823
- Monarch: al-Ma'mun
- Deputy: Al-Muzaffar ibn Yahya al-Kindi
- Preceded by: Ibrahim al-Ifriqi
- Succeeded by: Muhammad ibn Abdallah ibn Muhriz

Personal details
- Born: Abbasid Caliphate
- Parent: al-Waddah al-Azdi (father)

Military service
- Allegiance: Abbasid Caliphate
- Rank: Commander

Nu'aym ibn al-Waddah al-Azdi (Arabic: نعيم بن الوضاح الأزدي) was a ninth century military commander and governor of the Yemen for the Abbasid Caliphate.

Nu'aym is mentioned as one of Tahir ibn al-Husayn's commanders during the Siege of Baghdad (812–813), when he was sent by Tahir to garrison a southern suburb of the city. Subsequently he was appointed as governor, along with al-Muzaffar ibn Yahya al-Kindi, of the Yemen in 821, and during their co-governorship the two shared joint administration of the country, with Nu'aym exercising authority in Sana'a and al-Muzaffar in al-Janad. They remained in control over the Yemen until al-Muzaffar died, after which Nu'aym was replaced with Muhammad ibn 'Abdallah ibn Muhriz.

Political offices
Preceded by Ibrahim al-Ifriqi	Abbasid governor of the Yemen; 821–823; With: al-Muzaffar ibn Yahya al-Kindi	Succeeded by Muhammad ibn Abdallah ibn Muhriz
