= Ishtar Lakhani =

South African activist

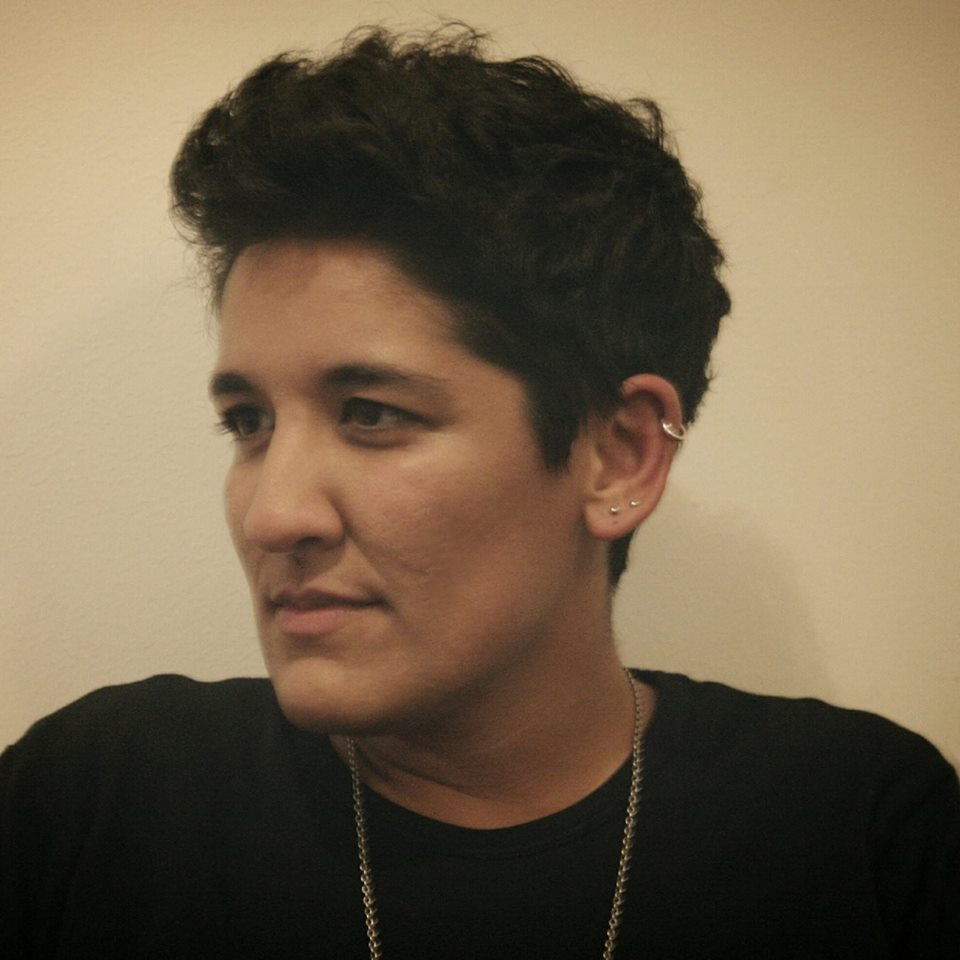
- Born: 1985 (age 40–41)
- Citizenship: South Africa
- Education: Ishtar Lakhani
- Occupation: Activist
- Awards: BBC's 100 Women, Top 200 Young South Africans

Ishtar Lakhani (born 1985) is a feminist activist from South Africa, whose work focuses on issues of social justice, in particular the rights of sex workers. In 2020 she was added by the BBC on their 100 Women list.

== Biography ==
Lakhani was born in 1985. She attended the University of the Witwatersrand and earned an MA in Anthropology from there.

== Career ==
Lakhani's career has ranged from coordinating a radical feminist advocacy network for survivors of sexual violence – the One in Nine Campaign – to revolutionary sandwich making at Love and Revolution, the activist bookshop, coffee shop and community space that she founded in Johannesburg, South Africa.

From 2014 to 2019 she was the human rights manager of the Sex Education and Advocacy Working Group (SWEAT), an organization based in South Africa. She also works alongside social justice organisations strengthening their approaches to human rights advocacy. Creativity is key to her brand of activism. She has worked with organisations around the world to develop creative advocacy campaigns for the rights of sex workers in South Africa, the rights to bodily autonomy and integrity in Southern Africa, countering Islamophobia in Sri Lanka and rising authoritarianism in multiple countries.

During 2020, Lakhani worked on the Free the Vaccine campaign, which was co-ordinated by the Centre for Artistic Activism and Universities Allied for Essential Medicines (UAEM). This campaign aims to ensure that a COVID19 vaccine is reasonably priced, available to all and free at the point of delivery.

== Awards ==
Lakhani was on the list of the BBC's 100 most influential women of 2019, an award listing which is published annually.

Lakhani was on the list of the Mail and Guardian Top 200 Young South Africans.
