= Kazi Mujtaba =

Kazi Mujtaba (born 1908) was a Pakistani politician. He hailed from Meerut, United Provinces of Agra and Oudh.

Kazi worked as a primary school teacher in Karachi. He was a key figure in the founding of the Sind Communist Party in 1942. As a trade union leader he challenged the influence on Narain Bechar Das in the Karachi labour movement. Das had veered towards M.N. Roy's Indian Federation of Labour, and in response the Communist Party of India managed to get Kazi elected as new leader of the Sind Provincial Trade Union Congress.

Kazi later joined the All India Muslim League, but remained involved in labour politics. He was elected to the Sind Legislative Assembly in 1947. After the independence of Pakistan, Kazi became the Parliamentary Secretary of the Pakistan Muslim League in the Constituent Assembly.
