= Murtaza Lakhani =

Pakistani-Canadian businessman

Murtaza Ali Lakhani (born 8 March 1962) is a Pakistani-Canadian oil trader and businessman who is known for his role in managing oil exports for the Kurdistan Regional Government (KRG) and his close associations with major commodity trading houses, such as Glencore and Vitol. He is currently subject to sanctions by the European Union and the United Kingdom.

Lakhani is the founder of Mercantile & Maritime Group.

== Early life ==
Born in Karachi, Pakistan, Lakhani was raised in England and Canada. He initially worked in his family's commodities business, trading rice, cotton, and wheat. In the 1980s, he shifted to oil trading, focusing on jurisdictions regarded as commercially and politically difficult.

== Career ==
=== Iraq and the Oil-for-Food Programme ===
During the regime of Saddam Hussein, Lakhani acted as an agent for the commodities giant Glencore in Baghdad. Initially receiving a monthly stipend to facilitate crude purchases, his involvement deepened under the United Nations’ Oil-for-Food Programme.

In the early 2000s, the Iraqi government demanded illicit surcharges outside the UN monitoring system. Investigations later revealed that Lakhani paid over $1 million in such surcharges to secure crude oil for Glencore. The investigation also described instances in which Lakhani received cash from Glencore, transported it across Switzerland, and delivered it to the Iraqi diplomatic mission in Geneva. Following the US invasion of Iraq, Lakhani voluntarily cooperated with US investigators regarding these payments and stated that his involvement in the matter ended in 2006.

=== Kurdistan Regional Government (KRG) ===
Lakhani grew in prominence in 2014. Following the expansion of the Islamic State (ISIS) into Iraq, Kurdish forces seized control of the oil-rich city of Kirkuk. With the central government in Baghdad threatening legal action against independent Kurdish oil sales, major trading houses were hesitant to engage directly with the KRG. Lakhani's company, IMMS Ltd., stepped in to facilitate logistics, shipping, and port management. He became a central intermediary, or clearing house, for Kurdish oil wealth. Due to international banking compliance issues, the KRG lost access to its accounts in Germany and Turkey in 2017. Consequently, the KRG utilized Lakhani's corporate accounts at BankMed in Lebanon to process oil revenues.

In 2017, Rosneft, led by Igor Sechin, entered Kurdish oil purchasing arrangements and agreed to larger deals that were presented publicly as significant for the region's energy strategy. Around the same period, the KRG faced banking difficulties: one route for receiving revenues was reported to have become impractical amid concerns about Iraq's financial sector, and another was affected by U.S. scrutiny of Turkey's Halkbank, with reported freezes on Kurdish funds.

According to the material summarized in later legal filings, the KRG and Lakhani's company used an account at BankMed in Lebanon, including a sub-account arrangement, as a temporary channel for oil revenues and related payments. A disclosed SWIFT message referenced an $800 million payment dated 13 December 2017 from Rosneft Trading's account at Gazprombank in Zürich, routed via Citibank in New York, to an account linked to Lakhani's company at BankMed. The payment was described as an advance under a crude purchase contract reference and was stated to be sanctions-compliant. Two days later, $725 million was reported to have been placed into short-term deposit accounts at the same bank.

Lakhani's spokesman stated that the $800 million receipt and the $725 million deposits were unrelated and rejected suggestions of a conflict of interest. Rosneft described the payments as transparent and approved through relevant Kurdish authorities. Gazprombank confirmed the transaction and said it adhered to legal requirements in its jurisdictions.

Between late 2017 and the end of 2019, IMMS was reported to have carried out more than $6 billion in transactions through BankMed, including via correspondent relationships involving major international banks. A ledger described as covering March to May 2019 recorded approximately $2.8 billion in inflows, with named counterparties including Vitol (via a subsidiary), Trafigura, and other trading entities, alongside Rosneft-linked payments. Outflows included transfers to oil producers operating in the region and direct transfers to the Kurdish finance ministry, with one three-month total described as about $765 million.

=== The BankMed dispute ===
In 2019, IMMS reportedly placed $1 billion into a three-year term deposit at BankMed at a stated interest rate of 10% per annum. After Lebanon's banking crisis intensified, IMMS sought to withdraw the deposit, but BankMed blocked the withdrawal. Lakhani's company initiated legal proceedings, and the bank subsequently ended its business relationship with him, canceling multiple accounts.

The dispute was later settled out of court, with the parties stating they had resolved their differences and dismissed proceedings. The settlement, as described, did not involve moving deposits out of Lebanon before maturity. Kurdish authorities stated that funds remained stuck in the BankMed sub-account, and they later reported shifting most oil-revenue processing to an account at Citibank while still relying on IMMS for certain transfers.

=== Venezuela ===
Lakhani's firms were also linked to Venezuelan crude shipments in 2019–2020, including ship-to-ship transfers off West Africa that obscured the origin of cargoes during transit. After U.S. sanctions were imposed on Rosneft Trading SA, one of his companies, Mercantile & Maritime announced it would wind down its Venezuelan operations.
