= Rāwī =

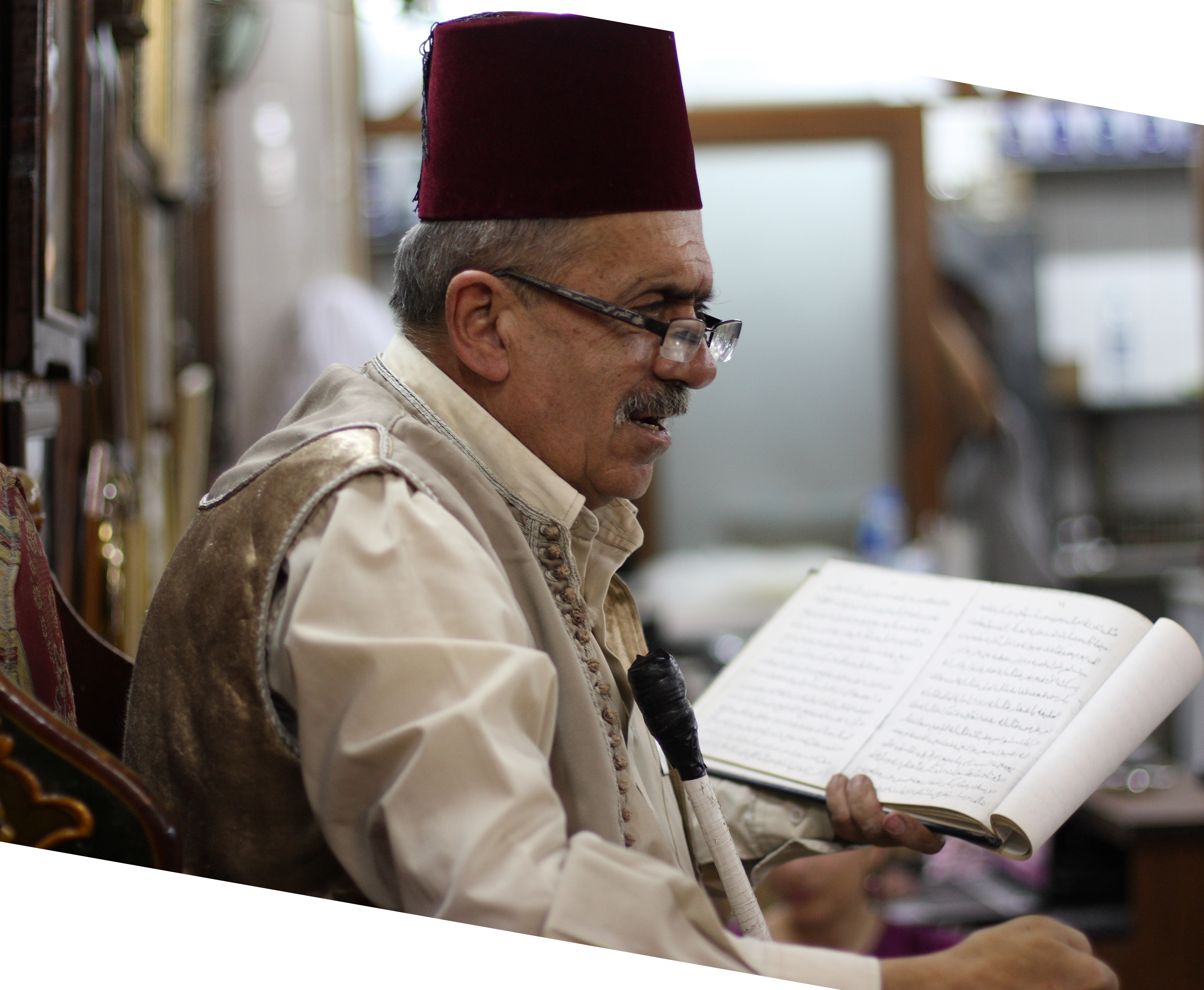
hakawati

A rāwī was a reciter and transmitter of Arabic poetry in the pre-Islamic and early Islamic period (mid-seventh–early eighth centuries). The term was also applied to transmitters of akhbar (narrative traditions) and hadiths (sayings and traditions attributed to the Islamic prophet Muhammad and his companions).

== Meaning ==
Rawi is an Arabic term, meaning "to bear by memory, to transmit or recite." It is a derivative of rawa, an Arabic term, meaning "to carry or convey water." The term riwaya or kathir al-riwaya, meaning "copious transmitter," was the intensive form of the word and was used synonymously with rawi by the early Muslim literary sources.

== Institution ==
A rawi may have been a profession or semi-profession, though it was often occupied by a relative of a poet. The rawi's role was to memorize a poet's verses and publicly recite them, particularly during the annual fairs in Arabia, and pass them down to the next generation. The institution served as the principal tool for the preservation of pre-Islamic poetry. It is likely that the transmissions in the sixth century, especially among Bedouin poets, were oral, though the rawis, and poets operating in the courts of the Lakhmids of al-Hira and of the Ghassanids of Syria may have written down their poetry.

During the early Umayyad period (661–750), the first volumes of poetry, the Mu'allaqat ("the Hanging Poems"), were recorded in written form. The prominent poets al-Farazdaq and Jarir were known to have dictated their verses to rawis, suggesting that writing initially assisted oral transmission until eventually replacing it. In the early Abbasid period (750–1258) Bedouin poetry was systematically compiled by sophisticated rawis, who recorded the poetry they possessed and memorized them for recitation as well. They gathered their poems from Bedouin and questioned them to verify their authenticity. The Bedouin transmitters were also called rawis. The historian Renate Jacobi notes of the early Islamic-era transmissions, "presumably the term rawi/riwaya was applied, as long as learning by heart and reciting of verses still played a part, even if a marginal one, in poetic transmission."

== Bibliography ==
- Jacobi, Renate (1995). "Rāwī". In Bosworth, C. E.; van Donzel, E.; Heinrichs, W. P. & Lecomte, G. (eds.). The Encyclopaedia of Islam, Second Edition. Volume VIII: Ned–Sam. Leiden: E. J. Brill. pp. 466–467. ISBN 978-90-04-09834-3.
