= Al-Husayn ibn Ali al-Abid =

Descendant of Hasan ibn Ali

Al-Ḥusayn ibn ʿAlī al-ʿĀbid (Ṣāḥib Fakhkh) 12th Imam of the Zaydi Shi'ism

12th Zaydi Imam
- Preceded by: Al-Hasan ibn Ibrahim ibn ʿAbd Allāh al-Kāmīl
- Succeeded by: ʿĪsā Mū'tam (Father of Aḥmad) al-Ashbāl ibn Zayd ibn ʿAlī Zayn al-ʿĀbidīn

Personal life
- Born: Al-Ḥusayn c. 745 Medina, Hejaz, Arabia
- Died: c. 11June 786 Mecca
- Spouse
- Children
- Parent: ʿAlī al-ʿĀbid (father)

Religious life
- Religion: Islam

Al-Ḥusayn ibn ʿAlī al-ʿĀbid ibn Hasan al-Mu'thallath ibn Hasan al-Mu'thannā ibn Hasan ibn Ali (Arabic: الحسين بن علي العابد) was an Alid who rebelled at Medina against the Abbasid caliph al-Hadi. His grandfather Hasan al-Mu'thallath is the grandson of Hasan ibn Ali. He was killed with many of his followers at the Battle of Fakhkh outside Mecca on 11 June 786, whence he is known to history as the Man of Fakhkh (Arabic: صاحب فخ, romanized: Ṣāḥib Fakhkh).

== Family and early life ==
Husayn's father was Ali al-Abid, a great-grandson of al-Hasan ibn Ali, and his mother was Zaynab, the daughter of Abdallah ibn al-Hasan al-Muthanna, a grandson of al-Hasan ibn Ali. Both of his parents were renowned for their piety, to the point that his father volunteered to join his Alid relatives who were imprisoned by the Abbasid caliph al-Mansur in 758 and 762, dying in prison in 763. Muhammad al-Nafs al-Zakiyya, who led a major Alid revolt in Medina against the Abbasids in 762, was a brother of Husayn's mother.

Husayn thus grew up in what the historian Laura Veccia Vaglieri describes as "an atmosphere of extreme piety and of secret hatred for the Abbasids". Nevertheless, Husayn had friendly relations with the third Abbasid caliph, al-Mahdi (r. 775–785), who gave him money and released an Alid prisoner at Husayn's intercession. According to Veccia Vaglieri, "[t]here exist many anecdotes about his love for the poor, his charity, his inability to understand the value of money and his boundless generosity".

== Revolt ==
Shortly after Caliph al-Mahdi died in July 785, Husayn and his followers rose in revolt at Medina, hoping to take advantage of the as yet unstable position of al-Mahdi's successor, al-Hadi. Probably on 16 May 786, Husayn and his fellow conspirators tried to seize control of Medina. At the Mosque of the Prophet, Husayn took the pulpit, symbolically dressed in white and wearing a white turban, and received the allegiance of his followers, with the regnal name of al-Murtaḍā min Āl Muḥammad, 'the One pleasing to God from the house of Muhammad'.

The rebels failed to rally the ordinary people to their cause, however, and were quickly confronted by the local garrison. Over the following days, the partisans of the Alids (al-Mubayyiḍa, the 'wearers of white') and the Abbasids (al-Musawwida, the 'wearers of black') clashed repeatedly, but the latter emerged victorious, confining the Alids and their partisans to the precinct of the Great Mosque. With his uprising clearly a failure, Husayn left the city for Mecca on 28 May, with some 300 followers.

On 11 June 786, at the wadi of Fakhkh, some 4 kilometres (2.5 mi) northwest of Mecca, Husayn's small force encountered the Abbasid army, under the command of a number of Abbasid princes who had been present in the city with their armed retinues for the Hajj. In the ensuing battle, Husayn and over a hundred of his followers were killed, and many taken prisoner. Many Alids managed to escape the battle by mingling with the Hajj pilgrims. Among them were Idris and Yahya, the brothers of Muhammad al-Nafs al-Zakiyya. Idris eventually moved to the Maghreb, and in 789 established the Idrisid dynasty in the area of modern Morocco, while his brother Yahya raised a revolt in Daylam in 792.

== Sources ==
- Bosworth, C. E., ed. (1989). The History of al-Ṭabarī, Volume XXX: The ʿAbbāsid Caliphate in Equilibrium: The Caliphates of Mūsā al-Hādī and Hārūn al-Rashīd, A.D. 785–809/A.H. 169–192. SUNY Series in Near Eastern Studies. Albany, New York: State University of New York Press. ISBN 978-0-88706-564-4.
- Turner, John P. (2016). "Fakhkh". In Fleet, Kate; Krämer, Gudrun; Matringe, Denis; Nawas, John; Rowson, Everett (eds.). Encyclopaedia of Islam (3rd ed.). Brill Online. doi:10.1163/1573-3912_ei3_COM_26920. ISSN 1873-9830.
- Veccia Vaglieri, L. (1971). "al-Ḥusayn b. ʿAlī, Ṣāḥib Fak̲h̲k̲h̲". In Lewis, B.; Ménage, V. L.; Pellat, Ch. & Schacht, J. (eds.). The Encyclopaedia of Islam, Second Edition. Volume III: H–Iram. Leiden: E. J. Brill. pp. 615–617. doi:10.1163/1573-3912_islam_SIM_2979. OCLC 495469525.
