= Al-Saffah =

Abbasid caliph from 750 to 754

al-Saffāḥ السفّاح
- Amir al-Mu'minin; Khalifat Rasul Allah
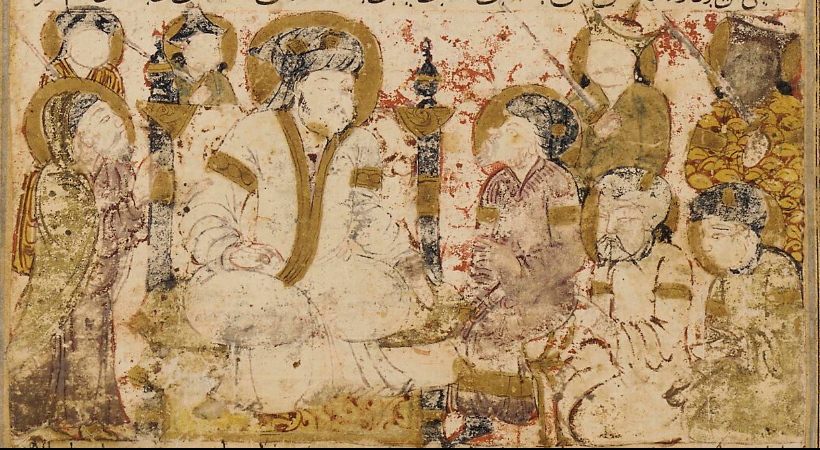
- as-Saffah's proclamation as caliph, from a 14th-century illustrated manuscript of Balami's Tarikhnama

1st Caliph of the Abbasid Caliphate
- Reign: 25 January 750 – 8 June 754
- Predecessor: Dynasty established Marwan II as Umayyad caliph
- Successor: al-Mansur
- Born: c. 721 al-Humayma, Umayyad Caliphate
- Died: 8 June 754 (aged 33) al-Anbar, Abbasid Caliphate
- Burial: al-Anbar, Abbasid Caliphate
- Spouse: Umm Salama bint Ya'qub al-Makhzumi
- Issue: Muhammad; al-Abbas; Rayta
Names
- Kunya: Abu al-Abbas; Given name: Abd Allah; Laqab: al-Saffah; Nasab: Abd Allah ibn Muhammad ibn Ali ibn Abd Allah ibn al-Abbas ibn Abd al-Muttalib ibn Hashim
- Dynasty: Abbasid
- Father: Muhammad ibn Ali ibn Abd Allah
- Mother: Rayta bint Ubayd Allah
- Religion: Sunni Islam

Abu al-ʿAbbās ʿAbd Allāh ibn Muḥammad ibn ʿAlī ibn ʿAbd Allāh ibn al-ʿAbbās (Arabic: أبو العباس عبد الله ابن محمد ابن علي; 721/722 – 8 June 754), known by his laqab al-Saffāḥ (Arabic: السفّاح), was the founder of the Abbasid Caliphate, ruling as the first caliph of the Abbasid dynasty from 750 until his death in 754.

His laqab al-Saffāḥ means "the Blood-Shedder". It may refer to his ruthless tactics, or perhaps it was used to intimidate his enemies. It was during his inaugural homage as Caliph, delivered in the Great Mosque of Kufa, that he called himself "al-Saffah" ("the Blood-Shedder"), and this title stuck to him due to his massacre of the Umayyads.

== Early life and background ==
al-Saffāḥ, born in al-Humayma (modern-day Jordan), was the head of one branch of the Banu Hashim, a sub-clan of the Quraysh tribe who traced its lineage to Hashim, a great-grandfather of Muhammad, via al-Abbas, an uncle of the Prophet, hence the title "Abbasid" for his descendants' caliphate. This indirect link to Muhammad's larger clan formed a sufficient basis for al-Saffah's claim to the position of caliph.

Abu al-Abbas al-Saffah was the son of Muhammad ibn Ali and Rayta, daughter of a certain Ubayd Allah ibn Abd Allah.

=== Background ===
As narrated in many hadith, many believed that in the end times a great leader or mahdi would appear from the family of Muhammad, to which Ali belonged, who would deliver Islam from corrupt leadership. The half-hearted policies of the late Umayyad caliphs to tolerate non-Arab Muslims and Shi'as had failed to quell unrest among these minorities.

During the reign of the Umayyad caliph Hisham ibn Abd al-Malik, this unrest led to a revolt in Kufa in southern Iraq, mainly by the town's slaves. The Shi'as revolted in 736 and held the city until 740, led by Zayd ibn Ali. Zayd's rebellion was put down by the Umayyad armies in 740. The revolt in Kufa indicated the growing unrest in the Muslim world. During the last days of the Umayyad Caliphate, al-Saffah and his clan chose to begin their rebellion in Khorasan, an important, but remote military region.

In 743, the death of Caliph Hisham provoked a rebellion in the east. al-Saffah, supported by the Shi'as and the residents of Khorasan, led his forces to victory over the Umayyads. The civil war was marked by millennial prophecies encouraged by the beliefs of some Shi'as that al-Saffah was the mahdi.

== Family tree ==
The Abbasid Caliphate was established by a dynasty descended from Muhammad's uncle, Abbas ibn Abd al-Muttalib (566–653), from whom the dynasty takes its name.

Hashim ibn Abd Manaf
Abd al-Muttalib
al-Abbas (Muhammad's uncle)
Abdallah ibn Abbas
Ali ibn Abd Allah
Muhammad ibn Ali
Ibrahim	al-Saffah	al-Mansur

== Caliphate ==
In early October 749 (132 AH), al-Saffah's rebel army entered Kufa, a major Muslim center in lower Mesopotamia. Al-Saffah had not been yet declared caliph. One of his priorities was to eliminate his Umayyad rival, Caliph Marwan II. He did so in February 750 at the Battle of the Zab, effectively ending the Umayyad Caliphate, which had ruled since 661. Marwan II fled back to Damascus, which didn't welcome him, and was ultimately killed on the run in Egypt that August. al-Saffah would go on to become the first Abbasid caliph, but he did not come forward to receive the pledge of allegiance from the people until after the Umayyad caliph and a large number of his princes were already killed. al-Saffah established Kufa as the new capital of the Caliphate, ending the dominance of Damascus in the Islamic political world, and Iraq would now become the seat of the Abbasid dynasty for many centuries.

In 750, al-Saffah appointed Dawud ibn Ali al-Hashimi as governor of Mecca and Medina. During Dawud's brief tenure, He acted decisively against Umayyad partisans and political opponents in Hejaz, ordering the execution of figures such as Abd Allah ibn Anbasa ibn Sa'id and Ismail ibn Umayya ibn Amr. Others, such as Ayyub ibn Musa ibn Amr ibn Sa'id, were also imprisoned and died while in his custody. Dawud died in office later in 750 and Al-Saffah then appointed his own maternal uncle Ziyad ibn Ubayd Allah al-Harithi as the replacement of Dawud. in 750. The caliph appointed Salih ibn Ali as the first Abbasid governor of Egypt on 9 August 750. He kept the post for less than a year, being named governor of Jund Filastin (Palestine) in March 751. In this capacity, he sent Sa'id ibn Abdallah in the first ghazwa (raid) of the Abbasid era in al-Awasim, the contested border region with the Byzantine Empire. On 8 October, 753 he was appointed again as governor of Egypt, a post he held until 21 February 755.

In 750 al-Saffah, appointed Sulayman ibn Ali al-Hashimi as governor of the important post of Basra in southern Iraq, together with its dependencies, as well as a number of other provinces including the Tigris districts, Bahrayn, Oman and Mihrajanqadhaq. In 753 the caliph also selected him Amir al-Hajj, the chief of the Hajj, for that year.

During Sulayman ibn Ali's administration in Basra, Sulayman carried out extensive public works projects to develop the region, including building new canals and making improvements the local water supply. He also assisted Khazim ibn Khuzayma al-Tamimi during the latter's campaign against Kharijite rebels in Oman in 750–1 by providing him with ships to transport Abbasid army.

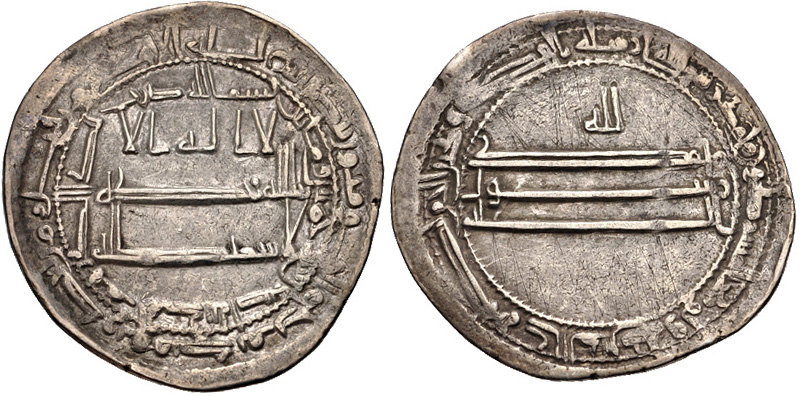
Dirham of as-Saffah, Kufa minted, Dated (133 AH) 751 CE

Later tales recount that, concerned that there would be a resurgence of Umayyad power, al-Saffah invited all of the remaining members of the Umayyad family to a dinner party, where he had them clubbed to death before the first course, which was then served to the hosts. The only survivor, Abd al-Rahman ibn Mu'awiya, escaped to the province of al-Andalus, where the Umayyad dynasty would endure for three more centuries in the form of the Umayyad state of Córdoba. Another version is that al-Saffah's new governor to Syria, Abd Allah ibn Ali, hunted down the last of the Umayyads, with only Abd al-Rahman escaping. Ultimately, Abbasid rule was accepted even in Syria, and the beginning of the new Islamic dynasty was considered "free from major internal dissensions."

Al-Saffah's four-year reign was marked with efforts to consolidate and rebuild the Caliphate. His supporters were represented in the new government, but apart from his policy toward the Umayyads, al-Saffah is widely viewed by historians as having been a mild victor. Jews, Eastern Christians, and Persians were well represented in his government and in succeeding Abbasid administrations. Education was also encouraged, and the first paper mills, staffed by skilled Tang Chinese prisoners captured at the Battle of Talas, were set up in Samarkand.

Equally revolutionary was al-Saffah's reform of the army, which came to include non-Muslims and non-Arabs in sharp contrast to the Umayyads who refused any soldiers of either type. al-Saffah selected the gifted Abu Muslim as his military commander, an officer who would serve until 755 in the Abbasid army.

Al-Saffah notably said "tolerance is laudable, except in matters dangerous to religious belief, or to the sovereign's dignity."

== Military activities ==
During his reign a great battle took place in 751, known as the Battle of Talas. It was a military engagement between the Abbasid Caliphate, along with their ally the Tibetan Empire, against the Chinese Tang dynasty. In July 751 CE, Tang and Abbasid forces met in the valley of the Talas River to vie for control over the Syr Darya region of central Asia. After several days of stalemate, the Karluk Turks, originally allied to the Tang, defected to the Abbasids and tipped the balance of power, resulting in a rout of the Tang forces.

The defeat marked the end of Tang westward expansion and resulted in Muslim control of Transoxiana for the next 400 years. Control of this region was economically beneficial for the Abbasids because it was on the Silk Road. Historians debate whether or not Chinese prisoners captured in the aftermath of the battle brought paper-making technology to the Middle East, where it eventually spread to Europe.

The numbers of combatants involved in the battle of Talas are not known with certainty; however, various estimates exist. The Abbasid army (200,000 Muslim troops according to Chinese estimates, though these numbers may be greatly exaggerated) which included contingents from their Tibetan ally met the combined army of 10,000 Tang Chinese and 20,000 Karluk mercenaries (Arab records put the Chinese forces at 100,000 which also may be greatly exaggerated).

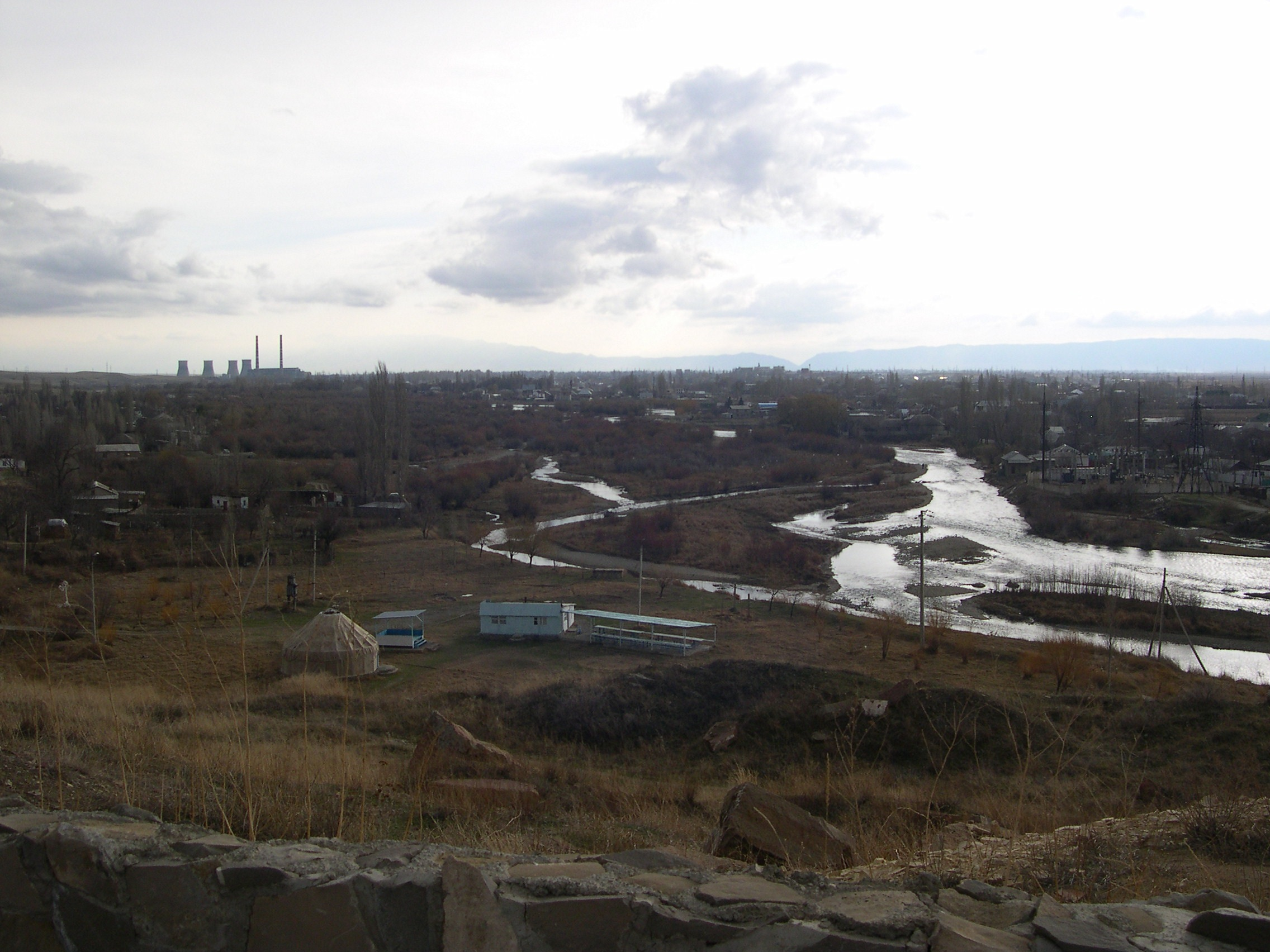
Modern view of Talas River, which starts in the mountains of Kyrgyzstan and winds down into Kazakhstan. On the right side of the river is the city of Taraz.

The Tang army was subjected to a devastating defeat. The Tang dynasty's defeat was due to the defection of Karluk mercenaries and the retreat of Ferghana allies who originally supported the Chinese. The Karluk mercenaries, comprising around two-thirds of the Tang army, defected to the Abbasids during the battle; Karluk troops attacked the Tang army from close quarters while the main Abbasid forces attacked from the front. The Tang troops were unable to hold their positions, and the commander of the Tang forces, Gao Xianzhi, recognized that defeat was imminent and managed to escape with some of his Tang regulars with the help of Li Siye.

Out of an estimated 10,000 Tang troops, only 2,000 managed to return from the Talas to their territory in Central Asia. Despite losing the battle, Li did inflict heavy losses on the pursuing Arab army after being reproached by Duan Xiushi. After the battle, Gao was prepared to organize another Tang army against the Arabs when the devastating An Shi Rebellion broke out in 755. When the Tang capital was taken by rebels, all Chinese armies stationed in Central Asia were ordered back to China proper to crush the rebellion.

Also in 751, the Byzantine Emperor Constantine V led an invasion across the frontier of the Caliphate. The Byzantines captured Theodosiopolis and Melitene, which was demolished. There was no serious attempt to retain control of the captured cities, except for Camachum (modern Kemah, Erzincan), which was garrisoned.

== Succession ==
al-Saffah died after a five-year reign and Abu Ja'far Abd Allah took on the responsibility of establishing the Abbasid Caliphate by holding on to power for nearly 22 years, from Dhu'l-Hijja 136 AH until Dhu'l-Hijja 158 AH (754–775). Abu Ja'far Abd Allah was proclaimed Caliph on his way to Mecca in the year 753 (136 AH) and was inaugurated the following year. He took the name al-Mansur ("the victorious") and agreed to make his nephew Isa ibn Musa his heir to the Abbasid caliphate. This agreement was supposed to resolve rivalries in the Abbasid family, but al-Mansur's right to accession was particularly challenged by his uncle Abd Allah ibn Ali. Once in power, caliph al-Mansur had his uncle imprisoned in 754 and killed in 764.

== Death and legacy ==
Abu al-ʿAbbās Abd Allāh al-Saffāḥ died of smallpox on 8 June 754 (13 Dhu'l-Hijja 136 AH), only four years after taking the throne of Caliphate. Before he died, al-Saffah appointed his brother, Abu Ja'far Abd Allah

Al-Saffah died on his way to Mecca, and on his deathbed he nominated Abu Jafar as his heir. At the time, his uncle, Abd Allah was preparing a major campaign against the Isaurian–Byzantine regime, and had assembled a large army for this purpose. Upon receiving news of al-Saffah's death, Abd Allah proclaimed himself as Caliph, claiming that al-Saffah had promised him the succession as a reward for his role in the overthrow of Marwan II.

Al-Saffah was the first caliph of the Abbasid dynasty. He nominated his brother Abu Ja'far Abd Allah as heir, because his own son was too young to succeeded to the Caliphate. His brother nominated his son (al-Saffah's nephew) as heir. Al-Saffah's nephew nominated his two sons as heir. Even though al-Saffah's son never ascended to Caliphate, his children remained influential. In 761, his nephew Muhammad (future caliph al-Mahdi) married Rayta as his first wife after his return from Khurasan. She gave birth to two sons, Ubayd Allah and Ali. His elder grandson, Ubayd Allah was appointed as governor of Arminiyah and the northwestern provinces in 788/9. He was later appointed to two brief stints as governor of Egypt, in 795 and 796. His second grandson, Ali was the uncle and father-in-law of sixth Abbasid caliph al-Amin through his daughter Lubana.

== See also ==
- al-Mahdi, nephew and son-in-law of al-Saffah.
- Ubaydallah ibn al-Mahdi, Abbasid prince and grandson of al-Saffah.
- Sulayman ibn Ali al-Hashimi, Abbasid governor of Basra from 750 to 755.
- Battle of the Zab, a battle that took place on 25 January 750. It led to the collapse of the Umayyads and the rise of the Abbasids
- Abbasid Revolution, the overthrow of the last Umayyad caliph Marwan II by the Abbasids under al-Saffah.

== Bibliography ==
- Bonner, M.D. (2004) Arab-Byzantine Relations in Early Islamic Times, Ashgate/Variorum, Farnham ISBN 9780860787167
- Hoiberg, Dale H., ed. (2010). ""Abbasid Dynasty"". Encyclopedia Britannica. I: A-Ak – Bayes (15th ed.). Encyclopaedia Britannica, Incorporated. ISBN 978-1-59339-837-8.
- Houtsma, Martijn Theodoor (1993). E.J. Brill's First Encyclopaedia of Islam. Vol. 1. Brill. ISBN 9789004097872.
- Kennedy, Hugh (2004) [1986]. The Prophet and the Age of the Caliphates: The Islamic Near East from the 6th to the 11th Century (Second ed.). Harlow: Longman. ISBN 978-0-582-40525-7.
- Kennedy, Hugh N. (2016). The Early Abbasid Caliphate : A Political History (3rd reprinted & revised ed.). London: Routledge. doi:10.4324/9781315667423. ISBN 978-1-315-66742-3.
- Treadgold, Warren (1997). A History of the Byzantine State and Society. Stanford, California: Stanford University Press. ISBN 0-8047-2630-2.
- Williams, John Alden, ed. (1985). The History of al-Ṭabarī, Volume XXVII: The ʿAbbāsid Revolution, A.D. 743–750/A.H. 126–132. SUNY Series in Near Eastern Studies. Albany, New York: State University of New York Press. ISBN 978-0-87395-884-4.
- The Oxford History of Islam, p. 25. Ed. John Esposito. Oxford: Oxford University Press, 1999.
- Al-Baladhuri, Ahmad ibn Jabir (1916). The Origins of the Islamic State, Part I. Trans. Philip Khuri Hitti. New York: Columbia University.
- Bosworth, C. E., ed. (1989). The History of al-Ṭabarī, Volume XXX: The ʿAbbāsid Caliphate in Equilibrium: The Caliphates of Mūsā al-Hādī and Hārūn al-Rashīd, A.D. 785–809/A.H. 169–192. SUNY Series in Near Eastern Studies. Albany, New York: State University of New York Press. ISBN 978-0-88706-564-4.
- Bates, Michael L. (7 August 2019), Names and Titles on Islamic Coins
- Khalifah ibn Khayyat (1985). al-Umari, Akram Diya' (ed.). Tarikh Khalifah ibn Khayyat, 3rd ed (in Arabic). Al-Riyadh: Dar Taybah.
- Al-Kindi, Muhammad ibn Yusuf (1912). Guest, Rhuvon (ed.). The Governors and Judges of Egypt (in Arabic). Leyden and London: E. J. Brill.
- Ibn Hazm, Abu Muhammad ibn 'Ali ibn Ahmad ibn Sa'id al-Andalusi (1982). Harun, 'Abd al-Salam Muhammad (ed.). Jamharat Ansab al-'Arab (in Arabic) (5th ed.). Cairo: Dar al-Ma'arif.
- Ibn Qutaybah, Abu Muhammad Abdallah ibn Muslim (n.d.). Ukashah, Tharwat (ed.). Al-Ma'arif (4th ed.). Cairo: al-Dar Ma'arif.
- Abbott, Nabia (1946). Two Queens of Baghdad: Mother and Wife of Hārūn Al Rashīd. University of Chicago Press. ISBN 978-0-86356-031-6.
- Al-Khatib al-Baghdadi, Abu Bakr Ahmad ibn Ali (2011). Mustafa 'Abd al-Qadir 'Ata (ed.). Tarikh Baghdad/Madinat al-Salam (in Arabic). Vol. 10. Beirut: Dar al-Kutub al-'Ilmiyya.
- Bedrosian, Robert (2006), Ghewond's History, Translated from Classical Armenian
- Bonner, Michael (January–March 1988). "Al-Khalīfa Al-Marḍī: The Accession of Hārūn Al-Rashīd". Journal of the American Oriental Society. 108 (1): 79–91. doi:10.2307/603247. JSTOR 603247.
- Gordon, Matthew S.; Robinson, Chase F.; Rowson, Everett K.; et al., eds. (2018). The Works of Ibn Wadih al-Ya'qubi: An English Translation. Vol. 3. Leiden and Boston: Brill. ISBN 978-90-04-35621-4.
- Zetterstéen, K.V. (1987). "ʿAbd Allāh b. ʿAlī". In Houtsma, Martijn Theodoor (ed.). E.J. Brill's first encyclopaedia of Islam, 1913–1936, Volume I: A–Bābā Beg. Leiden: BRILL. pp. 22–23. ISBN 90-04-08265-4.
- Cobb, Paul M. (2001). White Banners: Contention in 'Abbāsid Syria, 750–880. Albany, NY: State University of New York Press. ISBN 0-7914-4880-0.
- Ibn Taghribirdi, Jamal al-Din Abu al-Mahasin Yusuf (1930). Nujum al-zahira fi muluk Misr wa'l-Qahira, Volume II (in Arabic). Cairo: Dar al-Kutub al-Misriyya.
- Elad, Amikam (2015). The Rebellion of Muḥammad al-Nafs al-Zakiyya in 145/762: Ṭālibīs and Early ʿAbbāsīs in Conflict. BRILL. ISBN 978-90-04-29622-0.
- Bosworth, C.E. (1997). "Sulayman ibn 'Ali ibn 'Abd Allah". In Bosworth, C. E.; van Donzel, E.; Heinrichs, W. P. & Lecomte, G. (eds.). The Encyclopaedia of Islam, Second Edition. Volume IX: San–Sze. Leiden: E. J. Brill. p. 381. ISBN 978-90-04-10422-8.
- Al-Mas'udi, Ali ibn al-Husain (1861–1917). Les Prairies D'Or (in French). Vol. 9 vols. Ed. and Trans. Charles Barbier de Meynard and Abel Pavet de Courteille. Paris: Imprimerie Nationale.
- Al-Baladhuri, Ahmad ibn Jabir (1924). The Origins of the Islamic State. Vol. 2. Ed. and Trans. Francis Clark Murgotten. New York: Columbia University.
- Yarshater, Ehsan, ed. (1985–2007). The History of al-Ṭabarī (40 vols). SUNY Series in Near Eastern Studies. Albany, New York: State University of New York Press. ISBN 978-0-7914-7249-1.
- Crone, Patricia (1980). Slaves on Horses: The Evolution of the Islamic Polity (1980 ed.). Cambridge: Cambridge University Press. ISBN 978-0521229616.
- Kennedy, Hugh (1981). The Early Abbasid Caliphate, A Political History. Routledge. ISBN 978-0-389-20018-5.

as-Saffah Banu Hashim Clan of the Banu Quraish Born: c. 721 CE Died: c. 8 June 754 CE
Shia Islam titles
Preceded by Ibrahim "al-Imām" ibn Muhammad	Eighth Imam of the Hashimiyya ? – 8 June 754	Succeeded by Abu Ja'far Abdallah
Preceded by Marwan II as caliph of the Umayyad Caliphate	Caliph of the Abbasid Caliphate; 25 January 750 – 8 June 754	Succeeded by al-Mansur
